= 2012 Formula D season =

2012 Formula D

Seasons
- ← 2011 2013 →

The 2012 Formula D season (officially titled Formula Drift Pro Championship) was the ninth season of the Formula D series. The season began on April 6 in Long Beach and ended on October 13 at Toyota Speedway at Irwindale.

== Schedule ==
| Round | Event | Location | Date | Winner | Car |
|---|---|---|---|---|---|
| 1 | (California) Streets of Long Beach | Long Beach, California | April 6–7 | (United States) Justin Pawlak | (United States) Ford Mustang |
| 2 | (Georgia (U.S. state)) Road Atlanta | Braselton, Georgia | May 11–12 | (United States) Justin Pawlak | (United States) Ford Mustang |
| 3 | (Florida) Palm Beach International Raceway | Palm Beach, Florida | June 1–2 | (Japan) Daigo Saito | (Japan) Lexus SC 430 |
| 4 | (New Jersey) Wall Township Speedway | Wall Township, New Jersey | June 22–23 | (United States) Vaughn Gittin, Jr. | (United States) Ford Mustang |
| 5 | (Washington (state)) Evergreen Speedway | Monroe, Washington | July 20–21 | (United States) Vaughn Gittin, Jr. | (United States) Ford Mustang |
| 6 | (Nevada) Las Vegas Motor Speedway | Las Vegas, Nevada | August 24–25 | (New Zealand) Rhys Millen | (South Korea) Hyundai Genesis |
| 7 | (California) Toyota Speedway | Irwindale, California | October 12–13 | (Japan) Daigo Saito | (Japan) Lexus SC 430 |

== Championship standings ==
Event winners in bold.

| Pos | Driver | LBH | ATL | PBR | WTS | EVS | LVS | IRW | Points |
|---|---|---|---|---|---|---|---|---|---|
| 1 | (Japan) Daigo Saito | 78.50 | 79 | **102** | 69.50 | 54.50 | 64 | **101** | 548.50 |
| 2 | (United States) Vaughn Gittin, Jr. | 32 | 64 | 73 | **110** | **112** | 82 | 56 | 529 |
| 3 | (New Zealand) Rhys Millen | 64 | 63 | 58 | 55 | 78.25 | **110** | 81 | 509.25 |
| 4 | (United States) Justin Pawlak | **106** | **103** | 71 | 62 | 34 | 27 | 98 | 501 |
| 5 | (United States) Ryan Tuerck | 66 | 54.50 | 63 | 56 | 89 | 55 | 82 | 465.50 |
| 6 | (Norway) Fredric Aasbø | 56 | 96 | 24.50 | 62 | 57 | 100 | 62 | 457.50 |
| 7 | (Japan) Daijiro Yoshihara | 92 | 26 | 79 | 94 | 56 | 54.50 | 24.50 | 426 |
| 8 | (Japan) Kenshiro Gushi | 62 | 24.25 | 54.25 | 56 | 70 | 55 | 58 | 379.50 |
| 9 | (United States) Conrad Grunewald | 57 | 28 | 24.50 | 64 | 65 | 67 | 54.25 | 359.75 |
| 10 | (United States) Matt Powers | 69.50 | 57 | 24.50 | 61.50 | 63 | 27 | 56 | 358.50 |
| 11 | (United States) Chris Forsberg | 63 | 30 | 90 | 82 | 28 | 24.25 | 30 | 347.25 |
| 12 | (United States) Michael Essa | 24.50 | 73 | 55 | 24.50 | 55 | 65 | 24.50 | 321.50 |
| 13 | (Japan) Robbie Nishida | 24.25 | 24.25 | 54.25 | 55 | 24.50 | 77 | 61.50 | 320.75 |
| 14 | (United States) Tyler McQuarrie | 64 | 24.50 | 32 | 63 | 0 | 61.50 | 64 | 309 |
| 15 | (Japan) Toshiki Yoshioka | 54.25 | 54.25 | 54.25 | 0 | 62 | 54.25 | 24.25 | 303.25 |
| 16 | (Lithuania) Aurimas Bakchis | 54.25 | 63 | 60 | 66 | 24.50 | 24.25 | 0 | 292 |
| 17 | (United States) Chelsea DeNofa | 24.50 | 24.50 | 61.50 | 58 | 24.25 | 56 | 27 | 275.75 |
| 18 | (United States) Walker Wilkerson | 0 | 69.50 | 57 | 0 | 57 | 54.50 | 24.25 | 262.25 |
| 19 | (Norway) Kenneth Moen | 61.50 | 26 | 62 | 57 | 24.50 | 0 | 24.25 | 255.25 |
| 20 | (United States) Matt Field | 24.25 | 55 | 24.25 | 0 | 62 | 24.50 | 63 | 253 |
| 21 | (Japan) Ryan Kado | 56 | 58 | 24.50 | 24.50 | 63 | 0 | 24.25 | 250.25 |
| 22 | (United States) Kyle Mohan | 55 | 54.50 | 24.25 | 24.50 | 0 | 25 | 55 | 238.25 |
| 23 | (United States) Tony Angelo | 24.50 | 54.25 | 25 | 24.25 | 24.25 | 24.25 | 54.50 | 231 |
| 24 | (South Korea) Joon Woo-Maeng | 24.25 | 62 | 24.25 | 24.50 | X | 26 | 24.25 | 185.25 |
| 25 | (Republic of Ireland) Darren McNamara | 26 | 24.25 | 58 | 26 | 26 | X | 24.25 | 184.50 |
| 26 | (United States) Luke Lonberger | 0 | 24.50 | 24.25 | 25 | 0 | 54.50 | 24.50 | 152.75 |
| 27 | (United States) Patrick Mordaunt | 24.50 | 0 | 0 | 24.50 | 30 | 0 | 61.25 | 140.25 |
| 28 | (Ghana) Tony Brakohiapa | 0 | 0 | 27 | 24.25 | 24.25 | 0 | 56 | 131.50 |
| 29 | (United States) Jeremy Lowe | 24.50 | 0 | 24.25 | 0 | 54.25 | 0 | 24.50 | 127.50 |
| 30 | (Greece) Dennis Mertzanis | 24.25 | 25 | 0 | 24.50 | 24.50 | 24.50 | 0 | 122.75 |
| 30 | (Japan) Taka Aono | 25 | 0 | 24.50 | 24.25 | 24.50 | 0 | 24.50 | 122.75 |
| 32 | (Ukraine) Miro Ovcharik | X | 0 | 34 | 24.25 | 24.25 | 0 | 0 | 82.50 |
| 33 | (Dominican Republic) Jhonnattan Castro | 0 | 0 | 0 | 24.25 | 54.25 | 0 | 0 | 78.50 |
| 34 | (United States) Danny George | 0 | 24.50 | 0 | 24.25 | 0 | 26 | 0 | 74.75 |
| 35 | (United States) Chris Ward | 0 | 0 | 24.50 | 24.25 | 0 | 25 | | 73.75 |
| 35 | (Canada) Alex Lee | X | 0 | X | X | 24.50 | 24.25 | 25 | 73.75 |
| 37 | (United States) Patrick Goodin | 0 | 24.50 | 0 | 0 | 24.25 | 24.25 | 0 | 73 |
| 37 | (United States) Nick D'Alesso | 24.25 | 0 | 0 | 24.25 | 0 | 0 | 24.50 | 73 |
| 39 | (United States) Roland Gallagher | 0 | X | X | X | X | 54.50 | 0 | 54.50 |
| 40 | (Canada) Dave Briggs | 0 | 0 | 0 | X | X | 24.25 | 25 | 49.25 |
| 40 | (Montenegro) George Marstanović | 25 | 24.25 | X | X | 0 | 0 | X | 49.25 |
| 42 | (United States) Corey Hosford | 0 | 24.25 | 24.50 | 0 | 0 | 0 | 0 | 48.75 |
| 43 | (Indonesia) Emmanuel Armandio | 28 | 0 | X | X | X | X | X | 28 |
| 44 | (United States) Kyle Pollard | 0 | X | X | X | 24.50 | 0 | X | 24.50 |
| 44 | (Canada) Ian Fournier | 0 | X | X | X | 0 | 24.50 | 0 | 24.50 |
| 46 | (United States) Ryan Bell | 0 | X | X | X | 0 | 24.25 | 0 | 24.25 |
| 46 | (United States) Ross Petty | 24.25 | X | X | X | X | X | X | 24.25 |
| 46 | (United States) Jeff Jones | 0 | 24.25 | 0 | 0 | 0 | 0 | 0 | 24.25 |
| 49 | (United States) Brad Hettinger | X | 0 | X | X | X | X | X | 0 |
| 49 | (United States) Gabe Stone | 0 | 0 | 0 | 0 | X | X | 0 | 0 |
| 49 | (United States) Mike Phillips | 0 | X | X | X | 0 | X | 0 | 0 |
| 49 | (Philippines) Cyrus Martinez | 0 | X | X | X | X | X | 0 | 0 |
| 49 | (United States) Andrew Coomes | 0 | 0 | 0 | 0 | 0 | 0 | 0 | 0 |
| 49 | (Mexico) Mauricio Ornelas | 0 | 0 | 0 | X | X | X | 0 | 0 |
| 49 | (Mexico) Enrique Mendoza | 0 | X | X | X | X | X | 0 | 0 |
| 49 | (United States) Nieko Gunther | 0 | X | X | X | X | X | X | 0 |
| 49 | (Hungary) Zoltán Hajdú | 0 | 0 | 0 | 0 | X | X | 0 | 0 |
| 49 | (United States) Nick Thomas | 0 | 0 | 0 | 0 | X | X | 0 | 0 |
| 49 | (Japan) Peter Funatake | 0 | X | X | X | X | X | X | 0 |
| 49 | (Sweden) Samuel Hübinette | X | X | X | X | X | X | X | 0 |
| 49 | (Canada) Patrick Cyr | X | X | X | 0 | X | X | X | 0 |
| 49 | (United States) Jeff Abbott | 0 | 0 | X | 0 | 0 | 0 | 0 | 0 |
| 49 | (United States) Joshua Guild | 0 | X | X | 0 | X | 0 | X | 0 |
| 49 | (Malta) Mike Skudlarek | X | 0 | 0 | 0 | 0 | 0 | 0 | 0 |
| 49 | (Mexico) Carlos Cano-Estrella | 0 | X | X | X | X | X | X | 0 |
| 49 | (Republic of Ireland) Eric O'Sullivan | X | X | X | X | X | X | X | 0 |
| 49 | (Republic of Ireland) Dean Kearney | X | X | X | X | 0 | X | X | 0 |
| 49 | (United States) Jason Bostrom | X | X | X | 0 | X | X | X | 0 |
| Pos | Driver | LBH | ATL | PBR | WTS | EVS | LVS | IRW | Points |
