= 2013 Formula D season =

2013 Formula D

Seasons
- ← 2012 2014 →

The 2013 Formula D season (officially titled Formula Drift Pro Championship) was the tenth season of the Formula D series. The season began on April 12 at Long Beach and ended on October 12 at Irwindale Speedway.

Michael Essa was crowned series champion, Lexus won the inaugural manufacturer’s championship and Hankook won the tire championship.

== Schedule ==
Round	Title	Venue	Location	Date	Winner	Car
1	Streets of Long Beach	(California) Streets of Long Beach	Long Beach, California	April 12 – 13	(Japan) Daijiro Yoshihara	Nissan 240SX
2	Road to the Championship	(Georgia (U.S. state)) Road Atlanta	Braselton, Georgia	May 10 – 11	(Japan) Daigo Saito	Lexus SC
3	Invasion	(Florida) Palm Beach International Raceway	Palm Beach, Florida	May 31 – June 1	(United States) Michael Essa	BMW M3
4	The Gauntlet	(New Jersey) Wall Township Speedway	Wall Township, New Jersey	June 21 – 22	(Japan) Daigo Saito	Lexus SC
5	Throwdown	(Washington (state)) Evergreen Speedway	Monroe, Washington	July 19 – 20	(United States) Chris Forsberg	Nissan 370Z
6	Showdown	Texas Motor Speedway	Fort Worth, Texas	September 13 – 14	(United States) Michael Essa	BMW M3
7	Title Fight	(California) Irwindale Speedway	Irwindale, California	October 11 – 12	(Japan) Daigo Saito	Lexus SC

== Results and standings ==
=== Championship standings ===
Event winners in bold.

Pos	Driver	LBH	ATL	PBR	WTS	EVS	TEX	IRW	Points
1	(United States) Michael Essa	62.00	79.00	**100.50**	55.00	90.00	**103.00**	66.00	555.50
2	(United States) Chris Forsberg	79.00	56.00	67.00	84.00	**102.00**	86.00	64.00	538.00
3	(Japan) Daigo Saito	57.00	**104.00**	96.00	**104.00**	24.00	24.50	**101.00**	510.50
4	(Norway) Fredric Aasbø	63.00	73.00	61.50	69.00	88.00	71.00	62.00	487.50
5	(United States) Vaughn Gittin, Jr.	92.00	80.00	72.00	56.00	37.00	73.00	71.00	481.00
6	(United States) Justin Pawlak	54.50	62.00	66.00	100.00	63.00	55.00	24.50	425.00
7	(United States) Matt Field	24.50	55.00	63.00	54.50	62.00	89.00	57.00	407.00
8	(Republic of Ireland) Darren McNamara	64.00	92.00	24.50	79.00	73.00	0.00	56.00	388.50
9	(Japan) Robbie Nishida	24.50	24.50	78.50	64.00	61.50	61.25	73.00	387.25
10	(Lithuania) Aurimas Bakchis	56.00	56.00	54.50	54.50	73.00	29.00	56.00	379.00
11	(Japan) Daijiro Yoshihara	**112.00**	25.00	58.00	24.25	25.00	65.00	24.25	333.50
12	(United States) Conrad Grunewald	0.00	54.50	56.00	64.00	56.00	54.50	24.50	309.50
13	(United States) Chelsea DeNofa	75.00	30.00	25.00	56.00	24.50	56.00	24.50	291.00
13	(United States) Ryan Tuerck	64.00	61.50	25.00	54.50	24.00	0.00	62.00	291.00
15	(United States) Tyler McQuarrie	24.25	0.00	54.25	65.00	55.00	0.00	92.00	290.50
16	(United States) Matt Powers	55.00	64.00	0.00	24.50	58.00	56.00	24.50	282.00
17	(United States) Forrest Wang	26.00	56.00	54.50	0.00	0.00	60.00	80.00	276.50
18	(Norway) Kenneth Moen	65.00	55.00	64.00	26.00	24.50	24.25	0.00	258.75
19	(United States) Ryan Kado	55.00	0.00	24.25	24.50	57.00	24.50	54.50	239.75
20	(United States) Danny George	24.25	25.00	24.25	55.00	24.25	54.50	24.25	231.50
21	(Japan) Kenshiro Gushi	62.00	0.00	0.00	24.50	55.00	26.00	55.00	222.50
22	(United States) Patrick Goodin	24.25	24.25	24.25	24.25	24.50	24.50	56.00	202.00
23	(United States) Patrick Mordaunt	54.50	24.25	0.00	0.00	24.25	72.00	24.25	199.25
24	(Japan) Toshiki Yoshioka	24.50	24.50	0.00	X	57.00	56.00	24.50	186.50
25	(Japan) Taka Aono	26.00	24.50	26.00	24.25	24.50	25.00	24.25	174.50
26	(United States) Kyle Mohan	24.50	61.50	24.25	26.00	0.00	0.00	24.25	160.50
27	(South Korea) Joon Woo-Maeng	24.50	54.25	24.50	0.00	24.50	24.25	0.00	152.00
28	(Ukraine) Miro Ovcharik	24.25	24.50	25.00	24.25	24.50	24.50	0.00	147.00
29	(Republic of Ireland) Dean Kearney	0.00	0.00	24.25	25.00	0.00	24.25	67.00	140.50
30	(United States) Tony Angelo	0.00	0.00	56.00	0.00	24.25	24.25	24.50	129.00
31	(United States) Jeff Jones	24.25	25.00	24.25	24.25	24.25	0.00	0.00	122.00
32	(Canada) Dave Briggs	0.00	24.50	64.00	0.00	X	0.00	24.50	113.00
33	(Canada) Mats Baribeau	X	0.00	28.00	0.00	X	55.00	25.00	108.00
34	(Dominican Republic) Jhonnattan Castro	24.50	0.00	0.00	25.00	24.25	0.00	24.25	98.00
35	(Greece) Dennis Mertzanis	24.25	0.00	0.00	X	55.00	0.00	0.00	79.25
36	(United States) Chris Ward	X	24.25	25.00	24.50	X	0.00	X	73.75
37	(Sweden) Carl Rydquist	24.25	0.00	0.00	24.25	X	0.00	24.25	72.75
38	(United States) Marc Landreville	X	X	X	54.50	X	X	X	54.50
39	(United States) Brandon Wicknick	0.00	0.00	24.50	0.00	24.25	0.00	0.00	48.75
39	(United States) Will Parsons	0.00	24.25	0.00	X	0.00	24.50	0.00	48.75
41	(United States) Nate Hamilton	0.00	24.25	0.00	24.25	0.00	0.00	0.00	48.50
41	(United States) Corey Hosford	0.00	24.25	0.00	24.25	0.00	0.00	0.00	48.50
41	(United States) Chris Jeanneret	0.00	X	X	X	24.25	24.25	0.00	48.50
41	(United States) Jeremy Lowe	X	X	24.25	0.00	X	24.25	X	48.50
45	(United States) Rob Primozich	0.00	X	X	X	0.00	24.50	0.00	24.50
46	(United States) Gabe Stone	0.00	X	0.00	X	0.00	24.25	0.00	24.25
46	(Mexico) Enrique Mendoza	24.25	X	X	X	0.00	0.00	0.00	24.25
46	(Poland) Luke Paluka	0.00	X	X	X	X	0.00	24.25	24.25
46	(United States) Walker Wilkerson	0.00	24.25	0.00	X	X	X	X	24.25
50	(United States) Joshua Steele	0.00	0.00	0.00	0.00	X	0.00	0.00	0.00
50	(United States) J. R. Hildebrand	X	X	X	X	0.00	0.00	0.00	0.00
50	(Canada) Alex Lee	0.00	X	X	X	0.00	X	0.00	0.00
50	(United States) Victor Moore	0.00	X	X	X	0.00	0.00	X	0.00
50	(United States) Nick Thomas	X	0.00	0.00	X	X	0.00	X	0.00
50	(Japan) Karl Osaki	0.00	0.00	X	X	X	X	0.00	0.00
50	(United States) Kory Keezer	0.00	X	X	X	0.00	X	X	0.00
50	(United States) Julian Jacobs	0.00	X	0.00	X	X	X	X	0.00
50	(United States) Jason Bostrom	X	X	X	X	X	0.00	X	0.00
50	(United States) Eric Hill	X	X	X	X	X	0.00	X	0.00
50	(United States) Mike Phillips	X	X	X	X	0.00	X	X	0.00
50	(Mexico) Carlos Cano-Estrella	0.00	X	X	X	X	X	X	0.00
50	(United States) Andy Hateley	0.00	X	X	X	X	X	X	0.00
50	(United States) Eugene Kretschmer	0.00	X	X	X	X	X	X	0.00
50	(South Africa) Otto Graven	X	X	X	X	X	X	X	0.00
50	(United States) Jeremy Richter	X	X	X	X	X	X	X	0.00
50	(United States) Doug Van Den Brink	X	X	X	X	X	X	X	0.00
Pos	Driver	LBH	ATL	PBR	WTS	EVS	TEX	IRW	Points

=== Manufacturer Cup ===
Pos	Manufacturer	Points
1	(Japan) Lexus	975.50
2	(Japan) Nissan	912.50
3	(United States) Ford	906.00
4	(United States) Scion	866.50
5	(Germany) BMW	846.00
6	(United States) Chevrolet	600.00
7	(Japan) Toyota	282.50
8	(Japan) Mazda	209.00
9	(Japan) Subaru	186.50
10	(United States) Dodge	140.50
11	(South Korea) Hyundai	79.25
12	(Japan) Infiniti	0.00

=== Tire Cup ===
Pos	Brand	Points
1	(South Korea) Hankook	1055.50
2	(Japan) Falken	1008.00
3	(Indonesia) Achilles	973.25
4	(Japan) Nitto	839.50
5	(Japan) Yokohama	788.00
6	(Chinese Taipei) Maxxis	698.00
7	(South Korea) Nexen	681.00
8	(Chinese Taipei) Kenda	79.25
