= 2011 Formula D season =

2011 Formula D

Seasons
- ← 2010 2012 →

The 2011 Formula D season (officially titled Formula Drift Pro Championship) was the eighth season of the Formula D series. The season began on April 9 in Long Beach and ended on October 8 at Toyota Speedway at Irwindale.

== Schedule ==
| Round | Event | Location | Date | Winner | Car |
|---|---|---|---|---|---|
| 1 | (California) Streets of Long Beach | Long Beach, California | April 9 | (United States) Justin Pawlak | (United States) Ford Mustang |
| 2 | (Georgia (U.S. state)) Road Atlanta | Braselton, Georgia | May 7 | (Japan) Daijiro Yoshihara | (Japan) Nissan 240SX |
| 3 | (Florida) Palm Beach International Raceway | Palm Beach, Florida | June 4 | (United States) Justin Pawlak | (United States) Ford Mustang |
| 4 | (New Jersey) Wall Township Speedway | Wall Township, New Jersey | June 18 | (United States) Conrad Grunewald | (United States) Chevrolet Camaro |
| 5 | (Washington (state)) Evergreen Speedway | Monroe, Washington | July 23 | (Japan) Daijiro Yoshihara | (Japan) Nissan 240SX |
| 6 | (Nevada) Las Vegas Motor Speedway | Las Vegas, Nevada | August 27 | (New Zealand) Rhys Millen | (South Korea) Hyundai Genesis Coupe |
| 7 | (California) Toyota Speedway | Irwindale, California | October 8 | (United States) Tyler McQuarrie | (Japan) Nissan 350Z |

== Championship standings ==
Event winners in bold.

| Pos | Driver | LBH | ATL | PBR | WTS | EVS | LVS | IRW | Points |
|---|---|---|---|---|---|---|---|---|---|
| 1 | (Japan) Daijiro Yoshihara | 88 | **106** | 26 | 86 | **106** | 58 | 58 | 528 |
| 2 | (United States) Justin Pawlak | **102** | 62 | **108** | 91 | 34 | 54.25 | 71 | 522.25 |
| 3 | (United States) Chris Forsberg | 70 | 64 | 81 | 65 | 89 | 60 | 79 | 508 |
| 4 | (Republic of Ireland) Darren McNamara | 58 | 90 | 88 | 55 | 54.5 | 90 | 69.25 | 504.75 |
| 5 | (United States) Tyler McQuarrie | 57 | 58 | 64 | 65 | 73 | 24.5 | **108** | 449.5 |
| 6 | (United States) Matt Powers | 94 | 57 | 61.25 | 61.25 | 55 | 90 | 26 | 444.5 |
| 7 | (United States) Ryan Tuerck | 63 | 59 | 54 | 69 | 63 | 62 | 67 | 437 |
| 8 | (United States) Conrad Grunewald | 66 | 36 | 64 | **106** | 28 | 57 | 56 | 413 |
| 9 | (New Zealand) Rhys Millen | 65 | 0 | 65 | X | 77 | **110** | 92 | 409 |
| 10 | (United States) Kyle Mohan | 69 | 26 | 54.5 | 55 | 61.5 | 57 | 54.5 | 377.5 |
| 11 | (United States) Vaughn Gittin, Jr. | 0 | 63 | 94 | 71 | 63 | 58 | 26 | 375 |
| 12 | (Norway) Fredric Aasbø | 61.5 | 55 | 28 | 24.5 | 81 | 54.5 | 25 | 329.5 |
| 13 | (Japan) Toshiki Yoshioka | 24.25 | 79 | 56 | 54.5 | 24.5 | 61.5 | 24.5 | 324.25 |
| 14 | (Japan) Kenshiro Gushi | 24.5 | 58 | 26 | 56 | 24.25 | 63 | 63 | 314.75 |
| 15 | (United States) Ross Petty | 55 | 24.5 | 24.5 | 56 | 24.25 | 24.25 | 54.5 | 263 |
| 16 | (Lithuania) Aurimas Bakchis | 24.25 | 24.5 | 24.25 | 54.5 | 58 | 69.5 | 0 | 255 |
| 17 | (United States) Michael Essa | 24.5 | 26 | 24.25 | 24.5 | 26 | 63 | 54.5 | 242.75 |
| 18 | (United States) Walker Wilkerson | 57 | 54.25 | 24.5 | 24.25 | 25 | 0 | 27 | 212 |
| 19 | (United States) Matt Field | 56 | 24.25 | 0 | 55 | 24.5 | 25 | 24.5 | 209.25 |
| 20 | (Republic of Ireland) Dean Kearney | 24.25 | 24.25 | 0 | 24.25 | 56 | 25 | 55 | 208.75 |
| 21 | (Greece) Dennis Mertzanis | 54.5 | 24.5 | 0 | 24.25 | 54.25 | 24.25 | 24.25 | 206 |
| 22 | (Hong Kong) Charles Ng | 24.5 | 24.25 | 54.5 | 24.5 | 24.5 | 24.5 | 24.25 | 201 |
| 23 | (South Africa) Otto Frank Graven | 24.25 | X | 55 | 55 | 24.5 | 25 | X | 183.75 |
| 24 | (United States) Matt Waldin | 55 | 55 | 24.5 | 24.5 | 0 | 24.25 | 0 | 183.25 |
| 25 | (South Korea) Joon Woo-Maeng | 24.5 | 32 | 26 | 26 | 57 | 0 | 0 | 165.5 |
| 26 | (United States) Patrick Mordaunt | 24.25 | 61.5 | 0 | X | 0 | 54.5 | 24.25 | 164.5 |
| 27 | (Japan) Ryan Kado | 0 | 0 | 54.5 | 26 | 24.25 | 26 | 24.5 | 155.25 |
| 28 | (Japan) Taka Aono | 24.25 | 24.25 | 55 | 24.25 | 0 | 0 | 24.5 | 152.25 |
| 29 | (Philippines) Cyrus Martinez | 24.5 | 24.25 | X | X | 54.25 | 24.25 | 24.25 | 151.5 |
| 30 | (United States) John Russakoff | 26 | 69.25 | 24.25 | 27 | 0 | 0 | 0 | 146.5 |
| 31 | (Sweden) Samuel Hübinette | 0 | 0 | 55 | X | X | 24.25 | 66 | 145.25 |
| 32 | (United States) Luke Lonberger | 0 | 0 | 24.25 | 24.25 | 24.25 | 0 | 55 | 127.75 |
| 33 | (United States) Jeff Jones | 24.25 | 24.25 | 24.25 | 0 | 24.25 | 24.25 | 0 | 121.25 |
| 34 | (Japan) Robbie Nishida | 0 | X | X | X | 24.25 | 34 | 64 | 120.25 |
| 35 | (Republic of Ireland) Eric O'Sullivan | 0 | 54.5 | 24.25 | 24.5 | X | X | 0 | 103.25 |
| 36 | (Canada) Alex Lee | 0 | X | X | X | 55 | 24.25 | 0 | 79.25 |
| 37 | (United States) Alex Pfeiffer | 24.5 | 0 | 24.5 | X | 24.5 | 0 | 0 | 73.5 |
| 38 | (Canada) Patrick Cyr | X | 24.5 | 24.5 | 0 | X | X | 24.25 | 73.25 |
| 38 | (Norway) Kenneth Moen | 0 | 24.5 | X | 24.5 | 0 | 0 | 24.25 | 73.25 |
| 40 | (United States) Mike Feiock | 24.25 | 24.5 | 24.25 | X | X | X | 0 | 73 |
| 41 | (United States) Jeff Abbott | 25 | X | X | X | X | 0 | 24.25 | 49.25 |
| 42 | (Indonesia) Emmanuel Armandio | X | X | X | X | X | 24.5 | 24.5 | 49 |
| 43 | (United States) Roland Gallagher | 0 | X | X | X | 24.5 | 0 | X | 24.5 |
| 43 | (United States) Kyle Pollard | 0 | X | X | X | 0 | 24.5 | 0 | 24.5 |
| 45 | (United States) Jim Guthrie | 0 | 0 | 0 | 24.25 | 0 | 0 | 0 | 24.25 |
| Pos | Driver | LBH | ATL | PBR | WTS | EVS | LVS | IRW | Points |
