= 2010 Formula D season =

Motorsport season

2010 Formula D

Seasons
- ← 2009 2011 →

The 2010 Formula D season (officially titled Formula Drift Pro Championship) was the seventh season for the Formula D series. The series began on April 10 on the streets of Long Beach and concluded on October 9 at Toyota Speedway at Irwindale after seven events.

With two victories at Long Beach and Infineon Raceway, Vaughn Gittin took his first Formula D title by 63.5 points, taking the first non-Nissan championship since 2006. Tanner Foust's Scion tC finished second in the championship, having taken victories at Evergreen Speedway and Irwindale, but Gittin's consistent finishing gave him the advantage over Foust. Ryan Tuerck finished third in the championship, despite not winning any of the seven events to be held. Daijiro Yoshihara finished fourth after taking successive victories at Road Atlanta and Wall Township Speedway. Darren McNamara completed the top five in the championship, while Tyler McQuarrie took the other event win at Las Vegas Motor Speedway.

== Schedule ==
Round	Title	Circuit	Location	Date	Winner	Car
1	Streets of Long Beach	(California) Streets of Long Beach	Long Beach, California	April 10	(United States) Vaughn Gittin Jr.	(United States) Ford Mustang
2	Road to the Championship	(Georgia (U.S. state)) Road Atlanta	Braselton, Georgia	May 8	(Japan) Daijiro Yoshihara	(Japan) Nissan 240SX
3	The Gauntlet	(New Jersey) Wall Township Speedway	Wall Township, New Jersey	June 5	(Japan) Daijiro Yoshihara	(Japan) Nissan 240SX
4	Throwdown	(Washington (state)) Evergreen Speedway	Monroe, Washington	July 10	(United States) Tanner Foust	(Japan) Scion tC
5	After Dark	(Nevada) Las Vegas Motor Speedway	Las Vegas, Nevada	August 21	(United States) Tyler McQuarrie	(Japan) Nissan 350Z
6	Point of Impact	(California) Infineon Raceway	Sonoma, California	September 11	(United States) Vaughn Gittin Jr.	(United States) Ford Mustang
7	Title Fight	(California) Toyota Speedway	Irwindale, California	October 9	(United States) Tanner Foust	(Japan) Scion tC

== Championship standings ==
Event winners in bold.

Pos	Driver	LBH	ATL	WTS	EVS	LVS	SON	IRW	Points
1	(United States) Vaughn Gittin Jr.	**108**	91	92	66	82	**101**	92	632
2	(United States) Tanner Foust	82	66	80	**103**	55	78.5	**104**	568.5
3	(United States) Ryan Tuerck	65	71	73	96	56	94	60	515
4	(Japan) Daijiro Yoshihara	56	**106**	**108**	56	91	65	32	514
5	(Republic of Ireland) Darren McNamara	60	63	79	84	56	54.5	81	477.5
6	(United States) Chris Forsberg	56	81	64	65	30	79	64	439
7	(New Zealand) Rhys Millen	100	58	24.5	55	54.25	61.25	64	417
8	(United States) Tyler McQuarrie	34	24.5	56	57	**104**	66	55	396.5
9	(Japan) Michihiro Takatori	54.25	24.25	63	71	27	56	78.5	374
10	(Sweden) Samuel Hübinette	64	56	55	56	73	26	27	357
11	(United States) Justin Pawlak	26	54.5	67	64	56	25	62	354.5
12	(United States) Conrad Grunewald	24.5	69	24.5	26	69	26	56	295
13	(Norway) Fredric Aasbø	72			62	24.5	65	56	279.5
14	(South Korea) Joon Woo-Maeng	24.25	56	0	55	55	55	26	271.25
15	(Japan) Kenshiro Gushi	25	61.5	55	62	0	24.5	24.5	252.5
16	(United States) Matt Powers	24.25	24.5	24.5	24.5	24.5	54.25	61.5	238
17	(Hong Kong) Charles Ng	24.25	25	56	61.25	62	0	0	228.5
18	(United States) Kyle Mohan	24.5	25	25	24.25	64	32	25	219.75
19	(United States) Ross Petty	24.5	54.5	58	24.5	24.5	27	0	213
20	(France) Stephan Verdier	54.5	24.25	57	24.25	0	26	24.5	210.5
21	(New Zealand) Mike Whiddett	0	24.25	24.5	24.5	56	24.25	56	209.5
22	(Japan) Ryuji Miki	56	25	24.25	0	25	54.5	24.25	209
23	(Ghana) Tony Brakohiapa	54.5	0	24.5	0	69.25	54.5	0	202.75
24	(Republic of Ireland) James Deane	61.5				24.5	61.5	54.5	202
25	(United States) Patrick Mordaunt	62	55	0	24.5	24.25	25	0	190.75
26	(Republic of Ireland) Dean Kearney	24.25	24.5	55	24.25	0	54.25	0	182.25
27	(United States) Alex Pfeiffer	25	0		24.25	61.5	27	24.25	162
28	(United States) Forrest Wang	54.5	24.25	54.5	24.25	0			157.5
29	(Japan) Taka Aono	25	24.5	0	28	24.25	24.5	24.5	150.75
30	(United States) Michael Essa	0	73	24.25	24.5	24.25		0	146
31	(Japan) Robbie Nishida	0	56	24.25	24.5	0	0	24.5	129.25
32	(Azerbaijan) Nikolay Konstantinov				54.5	24.25	24.25	24.25	127.25
33	(United States) Matt Field	0				24.5	24.25	54.25	103
34	(Greece) Dennis Mertzanis	24.25	24.25	24.25	0	0	24.25	0	97
35	(United States) Matt Waldin		24.25	24.5				25	73.75
36	(Republic of Ireland) Eric O'Sullivan	0	0	0	24.25	24.5	0	24.25	73
36	(United States) Bill Sherman	0	0	24.25			24.5	24.25	73
38	(United States) Brian Wilkerson		0	24.25	24.25	24.25		0	72.75
39	(Canada) Ian Fournier	0			0	0		61.25	61.25
40	(United States) Jeff Jones	0	0	0	0	24.5	24.25	0	48.75
40	(Philippines) Cyrus Martinez	0	24.25	24.5	0	0	0	0	48.75
40	(United States) Cody Parkhouse	0	24.25		24.5	0		0	48.75
40	(United States) Doug Van Den Brink		24.5	24.25				0	48.75
44	(United States) Jeff Abbott	24.25				24.25			48.5
44	(United States) Jodin LeJeune	24.25	0	0		0	0	24.25	48.5
46	(Japan) Yasuomi Kondo							24.5	24.5
46	(United States) John Russakoff	24.5						0	24.5
48	(Canada) Andrew Comrie-Picard	0	0	24.25	0	0		0	24.25
Pos	Driver	LBH	ATL	WTS	EVS	LVS	SON	IRW	Points
