= Graven =

Graven may refer to:

- Engraving, the practice of incising a design onto a hard, usually flat surface
- Graven (The Grave), a 2004 Swedish TV series starring Eva Melander
- Graven (surname)
- Graven (video game), a video game
- Graven, Aarhus, a street in Aarhus, Denmark
