= Graven (surname) =

Graven is a surname. Notable people with the surname include:

- Heather Graven, American atmospheric scientist
- Henry Norman Graven (1893–1970), American judge
- Otto Frank Graven (born 1975), South African racing driver
- Philip S. Graven (1892–1977), American doctor and psychoanalyst
- Raphael Graven (1979–2025), French streamer, influencer and comedian, better known by the pseudonym Jean Pormanove
