= Conrad Grunewald =

American racing driver (born 1979)

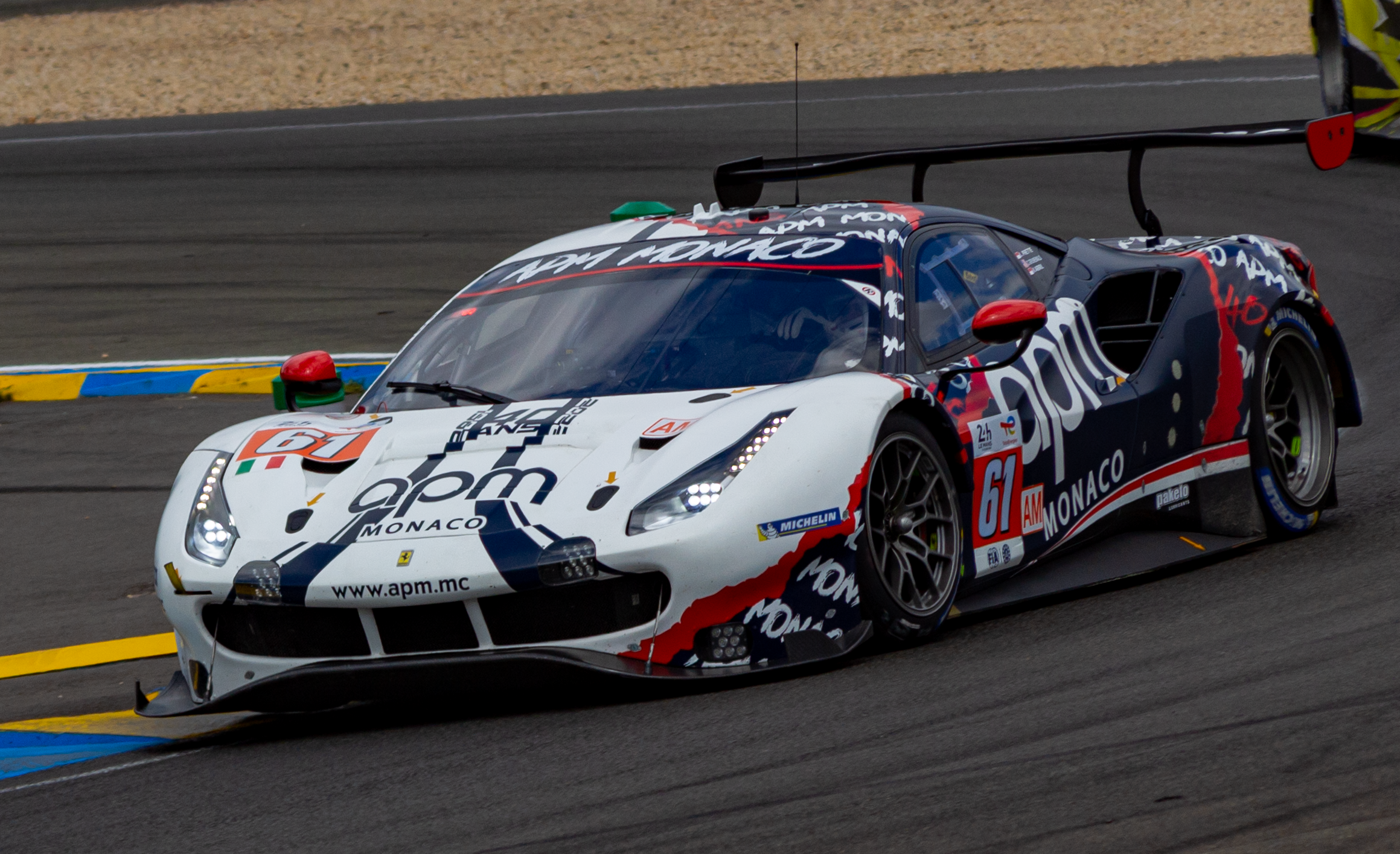
- Grunewald in 2022
- Nationality: (United States) American
- Born: April 22, 1979 (age 47) Houston, Texas, U.S.

GT World Challenge America
- Categorisation: FIA Bronze (2014–2022, 2027–); FIA Silver (2023–2026)
- Years active: 2017, 2021–2022, 2025–2026
- Teams: Scuderia Corsa; AF Corse; Triarsi Competizione; R3 Motorsports
- Starts: 23
- Wins: 0
- Podiums: 0
- Poles: 0
- Fastest laps: 0
- Best finish: 1st (Am) in 2021

Previous series
- 2023–2024 2023 2007, 2009–2010, 2014, 2023 2022 2022 2005–2015 2014: International GT Open; GT World Challenge Europe Endurance Cup; Michelin Pilot Challenge; European Le Mans Series; Asian Le Mans Series; Formula D IMSA SportsCar Championship

Championship titles
- 2021 2002: GT World Challenge America – Am; Skip Barber Midwest Championship

Conrad Grunewald (born April 22, 1979) is an American racing driver with experience in drifting, drag racing and road racing. From 2005 to 2015, Grunewald competed in Formula D. From 2021 to 2025, he was a Ferrari regular in GT World Challenge America, International GT Open and the 24 Hours of Le Mans.

== Career ==
Grunewald initially took up drag racing in 1995, before switching to road racing five years later at the Skip Barber Racing School in California. In 2002, Grunewald won the Skip Barber Midwest Championship title, before entering the drifting scene in 2004 by participating in the D1 Grand Prix, as part of the USA vs Japan shootout. Grunewald then moved to Formula D in 2005, scoring his maiden series podium at Houston to end the year 15th in points. Continuing in the series until 2015, Grunewald took his only event win in 2011 at Wall Township Speedway, as well as winning the KMC Wheels Super Drift Challenge four years later.

In parallel, Grunewald made his return to circuit racing in 2007, competing in the Grand Sport class of the KONI Challenge Series for BMW-fielding Automatic Racing. Competing in all but two races, Grunewald scored a best result of fourth at Watkins Glen to end the year 22nd in points. Grunewald then made select appearances in the series in a Ford Mustang for Rehagen Racing across 2009 and 2010, as well as a one-off return in 2014 for Berg Racing's Porsche Boxster in the ST class. That year, Grunewald also made his debut in GT3 competition, joining AIM Autosport for Petit Le Mans, driving their Ferrari 458 Italia GT3 alongside Bill Sweedler and Townsend Bell.

While working as a full-time driver coach for EMS Racing Team, Grunewald briefly returned to racing in 2017, making a one-off appearance in the SprintX GT Championship Series for R3 Motorsports at Circuit of the Americas. Sharing a Ferrari 458 Challenge with James Weiland in the GT Cup Am-Am class, Grunewald took a class win in race two.

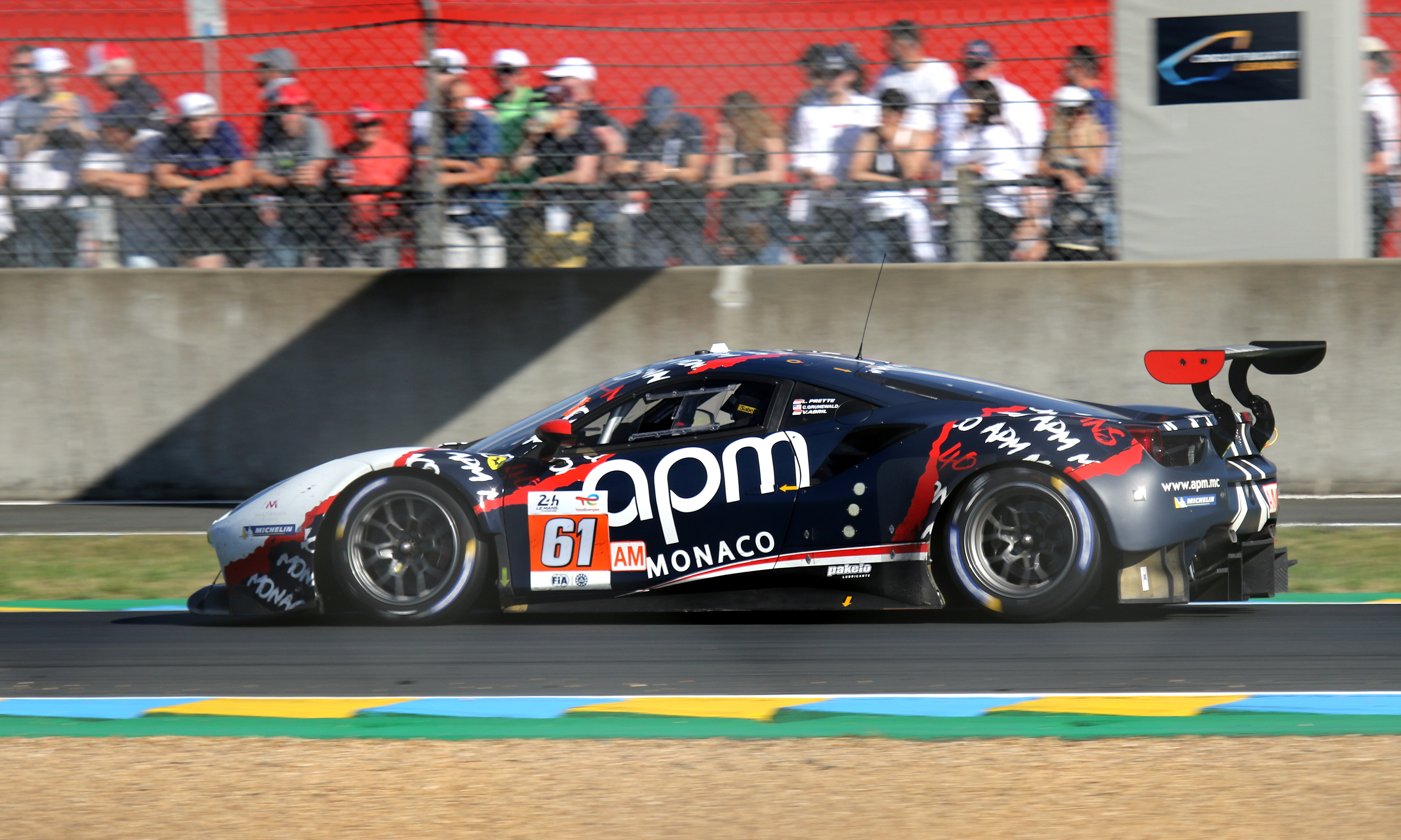
Grunewald's APM Monaco–branded Ferrari at the 2022 24 Hours of Le Mans.

In 2021, Grunewald joined Ferrari-affiliated AF Corse for his first full season in GT World Challenge America. Racing alongside Jean-Claude Saada, Grunewald won 12 of the 13 races in class en route to the Am title. Grunewald had his breakthrough as a bronze-rated driver in 2022, winning the January Gulf 12 Hours in GT3 Am before taking a triplet of GT class podiums in the Asian Le Mans Series. He then made his 24 Hours of Le Mans debut in June, sharing a Ferrari 488 GTE Evo with Louis Prette and Vincent Abril, who took LMGTE Am pole position. Grunewald himself took pole and won in an ELMS cameo at the 4 Hours of Spa-Francorchamps, partnering Mikkel Jensen and Frederik Schandorff at Kessel Racing in LMGTE, before winning the December Gulf 12 Hours in GT3 Am with AF Corse. Over in GT World Challenge America, Grunewald and Saada secured a pair of Am wins at Sonoma, but the season was cut short by a crash at VIR.

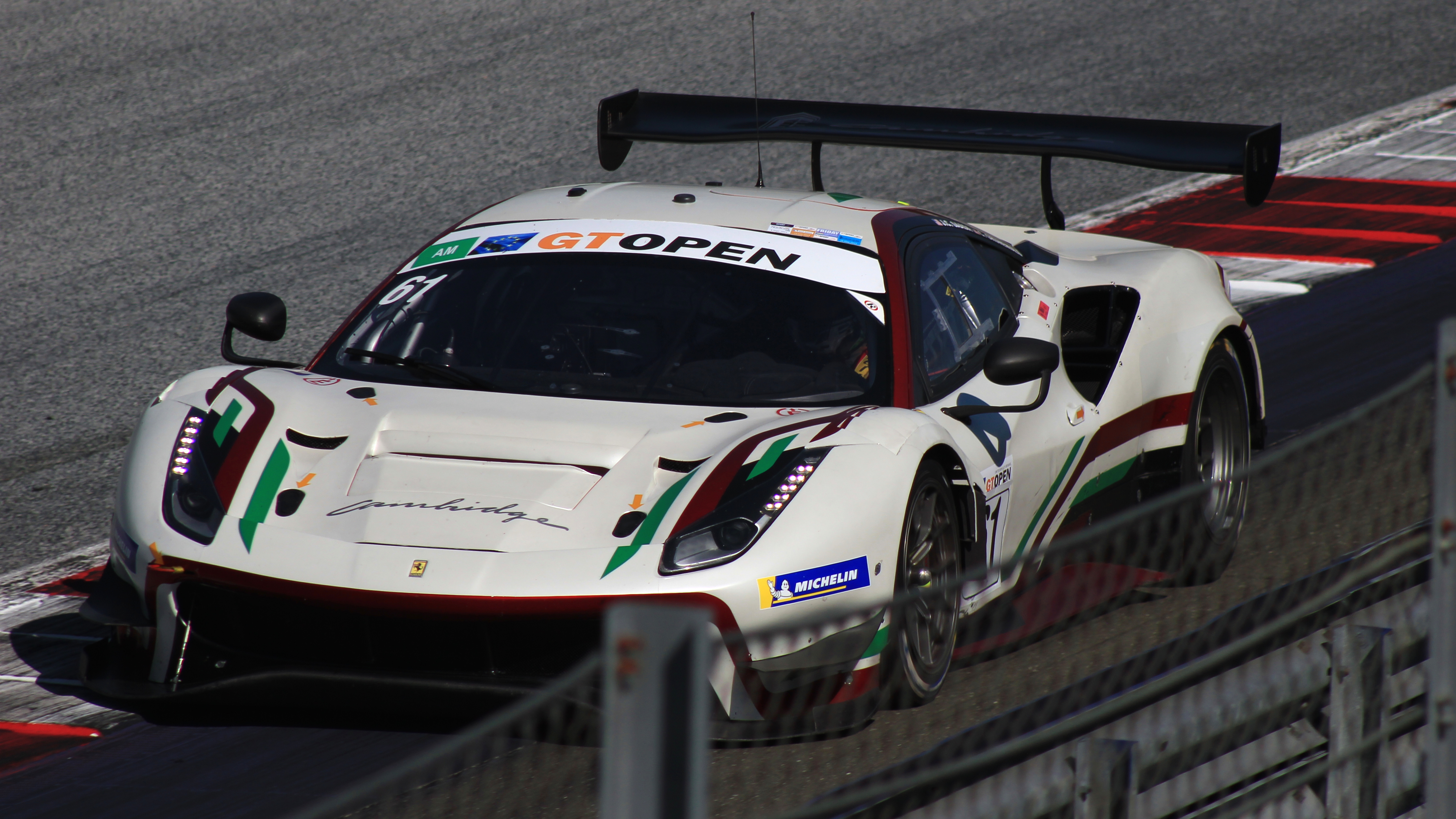
Grunewald driving for AF Corse in GT Open at the Red Bull Ring in 2023.

After an upgrade to FIA Silver in 2023, Grunewald joined AF Corse in the European-based International GT Open. Driving a Ferrari 488 GT3 Evo 2020 with Saada in the Am class, Grunewald scored a lone win at Spa and four other podiums to end the year third in points. That year, Grunewald also made a one-off appearance in Michelin Pilot Challenge for Aston Martin-fielding Archangel Motorsports, drove for McLaren-affiliated Garage 59 at the 24 Hours of Spa and returned to AF Corse for the Gulf 12 Hours. Grunewald then contested the first three rounds of International GT Open in 2024 for AF Corse, before winning the Indianapolis 8 Hour in 2025 in the Am class, and then returning a year later for Scuderia Corsa.

== Racing record ==
=== Racing career summary ===
Season	Series	Team	Races	Wins	Poles	F/Laps	Podiums	Points	Position
2002	Skip Barber Midwest Championship								**1st**
2005	Formula D		3	0	—N/a	—N/a	1	145	15th
2006	Formula D		2	0	—N/a	—N/a	0		
2007	Formula D		1	0	—N/a	—N/a	0		
2007	KONI Challenge Series – GS	Automatic Racing	7	0	0	0	0	145	22nd
2008	Formula D		7	0	—N/a	—N/a	0	349.25	9th
2009	Formula D		1	0	—N/a	—N/a	0	57	42nd
2009	KONI Sports Car Challenge – GS	Rehagen Racing	2	0	0	0	0	39	50th
2010	Formula D		7	0	—N/a	—N/a	0	295	12th
2010	Continental Tire Sports Car Challenge – GS	Rehagen Racing	1	0	0	0	0	21	84th
2011	Formula D		7	1	—N/a	—N/a	1	413	8th
2012	Formula D		7	0	—N/a	—N/a	0	359.75	9th
2013	Formula D		7	0	—N/a	—N/a	0	309.50	12th
2014	Formula D		7	0	—N/a	—N/a	0	262.50	10th
2014	Continental Tire Sports Car Challenge – ST	Berg Racing	1	0	0	0	0	19	72nd
2014	United SportsCar Championship – GTD	AIM Autosport	1	0	0	0	0	25	68th
2015	Formula D – Pro		7	0	—N/a	—N/a	0	145	24th
2017	SprintX GT Championship Series – GT Cup Am-Am	R3 Motorsports	2	1	1	1	2	48	**2nd**
2021	GT World Challenge America – Am	AF Corse	13	12	12	13	13	343	**1st**
2021	Intercontinental GT Challenge	AF Corse	1	0	0	0	0	0	NC
2022	Gulf 12 Hours (January) – GT3 Am	AF Corse	1	1	0	0	1	—N/a	**1st**
2022	Asian Le Mans Series – GT	AF Corse/APM Monaco	4	0	0	0	3	45	4th
2022	GT World Challenge America – Am	AF Corse	5	2	1	4	4	86	**2nd**
2022	24 Hours of Le Mans – LMGTE Am	AF Corse	1	0	0	0	0	—N/a	9th
2022	European Le Mans Series – LMGTE	Kessel Racing	1	1	1	0	1	26	17th
2022	GT World Challenge America – Pro-Am	Triarsi Competizione	1	0	0	0	0	0	NC
2022	Intercontinental GT Challenge	Triarsi Competizione	1	0	0	0	0	0	NC
2022	Gulf 12 Hours (December) – GT3 Am	AF Corse/APM Monaco	1	1	0	0	1	—N/a	**1st**
2023	Michelin Pilot Challenge – GS	Archangel Motorsports	1	0	0	0	0	200	49th
2023	International GT Open – Am	AF Corse	13	1	0	0	5	71	**3rd**
2023	GT World Challenge Europe Endurance Cup	Garage 59	1	0	0	0	0	5	23rd
2023	GT World Challenge Europe Endurance Cup – Bronze	Garage 59	1	0	0	0	0	24	15th
2023	Gulf 12 Hours – GT3 Am	AF Corse	1	0	0	0	0	—N/a	7th
2024	International GT Open – Pro-Am	AF Corse	5	0	0	0	0	3	29th
2025	GT World Challenge America – Am	AF Corse USA	1	1	0	0	1	0	NC†
2025	Intercontinental GT Challenge	AF Corse USA	1	0	0	0	0	0	NC
2026	GT World Challenge America – Am	Scuderia Corsa	1	0	0	1	1	0	NC†
2026	Intercontinental GT Challenge	Scuderia Corsa	1	0	0	0	0	0	NC

^{†} As Grunewald was a guest driver, he was ineligible to score points.

=== Complete Michelin Pilot Challenge results ===
(key) (Races in bold indicate pole position) (Races in italics indicate fastest lap)

Year	Entrant	Class	Make	1	2	3	4	5	6	7	8	9	10	11	12	Rank	Points
2007	Automatic Racing	Grand Sport	BMW M3	DAY	HMS	IOW; 6	LGA; 10	LIM; 34	MOS; 8	MOH; 33	WGL; 4	BAR; 37	TRO; 7	UTA; 21	VIR; 17	22nd	145
2009	Rehagen Racing	Grand Sport	Ford Mustang FR500C	DAY	HMS	NJMP; 12	LGA	LIM	WGL	MOH	BAR	TRO	UTA			50th	39
2009	Rehagen Racing	Grand Sport	Ford Mustang GT											VIR; 11		50th	39
2010	Rehagen Racing	Grand Sport	Ford Mustang GT	DAY	HMS; 21	BAR	VIR	LIM	WGL	MOH	NJMP	TRO	UTA			84th	21
2014	Berg Racing	Street Tuner	Porsche Boxster	DAY	SEB	LGA	LIM	KAN	WGL	MOS	IMS	ELK	VIR	COA; 12	ATL	72nd	19
2023	Archangel Motorsports	Grand Sport	Aston Martin Vantage AMR GT4	DAY; 11	SEB	LGA	DET	WGL	MOS	ELK	VIR	IMS	ATL			49th	200

=== Complete IMSA SportsCar Championship results ===
(key) (Races in bold indicate pole position; results in italics indicate fastest lap)

Year	Team	Class	Make	Engine	1	2	3	4	5	6	7	8	9	10	11	Pos.	Points
2014	AIM Autosport	GTD	Ferrari 458 Italia GT3	Ferrari 4.5L V8	DAY	SEB	LGA	DET	WGL	MOS	IMS	ELK	VIR	COA	PET; 7	68th	25

=== Complete Asian Le Mans Series results ===
(key) (Races in bold indicate pole position) (Races in italics indicate fastest lap)

Year	Team	Class	Car	Engine	1	2	3	4	Pos.	Points
2022	AF Corse/APM Monaco	GT	Ferrari 488 GT3 Evo 2020	Ferrari F154CB 3.9 L Turbo V8	DUB; 1; 3	DUB; 2; 3	ABU; 1; 3	ABU; 2 Ret	4th	45

=== Complete 24 Hours of Le Mans results ===
Year	Team	Co-Drivers	Car	Class	Laps	Pos.	Class Pos.
2022	(Italy) AF Corse	(France) Vincent Abril (Monaco) Louis Prette	Ferrari 488 GTE Evo	LMGTE; Am	339	42nd	9th

=== Complete European Le Mans Series results ===
(key) (Races in bold indicate pole position; results in italics indicate fastest lap)

Year	Entrant	Class	Chassis	Engine	1	2	3	4	5	6	Rank	Points
2022	Car Guy Racing by Kessel Racing	LMGTE	Ferrari 488 GTE Evo	Ferrari F154CB 3.9 L Turbo V8	LEC	IMO	MNZ	CAT	**SPA**; 1	ALG	17th	26

=== Complete International GT Open results ===
Year	Team	Car	Class	1	2	3	4	5	6	7	8	9	10	11	12	13	14	Pos.	Points
2023	AF Corse	Ferrari 488 GT3 Evo 2020	Am	ALG; 1; 20	ALG; 2 Ret	SPA; 7	HUN; 1; 21	HUN; 2; 21	LEC; 1; 14	LEC; 2; 18	RBR; 1; 17	RBR; 2; 23	MNZ; 1; 18	MNZ; 2; 18	CAT; 1; 9	CAT; 2; 21		3rd	71
2024	AF Corse	Ferrari 296 GT3	Pro-Am	ALG; 1; 14	ALG; 2; 19	HOC; 1 Ret	HOC; 2; 26	SPA; 17	HUN; 1	HUN; 2	LEC; 1	LEC; 2	RBR; 1	RBR; 2	CAT; 1	CAT; 2	MNZ	29th	3

=== Complete GT World Challenge Europe results ===
==== GT World Challenge Europe Endurance Cup ====
Year	Team	Car	Class	1	2	3	4	5	6	7	Pos.	Points
2023	Garage 59	McLaren 720S GT3 Evo	Bronze	MNZ	LEC	SPA; 6H; 11	SPA; 12H; 5	SPA; 24H; 34	NÜR	CAT	4th	75
