= 2017 SprintX GT Championship Series =

The 2017 SprintX GT Championship Series was the second season of the SprintX GT Championship Series. Dion von Moltke was the defending champion in the highest class, the Pro class in GT. It was the first season sanctioned by the United States Auto Club, after being under Sports Car Club of America sanctioning last year.

== Schedule ==
The calendar was revealed on 13 October 2016. The season comprised five rounds, all of which are headliners. Laguna Seca did not return on the schedule. Virginia, Lime Rock and Circuit of the Americas made their first appearance on the SprintX schedule.

Round	Date	Event	Circuit	Location
1	April 28–30	Nissan Grand Prix of VIR	Virginia International Raceway	Alton, Virginia
2	May 19–21	Pirelli World Challenge at CTMP	Canadian Tire Motorsport Park	Bowmanville, Ontario
3	May 26–27	Grand Prix of Lime Rock Park	Lime Rock Park	Lakeville, Connecticut
4	August 11–13	Grand Prix of Utah presented by Security National Mortgage	Utah Motorsports Campus	Tooele, Utah
5	September 1–3	Grand Prix of Texas	Circuit of the Americas	Austin, Texas

== Entry list ==
=== GT ===
Team	Car	No.	Drivers	Class	Rounds
(United States) TRG-AMR	Aston Martin V12 Vantage GT3	007	(United States) Drew Regitz	AA	1–3
(United States) TRG-AMR	Aston Martin V12 Vantage GT3	007	(United States) Kris Wilson	AA	1–3
(Mexico) De La Torre Racing	Aston Martin V12 Vantage GT3	04	(Philippines) Ate de Jong	AA	5
(Mexico) De La Torre Racing	Aston Martin V12 Vantage GT3	04	(Mexico) Jorge De La Torre	AA	5
(Canada) R. Ferri Motorsport	Ferrari 458 Italia GT3	013	(United States) Terry Borcheller	PA	2
(Canada) R. Ferri Motorsport	Ferrari 458 Italia GT3	013	(Canada) Marc Muzzo	PA	2
(Canada) R. Ferri Motorsport	Ferrari 458 Italia GT3	013	(United States) Drew Regitz	AA	4
(Canada) R. Ferri Motorsport	Ferrari 458 Italia GT3	013	(United States) Kris Wilson	AA	4
(Canada) R. Ferri Motorsport	Ferrari 488 GT3	61	(Canada) Kyle Marcelli	PP	1–2
(Canada) R. Ferri Motorsport	Ferrari 488 GT3	61	(Spain) Alex Riberas	PP	1–2
(United States) CRP Racing	Mercedes-AMG GT3	2	(United Kingdom) Ryan Dalziel	PP	All
(United States) CRP Racing	Mercedes-AMG GT3	2	(Canada) Daniel Morad	PP	All
(United States) Cadillac Racing	Cadillac ATS-V.R	3	(United States) Johnny O'Connell	PP	All
(United States) Cadillac Racing	Cadillac ATS-V.R	3	(United States) Ricky Taylor	PP	All
(United States) Cadillac Racing	Cadillac ATS-V.R	8	(United States) Michael Cooper	PP	All
(United States) Cadillac Racing	Cadillac ATS-V.R	8	(United States) Jordan Taylor	PP	All
(United States) Magnus Racing	Audi R8 LMS	4	(United States) Spencer Pumpelly	PP	All
(United States) Magnus Racing	Audi R8 LMS	4	(Germany) Pierre Kaffer	PP	1–2, 4–5
(United States) Magnus Racing	Audi R8 LMS	4	(United States) Dane Cameron	PP	3
(United States) Magnus Racing	Audi R8 LMS	44	(United States) John Potter	PA	All
(United States) Magnus Racing	Audi R8 LMS	44	(Germany) Marco Seefried	PA	1–2, 4–5
(United States) Magnus Racing	Audi R8 LMS	44	(United States) Andrew Davis	PA	3
(United States) K-PAX Racing	McLaren 650S GT3	6	(United States) Bryan Sellers	PP	All
(United States) K-PAX Racing	McLaren 650S GT3	6	(United Kingdom) Jonny Kane	PP	1–3
(United States) K-PAX Racing	McLaren 650S GT3	6	(United States) Michael Lewis	PP	4–5
(United States) K-PAX Racing	McLaren 650S GT3	9	(United Kingdom) Ben Barnicoat	PP	All
(United States) K-PAX Racing	McLaren 650S GT3	9	(Portugal) Álvaro Parente	PP	All
(United States) K-PAX Racing	McLaren 650S GT3	98	(United States) Mike Hedlund	PA	1–3
(United States) K-PAX Racing	McLaren 650S GT3	98	(United States) Michael Lewis	PA	1–3
(United States) Scuderia Corsa	Ferrari 458 Italia GT3	7	(Mexico) Martín Fuentes	AA	1–2
(United States) Scuderia Corsa	Ferrari 458 Italia GT3	7	(Sweden) Stefan Johansson	AA	1–2
(United States) GMG Racing	Porsche 911 GT3 R	14	(United States) James Sofronas	PA	All
(United States) GMG Racing	Porsche 911 GT3 R	14	(Belgium) Laurens Vanthoor	PA	1–2
(United States) GMG Racing	Porsche 911 GT3 R	14	(New Zealand) Matthew Halliday	PA	3
(United States) GMG Racing	Porsche 911 GT3 R	14	(France) Mathieu Jaminet	PA	4–5
(United States) Wright Motorsports	Porsche 911 GT3 R	16	(Belgium) Jan Heylen	PA	All
(United States) Wright Motorsports	Porsche 911 GT3 R	16	(United States) Michael Schein	PA	All
(United States) Wright Motorsports	Porsche 911 GT3 R	58	(United States) Patrick Long	PP	All
(United States) Wright Motorsports	Porsche 911 GT3 R	58	(Germany) Jörg Bergmeister	PP	1–2, 4–5
(United States) Wright Motorsports	Porsche 911 GT3 R	58	(Germany) Marc Lieb	PP	3
(United States) M1GT Racing	Audi R8 LMS ultra	23	(Canada) James Dayson	AA	1, 4–5
(United States) M1GT Racing	Audi R8 LMS ultra	23	(United States) Larry Pegram	AA	1
(United States) M1GT Racing	Audi R8 LMS ultra	23	(United States) Jason Bell	AA	4–5
(United States) M1GT Racing	Audi R8 LMS ultra	23	(Canada) James Dayson	PA	2–3 (Note: James Dayson and David Ostella also entered the makeup race at Circuit of the Americas.)
(United States) M1GT Racing	Audi R8 LMS ultra	23	(Canada) David Ostella	PA	2–3
(United States) M1GT Racing	Audi R8 LMS	24	(United States) Walt Bowlin	AA	5
(United States) M1GT Racing	Audi R8 LMS	24	(United Kingdom) Lars Viljoen	AA	5
(United States) MOMO/NGT Motorsports	Ferrari 458 Italia GT3	30	(Venezuela) Henrique Cisneros	AA	All
(United States) MOMO/NGT Motorsports	Ferrari 458 Italia GT3	30	(United States) Tyler McQuarrie	AA	1–3
(United States) MOMO/NGT Motorsports	Ferrari 458 Italia GT3	30	(United States) Jonathon Ziegelman	AA	4
(United States) MOMO/NGT Motorsports	Ferrari 458 Italia GT3	30	(United States) Peter Ludwig	AA	5
(United States) TR3 Racing	Ferrari 488 GT3	31	(Italy) Daniel Mancinelli	PP	All
(United States) TR3 Racing	Ferrari 488 GT3	31	(Italy) Andrea Montermini	PP	1
(United States) TR3 Racing	Ferrari 488 GT3	31	(Italy) Niccolò Schirò	PP	2–5
(United States) RealTime Racing	Acura NSX GT3	43	(United States) Tom Dyer	PP	All
(United States) RealTime Racing	Acura NSX GT3	43	(United States) Ryan Eversley	PP	All
(United States) RealTime Racing	Acura NSX GT3	93	(Netherlands) Peter Kox	PP	All
(United States) RealTime Racing	Acura NSX GT3	93	(Canada) Mark Wilkins	PP	All
(United States) Black Swan Racing	Mercedes-AMG GT3	54	(Netherlands) Jeroen Bleekemolen	PA	All
(United States) Black Swan Racing	Mercedes-AMG GT3	54	(United States) Tim Pappas	PA	All
(United States) DXDT Racing	Mercedes-AMG GT3	63	(United States) David Askew	PA	4
(United States) DXDT Racing	Mercedes-AMG GT3	63	(Canada) Aaron Povoledo	PA	4
(Canada) Always Evolving/AIM Autosport	Nissan GT-R Nismo GT3	75	(United States) Frankie Montecalvo	PA	All
(Canada) Always Evolving/AIM Autosport	Nissan GT-R Nismo GT3	75	(Mexico) Ricardo Sánchez	PA	All
(United States) Calvert Dynamics	Porsche 911 GT3 R	77	(United States) Preston Calvert	PA	All
(United States) Calvert Dynamics	Porsche 911 GT3 R	77	(United States) Alec Udell	PA	All
(Hong Kong) Absolute Racing	Bentley Continental GT3	78	(China) Luo Yufeng	PA	1–3
(Hong Kong) Absolute Racing	Bentley Continental GT3	78	(Switzerland) Alexandre Imperatori	PA	1–2
(Hong Kong) Absolute Racing	Bentley Continental GT3	78	(Macau) André Couto	PA	3
(Hong Kong) Absolute Racing	Bentley Continental GT3	78	(South Korea) Andrew Kim	PA	4
(Hong Kong) Absolute Racing	Bentley Continental GT3	78	(United Kingdom) Will Stevens	PA	4
(Hong Kong) Absolute Racing	Bentley Continental GT3	88	(Monaco) Vincent Abril	PP	All
(Hong Kong) Absolute Racing	Bentley Continental GT3	88	(Hong Kong) Adderly Fong	PP	All
(United States) McCann Racing	Audi R8 LMS	82	(United States) Andrew Davis	PP	1
(United States) McCann Racing	Audi R8 LMS	82	(United States) Mike Skeen	PP	1
(United States) McCann Racing	Audi R8 LMS	82	(United States) Mike Skeen	PA	5
(United States) McCann Racing	Audi R8 LMS	82	(United States) Michael McCann	PA	5
(United States) MCC Motorsports	Mercedes-AMG GT3	92	(Brazil) Alexandre Negrão	PA	1–2
(United States) MCC Motorsports	Mercedes-AMG GT3	92	(Brazil) Alexandre Negrão Sr.	PA	1–2
(United States) GAINSCO/Bob Stallings Racing	Porsche 911 GT3 R	99	(United States) Jon Fogarty	PP	4–5
(United States) GAINSCO/Bob Stallings Racing	Porsche 911 GT3 R	99	(Germany) Wolf Henzler	PP	4–5
(United States) DIME Racing	Lamborghini Huracán GT3	111	(Australia) J. D. Davison	PP	1
(United States) DIME Racing	Lamborghini Huracán GT3	111	(United States) Jonathan Summerton	PP	1

Icon	Class
PP	Pro-Pro
PA	Pro-Am
AA	Am-Am

=== GT Cup ===
Team	Car	No.	Drivers	Class	Rounds
(United States) DXDT Racing	Lamborghini Huracán LP 620-2 Super Trofeo	10	(United States) Jeff Burton	PA	4
(United States) DXDT Racing	Lamborghini Huracán LP 620-2 Super Trofeo	10	(United States) Brandon Davis	PA	4
(United States) Precision Driving	Ferrari 458 Challenge Evo	11	(Spain) Dani Clos	PA	1, 3
(United States) Precision Driving	Ferrari 458 Challenge Evo	11	(Serbia) Marko Radisic	PA	1, 3
(United States) R3 Motorsports	Ferrari 458 Challenge	18	(United States) Conrad Grunewald	AA	5
(United States) R3 Motorsports	Ferrari 458 Challenge	18	(United States) James Weiland	AA	5
(United States) Dream Racing Motorsport	Lamborghini Huracán LP 620-2 Super Trofeo	55	(Italy) Alessandro Bressan	PA	All
(United States) Dream Racing Motorsport	Lamborghini Huracán LP 620-2 Super Trofeo	55	(Japan) Yuki Harata	PA	All
(United States) Autometrics Motorsports	Porsche 911 GT3 Cup	90	(United States) Cory Friedman	AA	All
(United States) Autometrics Motorsports	Porsche 911 GT3 Cup	90	(United States) Joe Toussaint	AA	All
(United States) Tool Racing	Porsche 911 GT3 Cup	95	(United States) Erich Joiner	PA	3–5
(United States) Tool Racing	Porsche 911 GT3 Cup	95	(United States) Andy Lee	PA	3–5

=== GTS ===
Team	Car	No.	Drivers	Class	Rounds
(United States) VOLT Racing	McLaren 570S GT4	02	(United States) Alan Brynjolfsson	AA	2
(United States) VOLT Racing	McLaren 570S GT4	02	(United States) Chris Hall	AA	2
(United States) VOLT Racing	Ford Mustang	077	(United States) Alan Brynjolfsson	AA	3
(United States) VOLT Racing	Ford Mustang	077	(United States) Chris Hall	AA	3
(United States) TRG-AMR	Aston Martin Vantage GT4	03	(United States) Craig Lyons	AA	5
(United States) TRG-AMR	Aston Martin Vantage GT4	03	(United States) Kris Wilson	AA	5
(United States) TRG-AMR	Aston Martin Vantage GT4	09	(United States) Jerry Kaufman	PA	1–2
(United States) TRG-AMR	Aston Martin Vantage GT4	09	(United Kingdom) Kyle Tilley	PA	1–2
(United States) TRG-AMR	Aston Martin Vantage GT4	09	(United States) Derek DeBoer	AA	4–5
(United States) TRG-AMR	Aston Martin Vantage GT4	09	(United States) Jason Alexandridis	AA	4
(United States) TRG-AMR	Aston Martin Vantage GT4	09	(United States) Sean Gibbons	AA	5
(United States) GMG Racing	McLaren 570S GT4	04	(United States) Kenton Koch	PA	2
(United States) GMG Racing	McLaren 570S GT4	04	(United States) George Kurtz	PA	2
(United States) Case-it Racing	Porsche Cayman GT4 Clubsport MR	017	(United States) Trent Hindman	PA	All
(United States) Case-it Racing	Porsche Cayman GT4 Clubsport MR	017	(United States) Adam Merzon	PA	All
(United States) Case-it Racing	Porsche Cayman GT4 Clubsport MR	018	(United States) Philip Bloom	AA	1–3
(United States) Case-it Racing	Porsche Cayman GT4 Clubsport MR	018	(Canada) Cameron Cassels	AA	1–3
(United States) Stephen Cameron Racing	Aston Martin Vantage GT4	019	(United States) Ari Balogh	AA	1
(United States) Stephen Cameron Racing	Aston Martin Vantage GT4	019	(United States) Greg Liefooghe	AA	1
(United States) Stephen Cameron Racing	BMW M3 E92	019	(United States) Ari Balogh	AA	2–5
(United States) Stephen Cameron Racing	BMW M3 E92	019	(United States) Greg Liefooghe	AA	2–5
(United States) PF Racing	Ford Mustang	40	(United States) Ernie Francis Jr.	PA	2
(United States) PF Racing	Ford Mustang	40	(United States) James Pesek	PA	2
(United States) NOLAsport	Porsche Cayman GT4 Clubsport MR	47	(United States) Jason Hart	AA	1, 3–5
(United States) NOLAsport	Porsche Cayman GT4 Clubsport MR	47	(United States) Matt Travis	AA	1, 3–4
(United States) NOLAsport	Porsche Cayman GT4 Clubsport MR	47	(United States) Mike Vess	AA	5

== Race results ==
Round		Circuit	GT Pro-Pro Winning Car	GT Pro-Am Winning Car	GT Am-Am Winning Car	GT Cup Pro-Am Winning Car	GT Cup Am-Am Winning Car	GTS Pro-Am Winning Car	GTS Am-Am Winning Car
Round		Circuit	GT Pro-Pro Winning Driver	GT Pro-Am Winning Driver	GT Am-Am Winning Driver	GT Cup Pro-Am Winning Driver	GT Cup Am-Am Winning Driver	GTS Pro-Am Winning Driver	GTS Am-Am Winning Driver
1	R1	Virginia	#31 Ferrari 488 GT3	#16 Porsche 911 GT3 R	#007 Aston Martin; V12 Vantage GT3	#55 Lamborghini Huracán; LP 620-2 Super Trofeo	#90 Porsche 911 GT3 Cup	#017 Porsche Cayman; GT4 Clubsport MR	#019 Aston Martin Vantage GT4
1	R1	Virginia	(Italy) Daniel Mancinelli (Italy) Andrea Montermini	(Belgium) Jan Heylen (United States) Michael Schein	(United States) Drew Regitz (United States) Kris Wilson	(Italy) Alessandro Bressan (Japan) Yuki Harata	(United States) Cory Friedman (United States) Joe Toussaint	(United States) Trent Hindman (United States) Adam Merzon	(United States) Ari Balogh (United States) Greg Liefooghe
1	R2	Virginia	#2 Mercedes-AMG GT3	#54 Mercedes-AMG GT3	#30 Ferrari 458 Italia GT3	#55 Lamborghini Huracán; LP 620-2 Super Trofeo	#90 Porsche 911 GT3 Cup	#017 Porsche Cayman; GT4 Clubsport MR	#019 Aston Martin Vantage GT4
1	R2	Virginia	(United Kingdom) Ryan Dalziel (Canada) Daniel Morad	(Netherlands) Jeroen Bleekemolen (United States) Tim Pappas	(Venezuela) Henrique Cisneros (United States) Tyler McQuarrie	(Italy) Alessandro Bressan (Japan) Yuki Harata	(United States) Cory Friedman (United States) Joe Toussaint	(United States) Trent Hindman (United States) Adam Merzon	(United States) Ari Balogh (United States) Greg Liefooghe
2	R1	Mosport	#8 Cadillac ATS-V.R	#14 Porsche 911 GT3 R	#30 Ferrari 458 Italia GT3	#55 Lamborghini Huracán; LP 620-2 Super Trofeo	#90 Porsche 911 GT3 Cup	#40 Ford Mustang	#019 BMW M3 E92
2	R1	Mosport	(United States) Michael Cooper (United States) Jordan Taylor	(United States) James Sofronas (Belgium) Laurens Vanthoor	(Venezuela) Henrique Cisneros (United States) Tyler McQuarrie	(Italy) Alessandro Bressan (Japan) Yuki Harata	(United States) Cory Friedman (United States) Joe Toussaint	(United States) Ernie Francis Jr. (United States) James Pesek	(United States) Ari Balogh (United States) Greg Liefooghe
2	R2	Mosport	Race cancelled due to a heavy rain shower. The race will be replaced by a third race at Circuit of the Americas.						
3	R1	Lime Rock	#58 Porsche 911 GT3 R	#16 Porsche 911 GT3 R	#30 Ferrari 458 Italia GT3	#55 Lamborghini Huracán; LP 620-2 Super Trofeo	#90 Porsche 911 GT3 Cup	#017 Porsche Cayman; GT4 Clubsport MR	#077 Ford Mustang
3	R1	Lime Rock	(Germany) Marc Lieb (United States) Patrick Long	(Belgium) Jan Heylen (United States) Michael Schein	(Venezuela) Henrique Cisneros (United States) Tyler McQuarrie	(Italy) Alessandro Bressan (Japan) Yuki Harata	(United States) Cory Friedman (United States) Joe Toussaint	(United States) Trent Hindman (United States) Adam Merzon	(United States) Alan Brynjolfsson (United States) Chris Hall
3	R2	Lime Rock	#4 Audi R8 LMS	#16 Porsche 911 GT3 R	#30 Ferrari 458 Italia GT3	#55 Lamborghini Huracán; LP 620-2 Super Trofeo	#90 Porsche 911 GT3 Cup	#017 Porsche Cayman; GT4 Clubsport MR	#019 BMW M3 E92
3	R2	Lime Rock	(United States) Dane Cameron (United States) Spencer Pumpelly	(Belgium) Jan Heylen (United States) Michael Schein	(Venezuela) Henrique Cisneros (United States) Tyler McQuarrie	(Italy) Alessandro Bressan (Japan) Yuki Harata	(United States) Cory Friedman (United States) Joe Toussaint	(United States) Trent Hindman (United States) Adam Merzon	(United States) Ari Balogh (United States) Greg Liefooghe
4	R1	Utah	#93 Acura NSX GT3	#16 Porsche 911 GT3 R	#30 Ferrari 458 Italia GT3	#95 Porsche 911 GT3 Cup	#90 Porsche 911 GT3 Cup	#017 Porsche Cayman; GT4 Clubsport MR	#47 Porsche Cayman; GT4 Clubsport MR
4	R1	Utah	(Netherlands) Peter Kox (Canada) Mark Wilkins	(Belgium) Jan Heylen (United States) Michael Schein	(Venezuela) Henrique Cisneros (United States) Jonathon Ziegelman	(United States) Erich Joyner (United States) Andy Lee	(United States) Cory Friedman (United States) Joe Toussaint	(United States) Trent Hindman (United States) Adam Merzon	(United States) Jason Hart (United States) Matt Travis
4	R2	Utah	#31 Ferrari 488 GT3	#14 Porsche 911 GT3 R	#30 Ferrari 458 Italia GT3	#55 Lamborghini Huracán; LP 620-2 Super Trofeo	#90 Porsche 911 GT3 Cup	#017 Porsche Cayman; GT4 Clubsport MR	#47 Porsche Cayman; GT4 Clubsport MR
4	R2	Utah	(Italy) Daniel Mancinelli (Italy) Niccolò Schirò	(France) Mathieu Jaminet (United States) James Sofronas	(Venezuela) Henrique Cisneros (United States) Jonathon Ziegelman	(Italy) Alessandro Bressan (Japan) Yuki Harata	(United States) Cory Friedman (United States) Joe Toussaint	(United States) Trent Hindman (United States) Adam Merzon	(United States) Jason Hart (United States) Matt Travis
5	R1	Austin	#58 Porsche 911 GT3 R	#14 Porsche 911 GT3 R	#30 Ferrari 458 Italia GT3	#55 Lamborghini Huracán; LP 620-2 Super Trofeo	#90 Porsche 911 GT3 Cup	#017 Porsche Cayman; GT4 Clubsport MR	#019 BMW M3 E92
5	R1	Austin	(Germany) Jörg Bergmeister (United States) Patrick Long	(France) Mathieu Jaminet (United States) James Sofronas	(Venezuela) Henrique Cisneros (United States) Peter Ludwig	(Italy) Alessandro Bressan (Japan) Yuki Harata	(United States) Cory Friedman (United States) Joe Toussaint	(United States) Trent Hindman (United States) Adam Merzon	(United States) Ari Balogh (United States) Greg Liefooghe
5	R2	Austin	#31 Ferrari 488 GT3	#14 Porsche 911 GT3 R	#30 Ferrari 458 Italia GT3	#55 Lamborghini Huracán; LP 620-2 Super Trofeo	#18 Ferrari 458 Challenge	No finishers	#09 Aston Martin Vantage GT4
5	R2	Austin	(Italy) Daniel Mancinelli (Italy) Niccolò Schirò	(France) Mathieu Jaminet (United States) James Sofronas	(Venezuela) Henrique Cisneros (United States) Peter Ludwig	(Italy) Alessandro Bressan (Japan) Yuki Harata	(United States) Conrad Grunewald (United States) James Weiland	No finishers	(United States) Derek DeBoer (United States) Sean Gibbons
5	R3	Austin	#2 Mercedes-AMG GT3	#14 Porsche 911 GT3 R	#30 Ferrari 458 Italia GT3	#55 Lamborghini Huracán; LP 620-2 Super Trofeo	#90 Porsche 911 GT3 Cup	#017 Porsche Cayman; GT4 Clubsport MR	#09 Aston Martin Vantage GT4
5	R3	Austin	(United Kingdom) Ryan Dalziel (Canada) Daniel Morad	(France) Mathieu Jaminet (United States) James Sofronas	(Venezuela) Henrique Cisneros (United States) Peter Ludwig	(Italy) Alessandro Bressan (Japan) Yuki Harata	(United States) Cory Friedman (United States) Joe Toussaint	(United States) Trent Hindman (United States) Adam Merzon	(United States) Derek DeBoer (United States) Sean Gibbons

== Championship standings ==
=== Drivers' championships ===
Championship points were awarded for the first twenty positions in each race. The overall pole-sitter also received one point. Entries were required to complete 50% of the winning car's race distance in order to be classified and earn points.

Position	**1st**	**2nd**	**3rd**	**4th**	**5th**	**6th**	**7th**	**8th**	**9th**	**10th**	**11th**	**12th**	**13th**	**14th**	**15th**	**16th**	**17th**	**18th**	**19th**	**20th**	**Pole**
Points	25	23	21	19	17	15	14	13	12	11	10	9	8	7	6	5	4	3	2	1	1

==== Overall ====
Pos.	Driver	Team	VIR		MOS	LIM		UTA		AUS			Points
GT
1	(United States) Michael Cooper (United States) Jordan Taylor	(United States) Cadillac Racing	4	3	1	4	2	8	3	4	6	Ret	175
2	(United Kingdom) Ryan Dalziel (Canada) Daniel Morad	(United States) CRP Racing	5	1	6	6	9	9	8	3	5	1	172
3	(United States) Patrick Long	(United States) Wright Motorsports	6	30	**2**	**1**	**Ret**	3	6	1	8	2	163
4	(Italy) Daniel Mancinelli	(United States) TR3 Racing	1	4	13	25	10	2	**1**	2	1	Ret	162
5	(United States) Johnny O'Connell (United States) Ricky Taylor	(United States) Cadillac Racing	7	13	3	26	7	4	5	5	**2**	7	149
6	(United States) Spencer Pumpelly	(United States) Magnus Racing	28	5	5	2	1	Ret	9	6	10	3	141
7	(United Kingdom) Ben Barnicoat (Portugal) Álvaro Parente	(United States) K-PAX Racing	29	2	30	3	3	6	4	21	4	4	140
8	(Germany) Jörg Bergmeister	(United States) Wright Motorsports	6	30	**2**			3	6	1	8	2	136
9	(United States) Tom Dyer (United States) Ryan Eversley	(United States) RealTime Racing	19	11	11	5	5	5	2	9	9	6	135
10	(Italy) Niccolò Schirò	(United States) TR3 Racing			13	25	10	2	**1**	2	1	Ret	118
11	(United States) Bryan Sellers	(United States) K-PAX Racing	18	12	7	8	8	10	7	8	12	5	116
12	(Netherlands) Peter Kox (Canada) Mark Wilkins	(United States) RealTime Racing	Ret	14	9	7	6	**1**	11	Ret	7	8	111
13	(Monaco) Vincent Abril (Hong Kong) Adderly Fong	(Hong Kong) Absolute Racing	11	8	4	9	4	7	27	7	15	Ret	107
14	(Germany) Pierre Kaffer	(United States) Magnus Racing	28	5	5			Ret	9	6	10	3	93
15	(United States) James Sofronas	(United States) GMG Racing	10	15	8	12	19	12	12	10	11	**10**	92
16	(Belgium) Jan Heylen (United States) Michael Schein	(United States) Wright Motorsports	3	16	10	10	11	11	17	14	29	12	88
17	(United States) Michael Lewis	(United States) K-PAX Racing	16	18	17	28	18	10	7	8	12	5	79
18	(Netherlands) Jeroen Bleekemolen (United States) Tim Pappas	(United States) Black Swan Racing	22	**10**	20	13	13	16	14	**11**	13	11	71
19	(United Kingdom) Jonny Kane	(United States) K-PAX Racing	18	12	7	8	8						52
20	(France) Mathieu Jaminet	(United States) GMG Racing						12	12	10	11	**10**	51
21	(United States) Andrew Davis	(United States) McCann Racing	**2**	7									51
21	(United States) Andrew Davis	(United States) Magnus Racing				15	14						51
22	(Venezuela) Henrique Cisneros	(United States) MOMO/NGT Motorsports	15	17	15	16	15	18	18	15	16	15	50
23	(United States) Mike Skeen	(United States) McCann Racing	**2**	7							14	17	49
24	(United States) Dane Cameron	(United States) Magnus Racing				2	1						48
25	(United States) Frankie Montecalvo (Mexico) Ricardo Sánchez	(Canada) Always Evolving/AIM Autosport	Ret	20	14	11	12	21	13	12	17	DNS	48
26	(United States) John Potter	(United States) Magnus Racing	31	25	16	15	14	13	15	13	Ret	13	48
27	(United States) Jon Fogarty (Germany) Wolf Henzler	(United States) GAINSCO/Bob Stallings Racing						19	10		3	9	46
28	(Italy) Andrea Montermini	(United States) TR3 Racing	1	4									44
29	(United States) Preston Calvert (United States) Alec Udell	(United States) Calvert Dynamics	14	Ret	18	17	20	15	16	16	Ret	14	38
30	(China) Luo Yufeng	(Hong Kong) Absolute Racing	8	19	12	14	16						36
31	(Germany) Marco Seefried	(United States) Magnus Racing	31	25	16			13	15	13	Ret	13	35
32	(Belgium) Laurens Vanthoor	(United States) GMG Racing	10	15	8								30
33	(Germany) Marc Lieb	(United States) Wright Motorsports				**1**	**Ret**						27
34	(Canada) Kyle Marcelli (Spain) Alex Riberas	(Canada) R. Ferri Motorsport	9	6	DNS								27
35	(United States) Tyler McQuarrie	(United States) MOMO/NGT Motorsports	15	17	15	16	15						27
36	(Switzerland) Alexandre Imperatori	(Hong Kong) Absolute Racing	8	19	12								24
37	(Australia) J. D. Davison (United States) Jonathan Summerton	(United States) DIME Racing	13	9									20
38	(United States) Drew Regitz (United States) Kris Wilson	(United States) TRG-AMR	12	21	23	18	17						19
38	(United States) Drew Regitz (United States) Kris Wilson	(Canada) R. Ferri Motorsport						20	19				19
39	(United States) Peter Ludwig	(United States) MOMO/NGT Motorsports								15	16	15	17
40	(United States) Mike Hedlund	(United States) K-PAX Racing	16	18	17	28	18						15
41	(Macau) André Couto	(Hong Kong) Absolute Racing				14	16						12
42	(New Zealand) Matthew Halliday	(United States) GMG Racing				12	19						11
43	(United States) Michael McCann	(United States) McCann Racing									14	17	11
44	(Canada) James Dayson	(United States) M1GT Racing	27	24	21	WD	WD	23	21	17	20	18	11
45	(South Korea) Andrew Kim (United Kingdom) Will Stevens	(Hong Kong) Absolute Racing						14	31				7
46	(United States) Jason Bell	(United States) M1GT Racing						23	21		20	18	7
47	(United States) Walt Bowlin (United Kingdom) Lars Viljoen	(United States) M1GT Racing									26	16	6
48	(United States) Jonathon Ziegelman	(United States) MOMO/NGT Motorsports						18	18				6
49	(Canada) David Ostella	(United States) M1GT Racing			21	WD	WD			17			4
50	(United States) David Askew (Canada) Aaron Povoledo	(United States) DXDT Racing						17	28				4
51	(Brazil) Alexandre Negrão (Brazil) Alexandre Negrão Sr.	(United States) MCC Motorsports	17	31	WD								4
52	(Philippines) Ate de Jong (Mexico) Jorge De La Torre	(Mexico) De La Torre Racing									23	23	4
53	(United States) Terry Borcheller (Canada) Marc Muzzo	(Canada) R. Ferri Motorsport			19								2
54	(United States) Larry Pegram	(United States) M1GT Racing	27	24									0
55	(Mexico) Martín Fuentes (Sweden) Stefan Johansson	(United States) Scuderia Corsa	30	27	WD								0
GT Cup (Note: No points were awarded in the overall GT Cup and GTS classes, because there were no Pro-Pro GT Cup and Pro-Pro GTS entries.)
	(Italy) Alessandro Bressan (Japan) Yuki Harata	(United States) Dream Racing Motorsport	20	**22**	**22**	**19**	**21**	**25**	20	**18**	18	**19**	
	(United States) Erich Joiner (United States) Andy Lee	(United States) Tool Racing				20	24	22	22		22	20	
	(United States) Cory Friedman (United States) Joe Toussaint	(United States) Autometrics Motorsports	**21**	23	24	21	23	24	24	19	21	21	
	(United States) Conrad Grunewald (United States) James Weiland	(United States) R3 Motorsports									**19**	22	
	(United States) Jeff Burton (United States) Brandon Davis	(United States) DXDT Racing						26	**23**				
	(Spain) Dani Clos (Serbia) Marko Radisic	(United States) Precision Driving	WD	WD		22	22						
	(United States) Tom Haacker (United States) Sloan Urry	(United States) TruSpeed AutoSport						WD	WD				
GTS
	(United States) Trent Hindman (United States) Adam Merzon	(United States) Case-it Racing	24	28	26	23	**25**	29	**26**	**20**	Ret	28	
	(United States) Ari Balogh (United States) Greg Liefooghe	(United States) Stephen Cameron Racing	**23**	**26**	**27**	27	26	30	29	22	27	25	
	(United States) Derek DeBoer	(United States) TRG-AMR						28	30		24	**24**	
	(United States) Sean Gibbons	(United States) TRG-AMR									24	**24**	
	(United States) Ernie Francis Jr. (United States) James Pesek	(United States) PF Racing			25								
	(United States) Jason Hart	(United States) NOLAsport	WD	WD		WD	WD	**27**	25		25	26	
	(United States) Matt Travis	(United States) NOLAsport	WD	WD		WD	WD	**27**	25				
	(United States) Mike Vess	(United States) NOLAsport									25	26	
	(United States) Alan Brynjolfsson (United States) Chris Hall	(United States) VOLT Racing			29	**24**	DNS						
	(United States) Philip Bloom (Canada) Cameron Cassels	(United States) Case-it Racing	25	29	WD	WD	WD						
	(United States) Jerry Kaufman (United Kingdom) Kyle Tilley	(United States) TRG-AMR	26	Ret	28								
	(United States) Jason Alexandridis	(United States) TRG-AMR						28	30				
	(United States) Craig Lyons (United States) Kris Wilson	(United States) TRG-AMR									**28**	27	
	(United States) Kenton Koch (United States) George Kurtz	(United States) GMG Racing			Ret								
Pos.	Driver	Team	VIR		MOS	LIM		UTA		AUS			Points

Key
Colour	Result
Gold	Race winner
Silver	2nd place
Bronze	3rd place
Green	Points finish
Blue	Non-points finish
Blue	Non-classified finish (NC)
Purple	Did not finish (Ret)
Black	Disqualified (DSQ)
Black	Excluded (EX)
White	Did not start (DNS)
White	Race cancelled (C)
White	Withdrew (WD)
Blank	Did not participate

**Bold** – Pole position
Italics – Fastest Lap

==== Pro-Am ====
Pos.	Driver	Team	VIR		MOS	LIM		UTA		AUS			Points
GT
1	(United States) James Sofronas	(United States) GMG Racing	10	15	8	12	19	12	12	10	11	**10**	227
2	(Belgium) Jan Heylen (United States) Michael Schein	(United States) Wright Motorsports	3	16	10	10	11	11	17	14	29	12	214
3	(Netherlands) Jeroen Bleekemolen (United States) Tim Pappas	(United States) Black Swan Racing	22	**10**	20	13	**13**	16	**14**	**11**	13	11	192
4	(United States) Frankie Montecalvo (Mexico) Ricardo Sánchez	(Canada) Always Evolving/AIM Autosport	**Ret**	20	**14**	**11**	12	**21**	13	12	**17**	DNS	156
5	(United States) John Potter	(United States) Magnus Racing	31	25	16	15	14	13	15	13	Ret	13	156
6	(United States) Preston Calvert (United States) Alec Udell	(United States) Calvert Dynamics	14	Ret	18	17	20	15	16	16	Ret	14	126
7	(France) Mathieu Jaminet	(United States) GMG Racing						12	12	10	11	**10**	123
8	(Germany) Marco Seefried	(United States) Magnus Racing	31	25	16			13	15	13	Ret	13	122
9	(China) Luo Yufeng	(Hong Kong) Absolute Racing	8	19	12	14	16						95
10	(United States) Mike Hedlund (United States) Michael Lewis	(United States) K-PAX Racing	16	18	17	28	18						79
11	(Belgium) Laurens Vanthoor	(United States) GMG Racing	10	15	8								69
12	(Switzerland) Alexandre Imperatori	(Hong Kong) Absolute Racing	8	19	12								61
13	(United States) Michael McCann (United States) Mike Skeen	(United States) McCann Racing									14	17	36
14	(New Zealand) Matthew Halliday	(United States) GMG Racing				12	19						35
15	(United States) Andrew Davis	(United States) Magnus Racing				15	14						34
16	(Macau) André Couto	(Hong Kong) Absolute Racing				14	16						34
17	(South Korea) Andrew Kim (United Kingdom) Will Stevens	(Hong Kong) Absolute Racing						14	31				32
18	(Brazil) Alexandre Negrão (Brazil) Alexandre Negrão Sr.	(United States) MCC Motorsports	17	31	WD								28
19	(United States) David Askew (Canada) Aaron Povoledo	(United States) DXDT Racing						17	28				28
20	(Canada) James Dayson (Canada) David Ostella	(United States) M1GT Racing			21	WD	WD			17			25
21	(United States) Terry Borcheller (Canada) Marc Muzzo	(Canada) R. Ferri Motorsport			19								13
GT Cup
1	(Italy) Alessandro Bressan (Japan) Yuki Harata	(United States) Dream Racing Motorsport	**20**	**22**	**22**	**19**	**21**	**25**	20	**18**	**18**	**19**	248
2	(United States) Erich Joiner (United States) Andy Lee	(United States) Tool Racing				20	24	22	22		22	20	138
3	(Spain) Dani Clos (Serbia) Marko Radisic	(United States) Precision Driving	WD	WD		22	22						44
4	(United States) Jeff Burton (United States) Brandon Davis	(United States) DXDT Racing						26	**23**				42
	(United States) Tom Haacker (United States) Sloan Urry	(United States) TruSpeed AutoSport						WD	WD				0
GTS
1	(United States) Trent Hindman (United States) Adam Merzon	(United States) Case-it Racing	**24**	**28**	26	**23**	**25**	**29**	**26**	**20**	**Ret**	**28**	223
2	(United States) Jerry Kaufman (United Kingdom) Kyle Tilley	(United States) TRG-AMR	26	Ret	28								44
3	(United States) Ernie Francis Jr. (United States) James Pesek	(United States) PF Racing			25								25
4	(United States) Kenton Koch (United States) George Kurtz	(United States) GMG Racing			**Ret**								0
Pos.	Driver	Team	VIR		MOS	LIM		UTA		AUS			Points

==== Am-Am ====
Pos.	Driver	Team	VIR		MOS	LIM		UTA		AUS			Points
GT
1	(Venezuela) Henrique Cisneros	(United States) MOMO/NGT Motorsports	**15**	**17**	**15**	**16**	**15**	18	18	**15**	**16**	**15**	248
2	(United States) Drew Regitz (United States) Kris Wilson	(United States) TRG-AMR	12	21	23	18	17						163
2	(United States) Drew Regitz (United States) Kris Wilson	(Canada) R. Ferri Motorsport						**20**	**19**				163
3	(Canada) James Dayson	(United States) M1GT Racing	27	24				23	21		20	18	128
4	(United States) Tyler McQuarrie	(United States) MOMO/NGT Motorsports	**15**	**17**	**15**	**16**	**15**						123
5	(United States) Jason Bell	(United States) M1GT Racing						23	21		20	18	86
6	(United States) Peter Ludwig	(United States) MOMO/NGT Motorsports								**15**	**16**	**15**	75
7	(United States) Jonathon Ziegelman	(United States) MOMO/NGT Motorsports						18	18				50
8	(United States) Walt Bowlin (United Kingdom) Lars Viljoen	(United States) M1GT Racing									26	16	42
9	(United States) Larry Pegram	(United States) M1GT Racing	27	24									42
10	(Philippines) Ate de Jong (Mexico) Jorge De La Torre	(Mexico) De La Torre Racing									23	23	40
11	(Mexico) Martín Fuentes (Sweden) Stefan Johansson	(United States) Scuderia Corsa	30	27	WD								38
GT Cup
1	(United States) Cory Friedman (United States) Joe Toussaint	(United States) Autometrics Motorsports	**21**	**23**	**24**	**21**	**23**	**24**	**24**	**19**	21	21	248
2	(United States) Conrad Grunewald (United States) James Weiland	(United States) R3 Motorsports									**19**	**22**	48
GTS
1	(United States) Ari Balogh (United States) Greg Liefooghe	(United States) Stephen Cameron Racing	**23**	**26**	**27**	27	26	30	29	**22**	27	25	236
2	(United States) Jason Hart	(United States) NOLAsport	WD	WD		WD	WD	**27**	**25**		25	26	94
3	(United States) Derek DeBoer	(United States) TRG-AMR						28	30		24	**24**	94
4	(United States) Matt Travis	(United States) NOLAsport	WD	WD		WD	WD	**27**	**25**				50
5	(United States) Sean Gibbons	(United States) TRG-AMR									24	**24**	50
6	(United States) Alan Brynjolfsson (United States) Chris Hall	(United States) VOLT Racing			29	**24**	**DNS**						48
7	(United States) Philip Bloom (Canada) Cameron Cassels	(United States) Case-it Racing	25	29	WD	WD	WD						46
8	(United States) Jason Alexandridis	(United States) TRG-AMR						28	30				44
8	(United States) Mike Vess	(United States) NOLAsport									25	26	44
10	(United States) Craig Lyons (United States) Kris Wilson	(United States) TRG-AMR									**28**	27	38
Pos.	Driver	Team	VIR		MOS	LIM		UTA		AUS			Points
