= Mike Kojima =

American automotive journalist

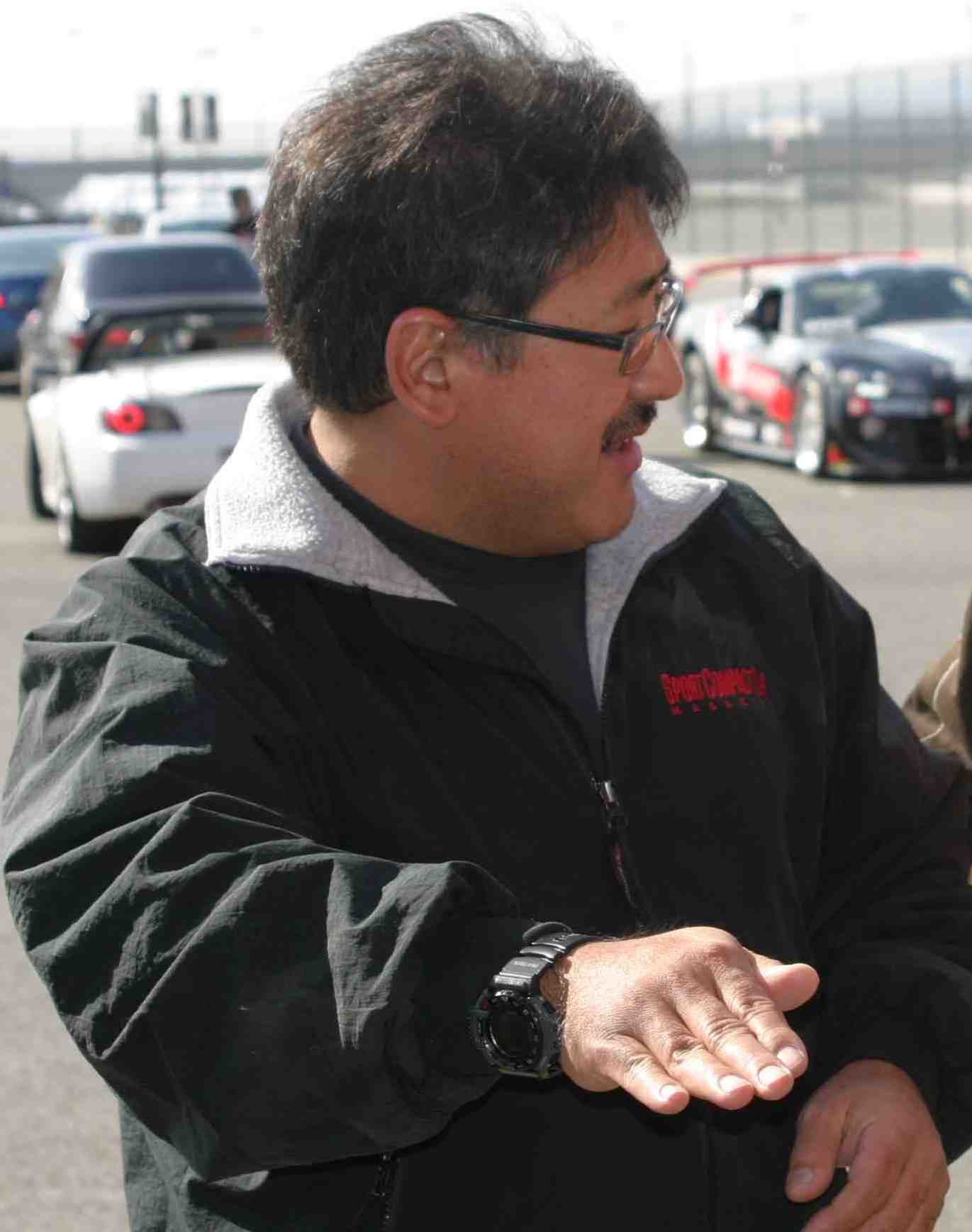
Mike Kojima

Mike Kojima is a long-time editor of Nissan Performance Magazine, Turbo and High-Tech Performance, Project Car and Import Tuner magazines, and was an editor for Sport Compact Car (which sponsored the Ultimate Street Car Challenge). Kojima has also written several books on Honda Tuning and General Tech. His self-professed "reputation" is that of a "nerd" (having worked both for Nissan and TRD as an engineer). His columns (and indeed his vehicles) reflect the highly technical approach he takes to making power. One such example is his famous "dog car," an underpowered Nissan Sentra besting many more powerful vehicles (such as Subaru Impreza WRX STIs) on road courses. He has also been a popular figure on internet forums and mailing lists for many years, such as the SE-R list, which focuses on Nissan SR engines and Twinturbo.net.

Kojima was severely injured in a 2006 racing accident. He has been working on several new race cars, the Dog II, a B14 Nissan Sentra powered by a SR20VE engine and the Dog III a Time Attack Nitto Tire sponsored B15 Sentra powered by a 500+ hp turbocharged QR25 engine.

He is currently working on several web projects 370z.com, a site devoted to the new Nissan 370Z and motoIQ.com, a technical performance site styled after the late Sport Compact Car Magazine.

Kojima works as a chassis engineer for the Daijiro Yoshihara in the Formula D and as a team member is part of the cast of Behind the Smoke series on GTChannel.

== Gallery ==
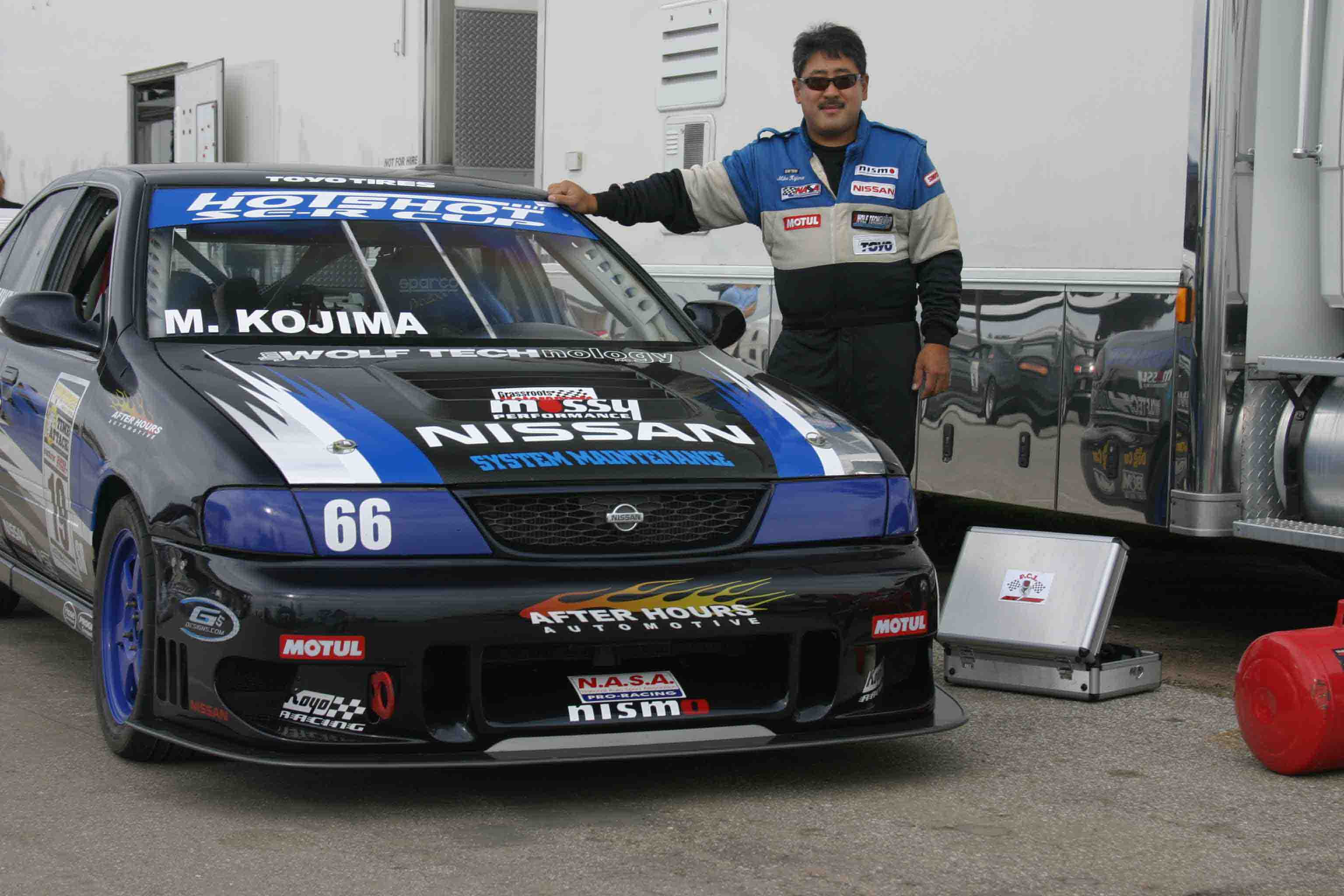
Mike Kojima and the Dog Car

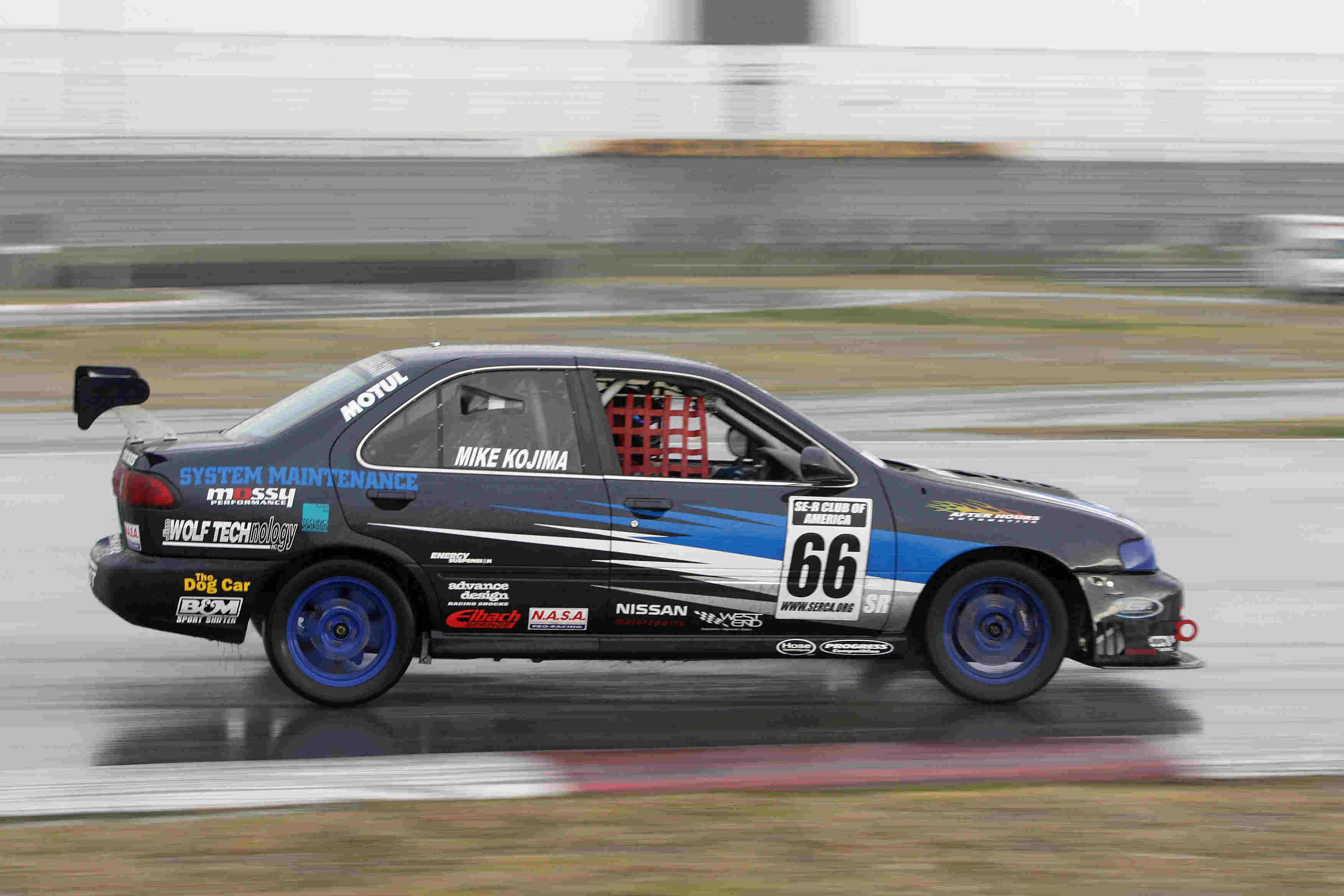
The Dog Car Racing in the Rain

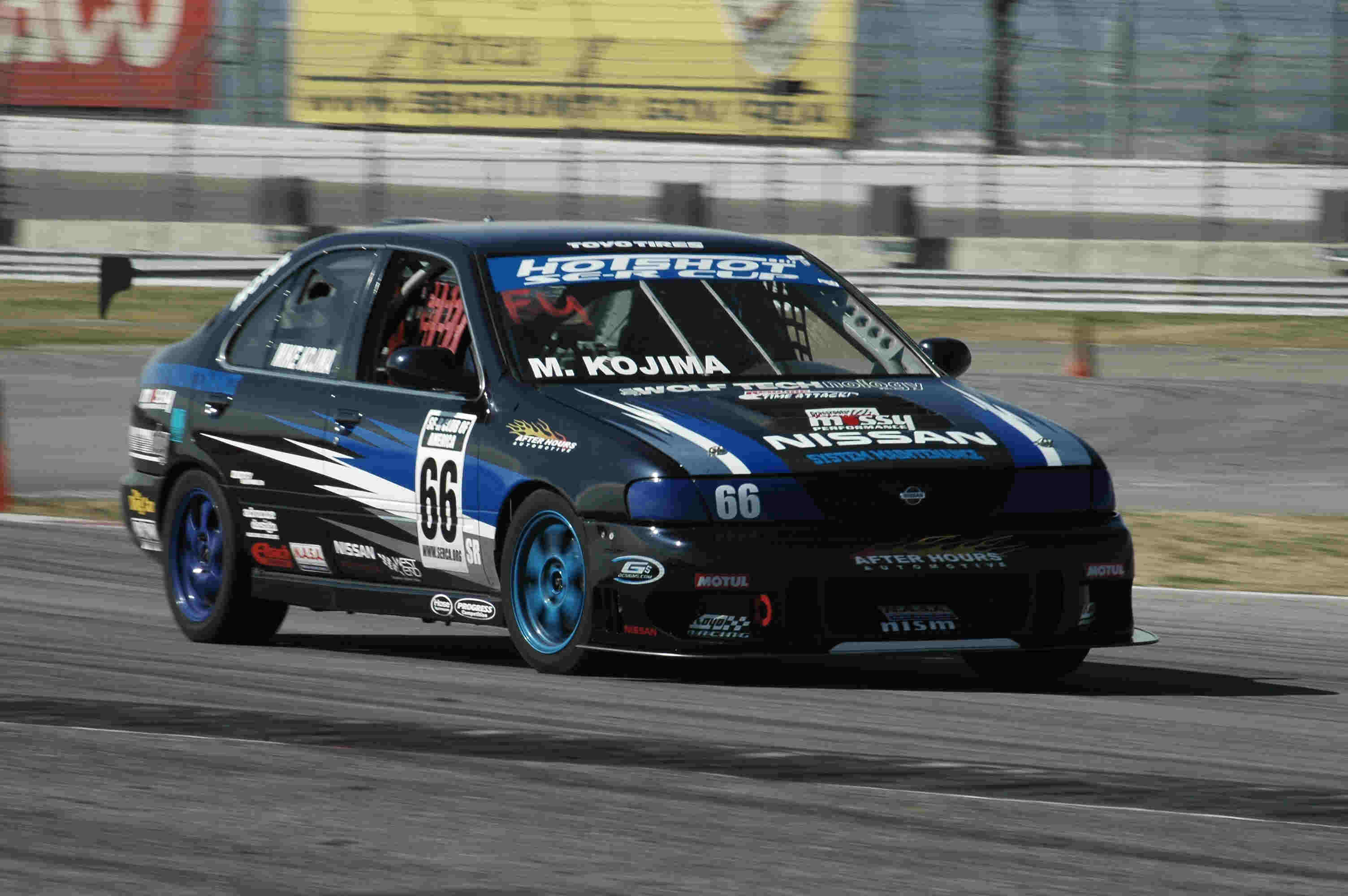
The Dog Car at Redline Time Attack

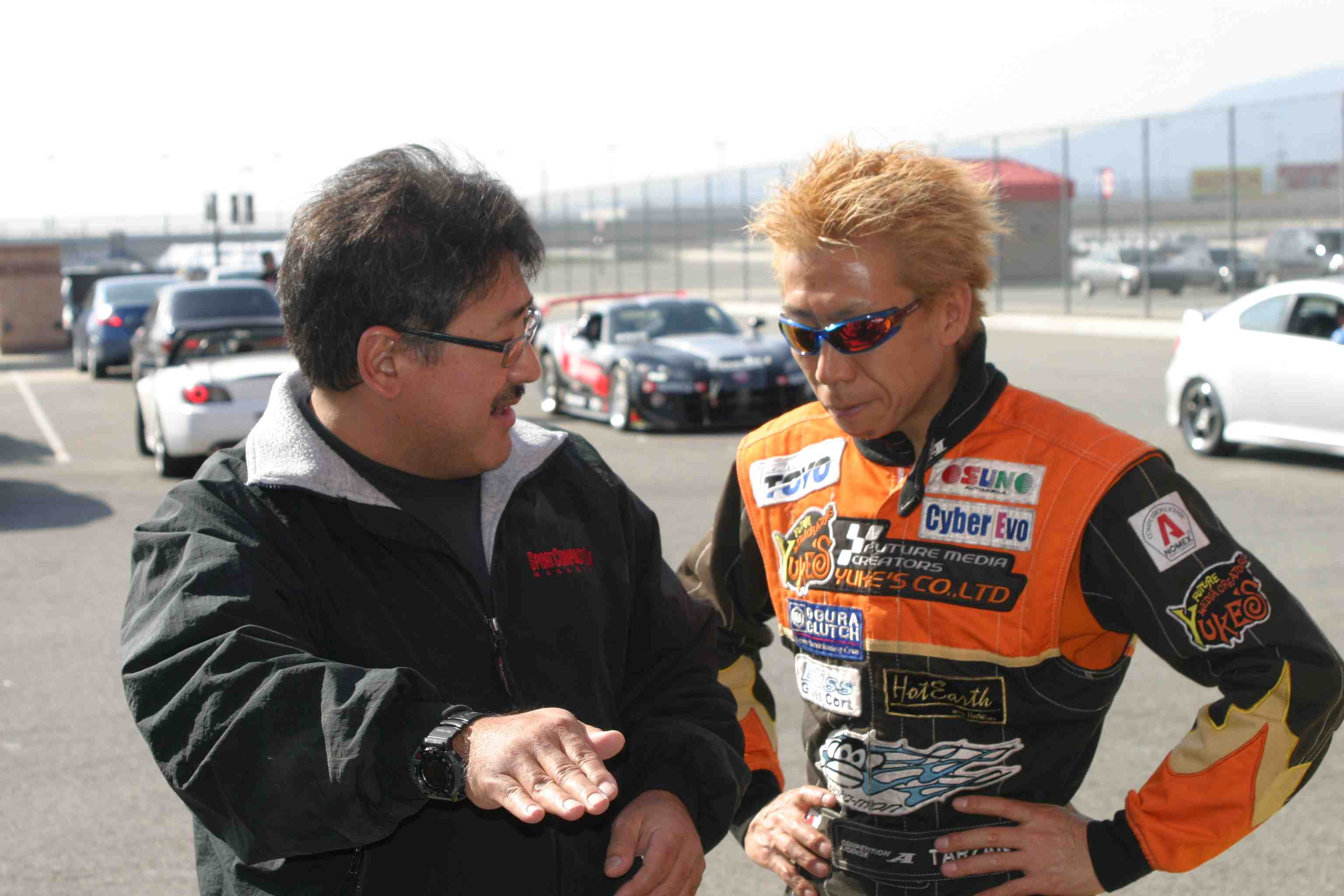
Mike Kojima and Tarzan Yamada discuss chassis set up
