= Otto Frank Graven =

- Nationality: South African (South Africa)
- Born: May 21, 1975 (age 51) Kimberley, Northern Cape, South Africa

Formula Drift
- Years active: 2005-2013

Otto Frank Graven (born May 25, 1975), is a professional driver from Kimberley, Northern Cape, South Africa, who has successfully competed in numerous motorsporting codes. He competed locally in the Botts Motorcycle series and later went on to establish himself as one of the countries top Drifters. In 2011, he was awarded a Pro Licence by one of the world's leading drift series in America. He competed in the Formula Drift season and managed to complete five out of the seven events as a rookie driver.

Graven plans to aid other local Raceway owners in introducing the American V8 Late Model Series which is popular in the United States and Australia. Currently he competes in Car No.27 at one of Cape Town's dirt oval tracks, and is busy restoring his own dirt oval track back home in Kimberley.

== History ==
This racing enthusiast grew up in the Northern Cape in South Africa and currently still resides in Kimberley with his family. Otto's first passion was motor bikes, which he raced for a few years up until he was introduced to drifting in 2005. He has an impressive collection of road bikes along with some Motards and go-karts which he still enjoys in his spare time. From 2008 onwards he made several trips to Japan to train with Ebisu Track owner and Team Orange driver, Nobushige Kumakubo. The experience secured him a spot in the D1 Street Legal competition, which made him the first South African to compete alongside the Japanese.

Back on home soil, Otto tackled the local drift series with technical precision and skill, bagging him two consecutive local drift series titles, two years in a row. In 2009, he set out to build the first ever drift circuit in South Africa, which can be used for Tar Oval Racing as well. Monstermob Raceway was previously known as the Kimberley showgrounds, today hosts various local events which include go-kart endurance races, Off-road, Quad bike, Spinning, Drifting, Oval, as well as local community backed events aimed at raising funds for local charities and non-profit organizations.

Formula Drift granted him a competition licence to compete in the 2011 season, where he successfully competed in five out of the seven events throughout the year as a rookie driver.

In January 2012, Graven was invited down to Tygerberg Raceway by local track owner to try his hand at an American V8 Late Model, Car No.27 is one of only 11 cars in South Africa at the moment, Otto purchased the car after his first race and to date still participates in the Late Model Series. In May, Graven and a few of the local South African drift promoters got together and created the Shakedown Series which hosted a number of successful events throughout the remaining season. Graven's focus was on training, he has expressed immense passion towards forming a South African drift team that can one day join him in the Formula Drift Series.

The 2013 drift season will see Graven partner up with DTA Posse founder, Johan Esbensen as they race under the Ultimate 86 Motorsports banner.

== Basic information ==
- Height – 6’ 2”
- Weight – 216
- Car Numbers – #113 (United States) #13 (South Africa)
- Base in U.S - Las Vegas, Nevada
- Team – Ultimate 86 Motorsport
- Team Mate - Johan 'Yo' Esbensen DTA Posse
- Crew Members – Johannes Marneweck, Tiaan Goosen, Shamendra Van Rooyen

== Sponsors ==
- Monstermob Car Specialist
- Graven Mining
- DTA Posse
- Mishimoto

== Achievements ==
- Motorcycle Racing Club (Botts) - 13/7/2002, Lichtenburg, 3rd
- Motorcycle Racing Club (Botts) - 19/02/2005, Midvaal, 3rd
- Bike SA MS2000 (Botts) - 23/04/2005, Phakisa, 2nd
- CMC (Botts) - 06/08/2005, Phakisa, 2nd
- Motorcycle Racing Club (Botts) - 03/09/2005, Midvaal, 2nd
- Motorcycle Racing Club (Botts) - 01/10/2005, Phakisa, 2nd
- Motorcycle Racing Club (Botts) – 2005 Club Championship, 2nd
- Elf Racing, 2005 Tri-Series, 3rd
- Beta Racing MS2000 (Botts) - 25/03/2006, Phakisa, 1st
- Beta Racing MS2000 (Botts) - 13/05/2006, Midvaal, 2nd
- Beta Racing MS2000 (Botts) - 16/09/2006, Phakisa, 3rd

== Drifting achievements ==
2009

- Won the 2009 NDS Drift Series (National Drift Series)
- Won the 2009 SADC Drift Series (Rock Raceway)

2010

- Won the 2010 NDS Drift Series (National Drift Series)
- Won the 2010 SADC Drift Series (Rock Raceway)
- Won the 2010 Carnival City Slidemasters (Rock Raceway)
- Won the 2010 SUPA Drift Series (Zwartkops Raceway)

2011
Formula Drift Series Rookie

2012
Shakedown Series South Africa
Tygerberg Raceway V8 Late Model Series

2013
Formula Drift Series

== See also ==
- 2011 Formula D season
