= Jeff Abbott (racing driver) =

American racing driver

- Born: Poughkeepsie, New York, U.S.
- Known for: Drifting; Formula D
- Website: http://jeffabbbottracing.com/

Jeff Abbott is a former Formula Drift competitor.

== Biography ==
Born and raised in Poughkeepsie, New York, Abbott moved out to Temecula, California to start his professional career, family, and began to take interest in the sport of drifting. He progressed through various grassroots motorsports programs in Southern California such as Just Drift, 626 Drift, and R.A.D. Experience. Abbott began driving in Formula D in 2010 driving a 1999 Mazda Miata but withdrew in 2011 after 2 seasons.

== Results ==
=== Formula D ===
Year	Entrant	Car	1	2	3	4	5	6	7	Position	Points
2010	Jeff Abbott Racing	Mazda Miata	Rd. 1.25/24	Rd. 2 x	Rd. 3 x	Rd. 4 x	Rd. 5.25/24	Rd. 6 x	Rd. 7; 0	44	48.50
2011	Jeff Abbott Racing	Mazda Miata	Rd. 1; 1/24	Rd. 2 x	Rd. 3 x	Rd. 4	Rd. 5	Rd. 6	Rd. 7	37	25
