= Heather Graven =

Atmospheric scientist

- Education: Scripps Institution of Oceanography California Institute of Technology
- Scientific career
- Workplaces: Imperial College London Scripps Institution of Oceanography ETH Zurich
- Thesis: Advancing the use of radiocarbon in studies of global and regional carbon cycling with high precision measurements of ^{14}C in CO_{2} from the Scripps CO_{2} Program (2008)

Heather Dawn Graven is a Professor of Climate Physics in the Atmospheric Physics group at Imperial College London. She creates mathematical models to predict how climate change will impact the carbon cycle.

== Education ==
Graven earned a bachelor's degree in chemical engineering from California Institute of Technology in 2001. She won the Dean's Cup for contributions to student life. She earned a PhD from the Scripps Institution of Oceanography in 2008. Her PhD thesis, Advancing the use of radiocarbon in studies of global and regional carbon cycling with high precision measurements of ^{14}C in CO_{2} from the Scripps CO_{2} Program, was assessed by Ralph Keeling.

== Career ==
Graven studies greenhouse gas emissions. In 2008 she joined ETH Zurich as a postdoctoral researcher. She returned to the Scripps Institution of Oceanography in 2011, researching variations in the amplitude of CO_{2} over the course of seasons. Since 2013, she has led the Carbon Cycle research group at Imperial College London.

Graven's research focuses on measuring atmospheric CO_{2} and CH_{4}. The emission of greenhouse gases from fossil fuels can compromise the effectiveness of radiocarbon dating. She is also interested in the global uptake and cycling of carbon by plants, soil and the ocean. Her team use numerical models to predict the impact of climate change on the global carbon cycle. She is the project lead on several NASA funded projects, quantifying fossil and biospheric CO_{2} fluxes in California.

She took part in the American Association for the Advancement of Science 2017 Annual Meeting, discussing Global Climate Science Imperatives. Graven contributes regularly to the discussion of climate change in the media.
