= Tony Angelo =

American drift racer and stunt driver

Tony Angelo
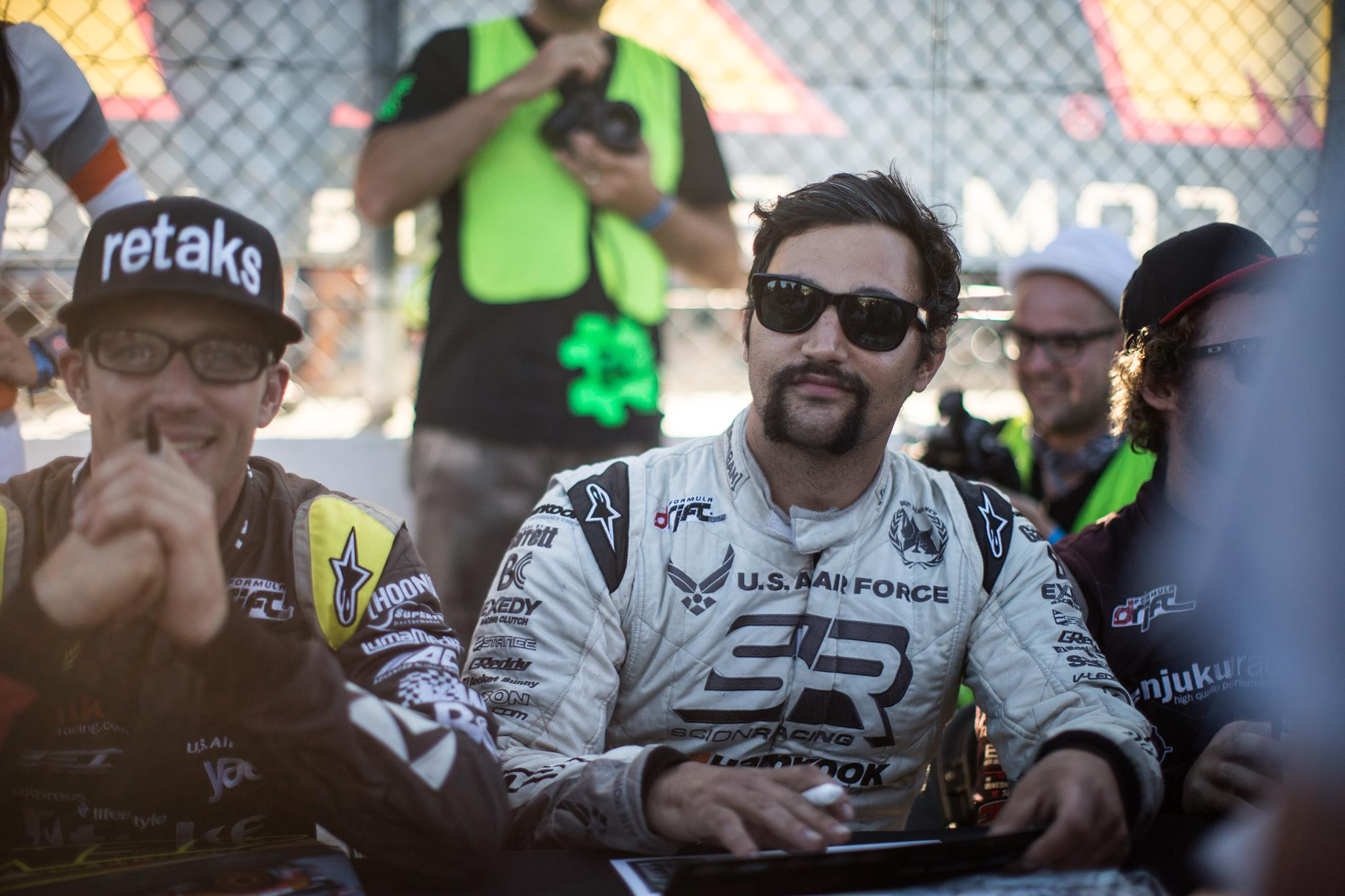
Tony Angelo at the autograph table during a Formula Drift event at Evergreen Speedway
Hometown:	Doylestown, Pennsylvania, U.S.
Series:	Formula D

Tony Angelo is an American professional drift racer and stunt driver. Angelo formerly drove in the Formula Drift series in his 2013 Scion FR-S for Scion Racing and is also the former host for Motor Trend Channel's Hot Rod Garage. He currently hosts his own YouTube Channel ‘Stay Tuned’ with 500k subscribers as of 10/18/2026.

== Career ==
Angelo began building and modifying his own cars as a teenager in his hometown of Doylestown, PA. In the late 90s, Angelo was inspired to start drifting by Japanese videos and magazines. He and friend and future pro-driver Chris Forsberg soon helped to start East Coast grassroots drifting events which quickly took off.

In 2003, Angelo personally gained national exposure in an article in Wired Magazine at the same time that drifting was gaining massive popularity. At this time doors began to open for Angelo to race in the pro series.

Angelo began racing professionally in 2004 in Formula Drift’s first year. He was quickly seen as a force on the track. In 2005, Angelo earned his D1 license by placing first in a national driver’s search.

After years in FD as a serious competitor, Angelo took a break from driving professionally in the U.S. in 2009 and became a judge for Formula Drift. Angelo is credited with having majorly changed FD judging and scoring format for the better during this time.

Angelo returned to the driver’s seat in 2012 for Scion Racing in his 2009 Scion tC.

In 2013, Angelo purchased a salvage Scion FR-S that had been damaged during Hurricane Sandy. In just ten weeks, he and his TAngelo Racing team transformed the car into his 750 hp racecar.

Angelo also does stunt work, having driven in ads for Audi, Nissan and Chevrolet.

Angelo is the founder and president of Drift Alliance, based out of Englishtown, New Jersey. He is also a member of the Blood Masters team. Angelo often drifts his Lexus SC 300 missile car at grassroots events alongside amateur drivers at the Englishtown track where his career started.

Angelo was a host on the Motor Trend show Hot Rod Garage, which he left after six seasons.

== Achievements ==
- President of Drift Alliance
- Multiple Formula Drift top 10 and top 8 finished
- 2013 FD Palm Beach Top 16
- 2013 FD Palm Beach Top FR-S qualifier
- 2013 Drift Week Triple Crown at Pikes Peak - 3rd Place
- 2012 FD Palm Beach Top Scion qualifier
- 2012 FD Palm Beach Top 4-cylinder qualifier
- 2012 Top 32 Qualifier all Formula Drift events
- 2010 FX Open Belarus - 5th Place
- 3 Formula Drift Team Drift wins
- 1st place D1 driver’s search
- Fastest qualifier record on fastest FD track, Evergreen Speedway
