= Justin Pawlak =

American race car driver

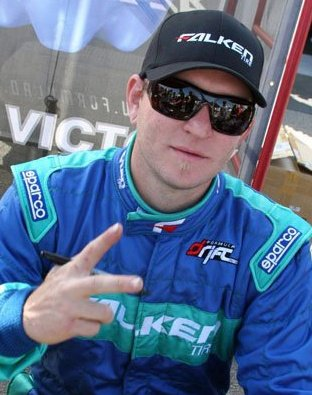
- Born: Justin Thomas Pawlak; September 13, 1979 (age 47); Kalamazoo, Michigan
- Occupations: Professional Drift Car Driver; Shop Owner (Hot Line Performance)
- Known for: Motor racing Formula D Drift Competitor (2008 - 2015) Television and Film; Ford's Octane Academy (JR episode)
- Height: 6 ft 0 in (183 cm)
- Website: http://justinpawlak.com/

Notes
- All stats current as of July 24, 2012.

Justin Thomas Pawlak, also known as JTP, is an American professional drifter who currently competes in the Formula D series. He earned his Formula D Professional license in 2006 and later earned his D1 license. In 2010, he was picked up Team Falken Tire and has been with them ever since. For the 2012 FD season, he drove the 2013 Falken Tire Ford Mustang RTR. Pawlak continues his support of local, grassroots drifting by judging the Just Drift Top Drift series alongside fellow Formula D drivers Taka Aono and Hiro Sumida.

== Quick Facts ==
=== Justin Thomas Pawlak ===
- Nickname - JTP
- Height – 6’ 0”
- Weight – 195 lbs
- Car Number – 13
- Hometown – Kalamazoo, MI
- Team – Falken Tire Motorsports
- Crew Members – Rick lamber, Sergio Ramirez, Chris Tuscow, Eric Ross, Dalton Folkert, Tim Folkert, Stan Williams

=== 2013 Falken Tire Ford Mustang Specs ===
- Tires – Falken Azenis RT-615K
- Engine – Ford Racing/Roush Yates engine
- Horsepower – 865 hp/632 ft lbs tq
- Suspension – RTS
- Brakes – Wilwood
- Wheels – HRE Performance Wheels Competition Series C106
- Exterior – Dry carbon panels
- Interior – Sparco safety equipment

=== Sponsors ===
- Falken Tires
- Ford Racing
- Roush Performance
- Mobil 1
- RTS
- HRE Performance Wheels
- Wilwood
- Mothers
- BC
- Battery Tender
- HPI Racing
- Sparco
- 3d carbon
- HPI Racing
- GoPro
- Falken Team
- PWR North America

== Cars Driven ==
- 2008 Season - Mazda RX-7 FC Turbo Rotary
- 2010–present - Falken Tire Ford Mustang

== Achievements ==
=== 2012 Finished 4th Overall (501 pts) ===
- Placed 1st at Formula Drift Round 1, Streets of Long Beach, CA (Qualified 4th)
- Placed 1st at Formula Drift Round 2, Road Atlanta Raceway, GA (Qualified 8th)
- Placed 4th at Formula Drift Round 3, Palm Beach International Raceway, FL
- Placed Top 8 at Formula Drift Round 4, The Wall, NJ (Qualified 14th)
- Placed Top 32 at Formula Drift Round 5, Evergreen Speedway, WA (Qualified 2nd)
- Placed Top 32 at Formula Drift Round 6, Las Vegas Motor Speedway, NV (Qualified 9th)
- Placed 2nd at Formula Drift Round 7, Irwindale Speedway, CA (Qualified 2nd)
- 2012 Triple Crown Champion

=== 2011 ===
- Placed 2nd overall in the Formula D series (522.25 points)
- Placed 1st at Formula Drift Round 1, Streets of Long Beach, CA
- Placed 1st at Formula Drift Round 3, Palm Beach International Raceway, FL
- Placed 2nd at Formula Drift Round 4, Wall Speedway, NJ

=== 2010 ===
- Placed 11th overall in the Formula D series (354.50 points)

=== 2009 ===
- Placed 9th overall in the Formula D series (416 points)

=== 2008 ===
- Formula D Championship - 16th Overall (197 pts)
- Placed Top 16 at Formula Drift Round 1, Streets of Long Beach, CA
- Placed Top 16 at Formula Drift Round 5, Evergreen Speedway, WA
- Placed 3rd at Formula Drift Round 7, Irwindale Speedway, CA
- Placed 1st at FD Monterrey Mexico Invitational

=== 2006 ===
- Placed 1st at JustDrift Top Drift Championship Series
