= Dai Yoshihara =

Japanese racing driver

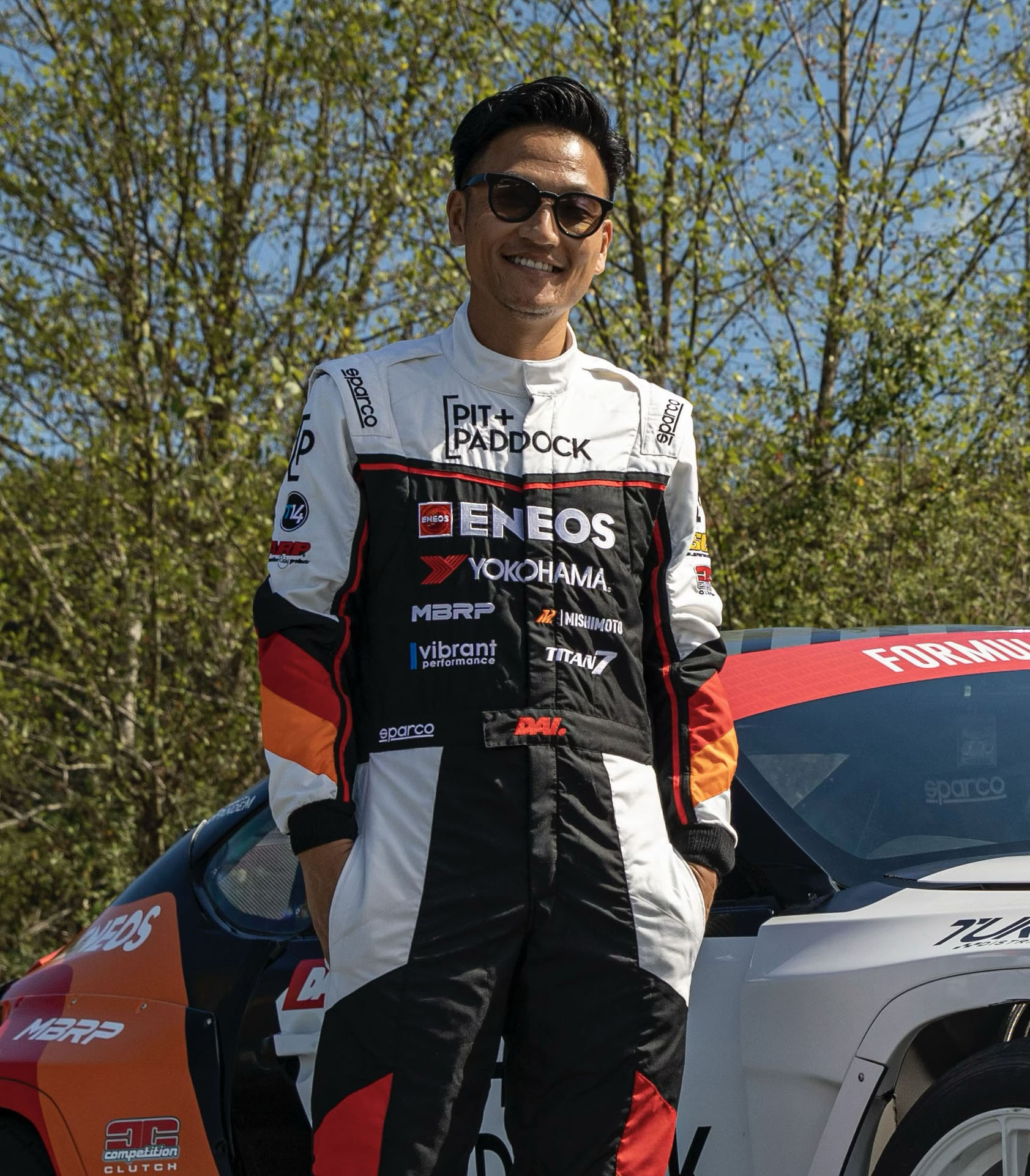
- Yoshihara in 2023
- Born: Daijiro Yoshihara; December 24, 1978 (age 47); Hachiōji, Tokyo, Japan
- Occupation: Professional drifter

Daijiro Yoshihara (吉原 大二郎, Yoshihara Daijiro) (born December 24, 1978) is a Japanese professional driver with experience in Drifting, Road Racing, Time Attack, and Hill Climb.

== Background ==
Before entering professional driving, Yoshihara enjoyed drifting but saw no real economic opportunity in the sport. Yoshihara instead worked at various companies including a car dealership, a telephone company, and a trucking service. However, in 2003, Yoshihara was offered a chance to compete in the 2003 D1 Grand Prix in its inaugural season in the United States, and accepted the offer, although he had never been prior or even competed in a drift competition. Yoshihara entered the D1 driving for Pacific Rim Motorsport in a Nissan Silvia (S13). Yoshihara was a rookie with no competition experience but qualified and finished in the top half out of 32 competitors. Yoshihara then competed in the Drift Showoff in Irwindale, California, and took a podium spot to finish second overall.

Yoshihara ended his maiden season of 2003 with multiple wins. As a result, he was entered into the 2004 Formula Drift Championship Series the following season. Yoshihara finished in the top-eght at two rounds and placed second at two of the rounds, placing him second overall in the championship run. Yoshihara earned the accolade of being the driver with the fastest entry speed every time he raced in the 2004 Formula Drift season. In 2005 and 2006, Yoshihara earned even more success in the Formula Drift series with multiple podium finishes, and in 2007 finished third overall. In 2008, Yoshihara entered with a factory-backed Pontiac GTO for RMR Racing, along with teammate Rhys Millen. Yoshihara ended the 2008 season with a podium finish and placed second overall during the Red Bull Drifting World Championship. Throughout the 2008 season, Yoshihara took podium twice and eventually finished fourth overall in the Formula D series.

The 2009 season saw Yoshihara signed to Falken Tire, driving a V8 powered Lexus IS350. Throughout the 2009 season, Yoshihara and his new team experienced developmental problems with the Lexus, eventually crashing and retiring it. Yoshihara finished off the season driving a team built Nissan 240SX. Yoshihara finished in 11th place for overall championship points.

In 2010, Yoshihara signed on for another season with Falken, continuing with the 2009 season's Nissan 240SX, which was now further modified, receiving a motor transplant and major suspension tuning. Yoshihara ended the 2010 drift season in fourth place in overall championship points.

Yoshihara continued to drive for Falken for 2011, with the same Nissan 240SX as he did in the 2009 and 2010 seasons; however, with more changes to the car, Yoshihara finished the 2011 season as Formula DRIFT champion and also won the Triple Crown award.

Yoshihara drove the Nissan 240SX through 2012 and 2013 where he finished seventh and 11th respectively. For the 2014 Formula Drift season, he switched to a 2014 Subaru BRZ.

For 2019, Yoshihara teamed with Evasive Motorsports to drive their Toyota 86 in Global Time Attack. In the final event of the season titled Super Lap Battle, he was able to lay down the fastest lap taking both the event and Unlimited RWD class win.

In 2020, Yoshihara drove the Evasive Motorsports Toyota 86 at the Pikes Peak International Hill Climb in Colorado Springs, Colorado in the Unlimited class. The vehicle had mechanical troubles and failed to qualify leading to a last position start on race day. Yoshihara, along with the crew of Evasive Motorsports persevered, and on race day, he was able to finish first in the Unlimited Class and ninth overall with a time of 10:05.006.

== Achievements ==
DRIFTING

Formula DRIFT Championship Series – 2004 to Present

- Drift Competitor

- 2004 Championship Points, 2nd Place Overall

- 2005 Championship Points, 5th Place Overall

- 2006 Championship Points, 5th Place Overall

- 2007 Championship Points, 3rd Place Overall

- 2008 Championship Points, 4th Place Overall

- 2009 Championship Points, 11th Place Overall

- 2010 Championship Points, 4th Place Overall

- 2011 Championship Points, 1st Overall

- 2011 Tires.com Triple Crown, 1st Overall

- 2012 Championship Points, 7th Overall

- 2013 Championship Points, 11th Overall

- 2014 Championship Points, 18th Overall

- 2015 Championship, 22nd Overall

- 2016 Championship, 6th Overall

- 2017 Championship, 6th Overall

- 2018 Championship, 10th Overall

- 2019 Championship, 9th Overall

- 2020 Championship, 12th Overall

Pro Drift Ireland - 2012

- 2nd Place, Round 5

D1 Grand Prix All Star Exhibition at Irwindale Speedway – 2005 & 2006

- Drift Competitor

- Best 16

D1 Grand Prix – 2004

- Drift Competitor

- Best 16

D1 Grand Prix Driver Search - 2003

- Drift Competitor

- U.S. Qualifier

D1 Grand Prix – 2003

- Drift Competitor

- Best 16

Drift Showoff at Irwindale Speedway – 2003

- Drift Competitor

- Podium, 2nd place

DRIFTING JUDGE

Professional Asia Drift Series Judge – 2009 to Present

- Formula DRIFT Asia: Malaysia, Singapore, Thailand

- Good Year International Drift Series: Thailand

- Red Bull Car Park Drift 2014: Dubai, UAE

DRIFTING INSTRUCTOR

International Drifting Academy – 2011

- Drift Driving Instructor

TIME ATTACK / ROAD RACE

Pikes Peak International Hill Climb

- 2020 1st Place in Unlimited Class

Lamborghini Super Trofeo

- 2019 Super Trofeo Asia series - LC Cup 2nd Overall

- 2018 World Final - LC Cup 2nd place in Race 2 5th Place

25 Hours of Thunderhill - 2013

- 3rd Place, E3 Class

Super Taikyu

- 2015 Rd.3 ST4 class competitor

MotoIQ Pacific Tuner Car Championship – 2011

- Competitor

- Podium, 1st Place, 2011

Global Time Attack - Super Lap Battle

- 2019 1st Overall, 1st in Unlimited RWD class

- 2018 3rd in Limited FWD Class

- 2017 3rd in Unlimited FWD Class

- 2016 3rd in Unlimited FWD Class

- 2015 1st in Unlimited FWD Class (new FWD Course Record)

- 2014 1st in Unlimited FWD Class

- 2010 1st Street RWD Class

- 2006 1st in Drift Class

GYMKHANA

Gymkhana Grid

- 1st Place, 2010

Magazine, Commercial & TV Stunt

== TV career ==
Yoshihara has starred as himself in the reality/documentary web series Behind the Smoke, along with Yoshihara's crew members Scott Dodgion of SPD Metal Works, Mike Kojima of MotoIQ and Chris Marion of KW Suspension. Behind the Smoke is produced by GTChannel in association with Discount Tire, first released in April 2011. The show follows Yoshihara throughout his championship-winning 2011 Formula D season both on and off the track. The first season of BTS documented his 2011 Formula D championship season. In 2012, the show won a Bronze Telly Award for Online Video Reality Show. Behind the Smoke is produced and directed by Taro Koki of GTChannel which also represents Best Motoring and Hot Version internationally.
