= Taka Aono =

Japanese drift driver

Taka Aono is a Japanese drift driver currently (as of February 2009) competing in the American Formula D series in his Toyota Sprinter AE86 Trueno. Before his professional drifting career began, Taka was a successful autocross driver, and was instrumental in building southern California's drift scene. Aono was previously sponsored by Falken Tires, however he has since lost his sponsorship deal due to an unsuccessful season in 2008. Aono is also known to have given up a career as a chiropractor to become a drift driver.

Aono is now sponsored by Nexen Tire and Megan Racing.

== Other Activities ==
Aono participated in Project Car Tuner Magazine's Toyota Corolla Drift Project, contributing time, expertise, and parts.
