= G65 =

G65 may refer to:

- Mercedes-AMG G65 AMG
- ORP Piorun (G65)
- G65 Baotou–Maoming Expressway
- Grumman G-65 Tadpole
