= Mercedes-AMG G 63 6x6 =

Full-size pickup truck

Mercedes-AMG G63 6x6
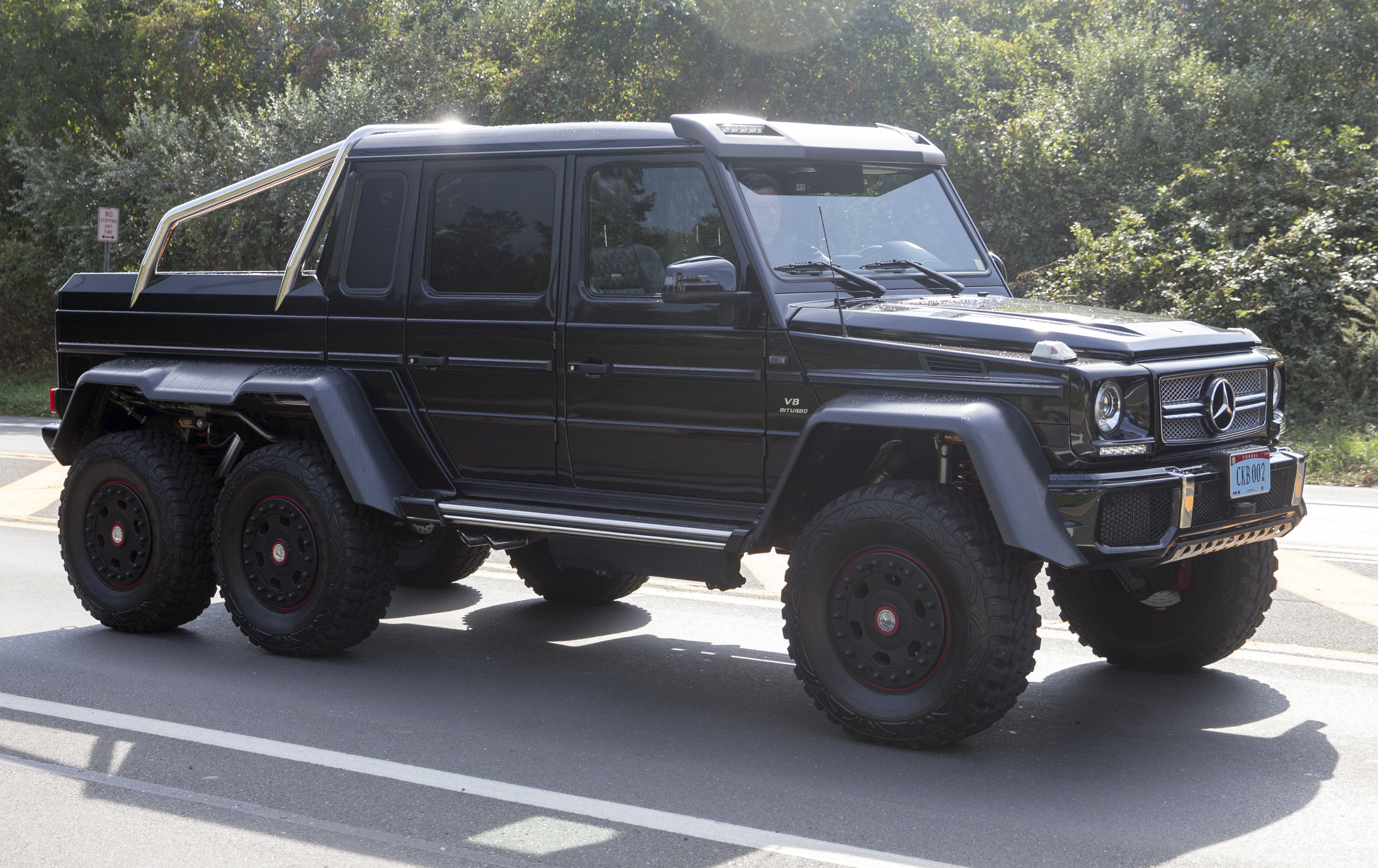

Overview
- Manufacturer: Mercedes-Benz
- Production: 2013–2015
- Assembly: Austria: Graz (Magna Steyr)

Body and chassis
- Class: Full-size pickup truck
- Body style: 4-door pickup
- Layout: Front-engine, six-wheel-drive

Powertrain
- Engine: 5.5 L M157 twin-turbo V8
- Transmission: 7-speed automatic

Dimensions
- Length: 5,875 mm (231.3 in)
- Width: 2,110 mm (83.1 in)
- Height: 2,210 mm (87.0 in)
- Kerb weight: 4,083 kg (9,001 lb)

The Mercedes-AMG G 63 6x6, or Mercedes-Benz G 63 AMG 6x6, is a sport utility truck (SUT) manufactured by Mercedes-AMG. An SUT derivative of the six wheel drive Mercedes Geländewagen developed for the Australian Army from 2007 (see G-Class Military operators), at the time it was the company's largest offroad vehicle and second most expensive street-legal model after only the SLS AMG Electric Drive. It was manufactured from 2013 to 2015 by Magna Steyr in Graz, Austria.

It combines the engine from the G63, a twin-turbo V8, with 6x6 portal axles, a pick-up version of the G-Class body, and a luxury interior. It was produced from 2013 to 2015, with production exceeding 100 vehicles.

The G63 AMG 6x6 features six-wheel drive and uses Mercedes-AMG's 5.5-liter M157 twin-turbo V8. It has a power output of 543 PS (399 kW; 536 hp) and 561 lb⋅ft (761 N⋅m) of torque. The G63 AMG 6x6 is fitted with Mercedes' 7G-tronic seven-speed automatic transmission; its transfer case can alter between a 0.87:1 high-range ratio for on-road driving and 2.16:1 low-range ratio for off-road conditions to all six wheels in a nominal 30:40:30 split. An extra shaft delivers power to the rearmost axle. The vehicle has five electronic differential locks, which can deliver 100% lockup of all six wheels, operated by three switches on the dashboard.

The G63 AMG 6x6 is 5,875 mm (231.3 in) long, 2,110 mm (83.1 in) wide, and 2,210 mm (87.0 in) tall, with 460 mm (18.1 in) of ground clearance and a fording depth of 1,000 mm (39.4 in). It has portal axles, similar to those fitted on Unimog vehicles. The vehicle is fitted with 18 in (457 mm) beadlock wheels and 37 in (940 mm) tires, has a 4,196 mm (165.2 in) wheelbase (front axle to rearmost axle), and weighs 4,083 kg (9,001 lb). The G63 AMG 6x6 can deliver 0–60 mph (97 km/h) in 7.8 seconds with a top speed limited to 100 mph (161 km/h).

== Overview ==
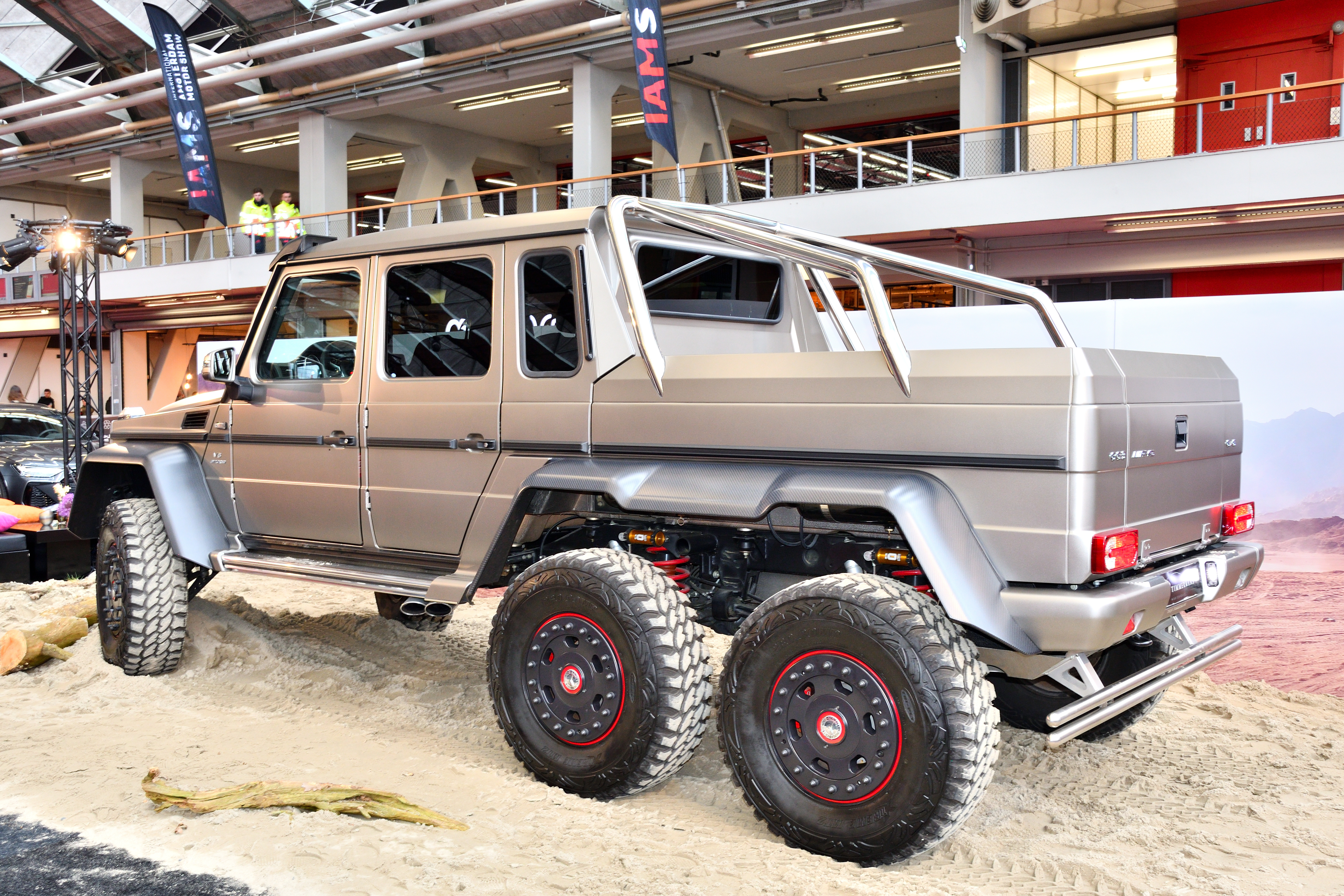
At the Amsterdam Motor Show 2023

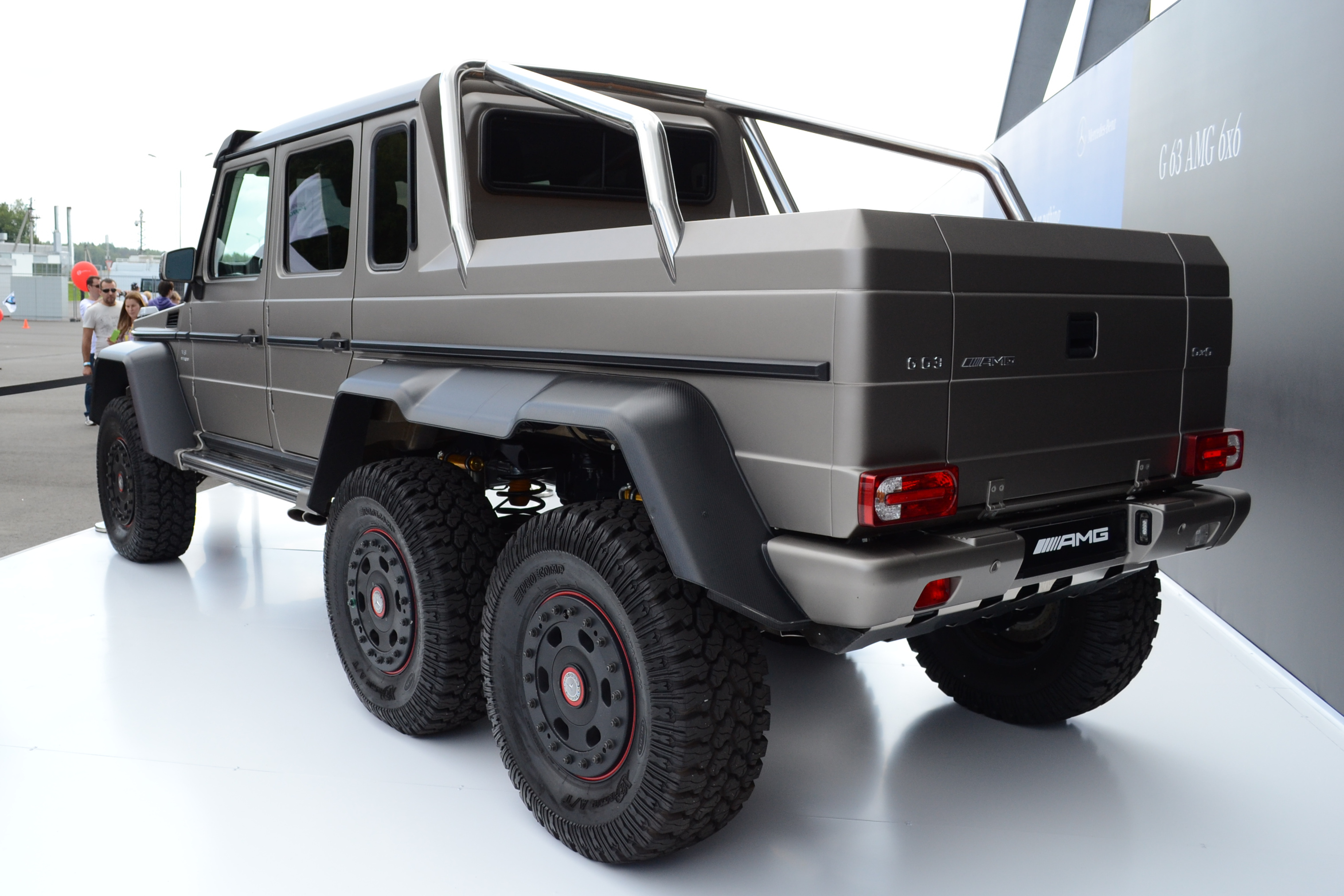
Twin rear axles on the G 63 AMG 6x6

Comparison between normal and portal axles. The G 63 AMG 6x6 has portal axles, boosting ground clearance over a traditional axle in an equivalent setup.

The G63 AMG 6x6 features an air compressor that allows it to reduce or increase tyre pressure in order to adapt the traction to the driving surface, especially in desert-like environments. The compressor fills four containers with 20 litres of air each to allow fast inflation of the tyres. This makes it possible to change from a level of inflation appropriate for sandy deserts to one appropriate for regular streets in less than twenty seconds.

The G63 AMG 6x6 was launched in early 2013. The company decided to stop sales of the car and declared the model completely sold out in early 2015 to maintain the model's exclusivity. Mercedes-Benz sold more units of the G63 AMG 6×6 than originally anticipated. The last customer delivery of the G63 AMG 6x6 left the G-Class factory in Graz, Austria, in May 2015.

In 2015, Mercedes-Benz introduced a RHD version of the G63 6x6, limited to 15 units, for the Malaysian market. They were bought by Naza World, one of the largest automotive conglomerates company in Malaysia. They were priced at RM3.2 million.

A wealthy South African businessman wanted to purchase a 6x6, but the company was willing to fulfil the request to convert it to right hand drive only if he had a larger order. The buyer therefore ordered 10 units, which were converted to RHD and brought into South Africa.

== In popular culture ==
The vehicle appears in the 2014 film Beyond the Reach, and Jurassic World in 2015. The appearance in Jurassic World, which was widely seen as a blockbuster, caused notice in the press, which likened it to the debut of the M-Class in 1997's The Lost World: Jurassic Park.

== See also ==
- Mercedes-Benz W31
- Mercedes-AMG G 65 (G-Class AMG version (4x4 regular axle))
- Mercedes-Benz G500 4×4² (Later MB model also with portal axles)
