= New York International Auto Show =

Annual US auto show

Coordinates: 40°45′28″N 74°0′9″W

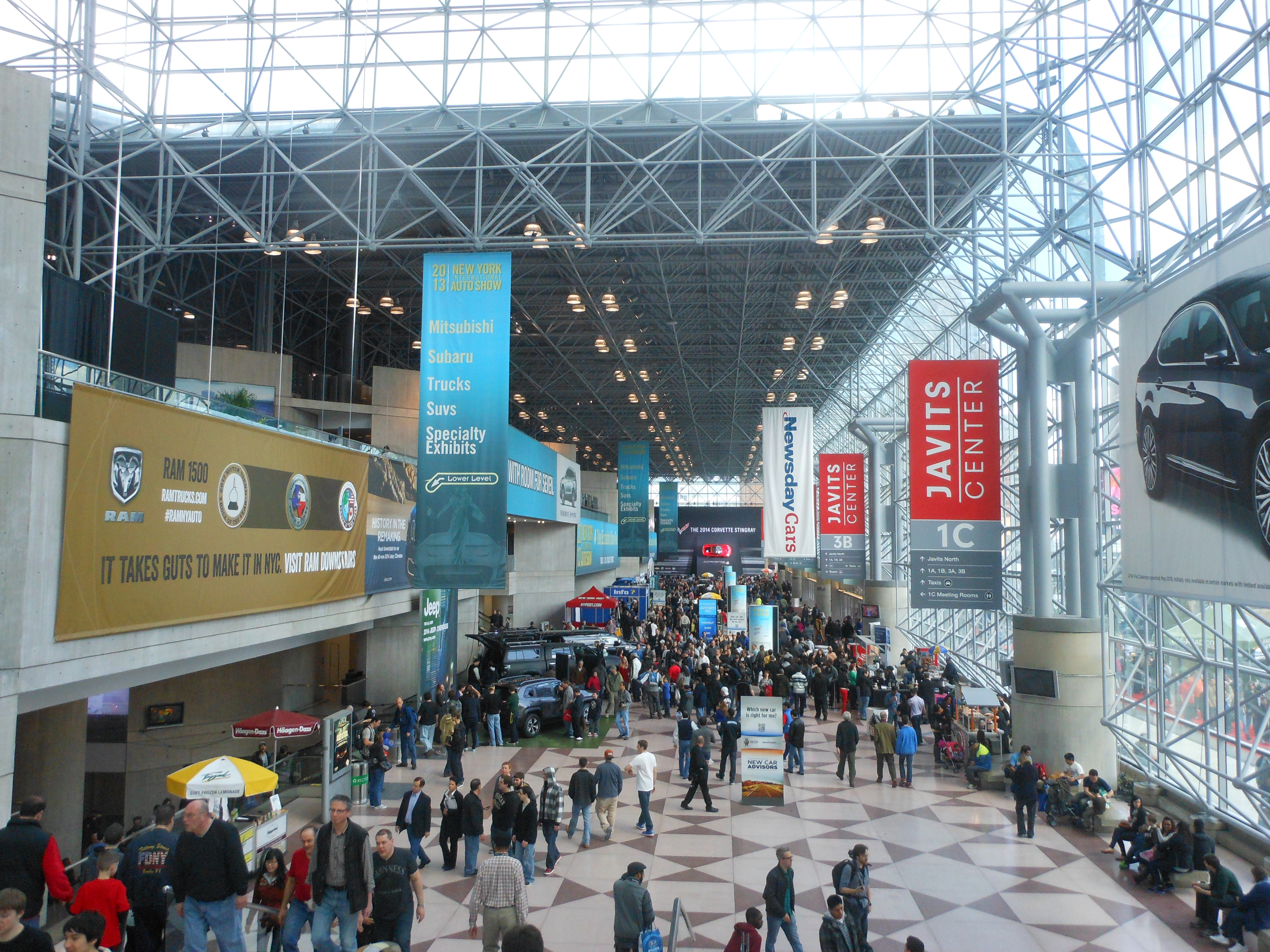
- The 2013 New York International Auto Show
- Status: Active
- Genre: Auto show
- Frequency: Annually
- Venue: Javits Center
- Locations: New York City, New York, U.S.
- Country: U.S.
- Years active: 1900–present
- Participants: 34 auto makers, 100+ other exhibitors (2018)
- Attendance: More than 1 million
- Capacity: 950,000 square feet
- Organiser: Greater New York Automobile Dealers Association
- Website: www.autoshowny.com

The New York International Auto Show is an annual auto show that is held in Manhattan, New York City in late March or early April. It is held at the Jacob Javits Convention Center. It usually opens on or just before Easter weekend and closes on the first Sunday after Easter.

The show has been held annually since 1900. It was the first automotive exhibition in North America.

The show was held at the New York Coliseum from 1956 to 1987 when the show moved to the Javits Center.

Before the show opens every year, several auto companies debut new production and concept vehicles for the press. In addition, the Greater New York Auto Dealers Association (GNYADA) and the International Motor Press Association (IMPA) host corporate meetings and events. The World Car Awards typically announces its annual award winners as part of these events.

In addition to individual programs during the show, there are automobile related conferences, forums, symposiums, and other gatherings. The ten day event contribution to economy of the City and State is estimated to be in the hundreds of millions of dollars.

== 2026 ==
The 2026 show was held from April 3–12, with press preview days on April 1 and 2.

=== Production car introductions ===
==== World debuts ====
- 2027 Chrysler Pacifica (refresh)
- 2026 Dodge Durango America250 special edition
- 2027 Ford Bronco RTR (auto show debut)
- 2027 Genesis GV70 Prestige Graphite
- 2027 Infiniti QX65
- 2027 Ram ProMaster City (auto show debut)
- 2027 Subaru Forester Wilderness Hybrid
- 2027 Subaru Getaway
- 2027 Volkswagen Atlas

==== North American debuts ====
- 2027 Kia EV3
- 2027 Kia Seltos
- 2027 Nissan Z (refresh)

=== Concept car introductions ===
- Hyundai Boulder
- Kia PV5 WAV New York Taxi concept

== 2025 ==
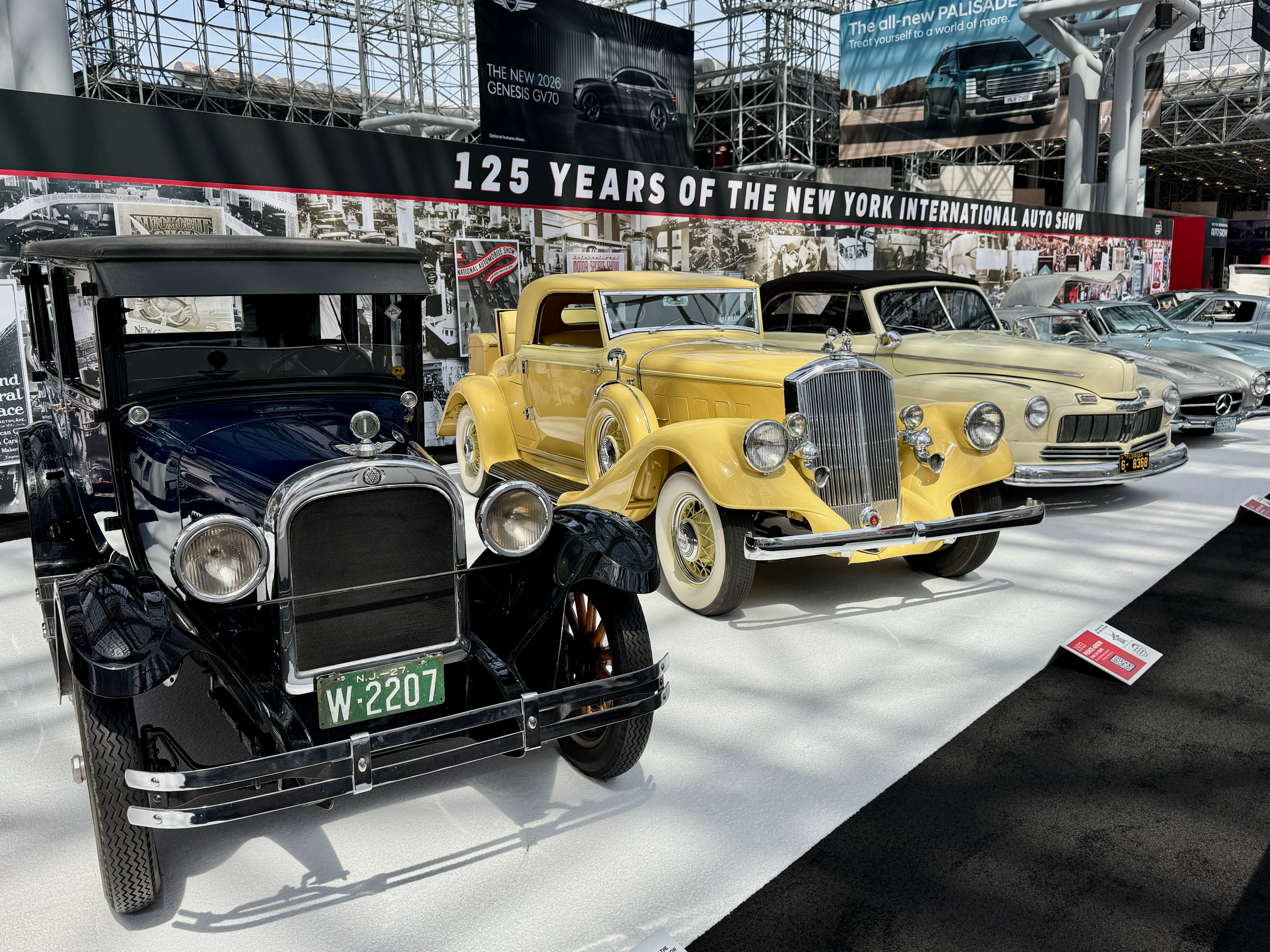
Some of the retro cars at NYIAS 2025

The 2025 show was held from April 18–27, with press preview days on April 16 and 17.

=== Production car introductions ===
==== World debuts ====
- 2025 Jeep Wagoneer Overland Special Edition
- 2026 Kia EV9 Nightfall Edition
- 2026 Subaru Outback
- 2026 Subaru Solterra (refresh)
- 2026 Subaru Trailseeker
- 2026 Toyota GR86 Yuzu Special Edition (auto show debut)
- 2026 Toyota GR Supra MkV Final Edition (auto show debut)
- 2026 Volkswagen Tiguan R-Line Turbo

==== North American debuts ====
- 2026 Hyundai Palisade
- 2026 Kia EV4
- 2026 Kia K4 Hatchback

=== Concept car introductions ===
- Genesis X Gran Equator

== 2024 ==
The 2024 show was held from March 29–April 7, with press preview days on March 27 and 28.

=== Production car introductions ===
==== World debuts ====
- 2025 Hyundai Santa Cruz (refresh)
- 2025 Infiniti QX80 (auto show debut)
- 2025 Kia K4
- 2025 Nissan Kicks (auto show debut)
- Porsche Macan EV (auto show debut)

==== North American debuts ====
- 2025 Hyundai Tucson (refresh)
- 2025 Mini Cooper S
- 2025 Polestar 4

=== Concept car introductions ===
- Genesis GV60, G80 Magma concepts
- Genesis Neolun

== 2023 ==
The 2023 show was held from April 7–16, with press preview days on April 5 and 6.

=== Production car introductions ===
==== World debuts ====
- 2024 Jeep Wrangler (refresh)
- 2025 Ram 1500 REV
- 2024 Subaru Crosstrek Wilderness
- 2024 Volkswagen Atlas Peak Edition

==== North American debuts ====
- 2024 Hyundai Kona
- 2024 Kia EV9

=== Concept car introductions ===
- Genesis GV80 Coupe concept
- Hyundai Ioniq 5 Disney100 Platinum Concept

== 2022 ==
The 2022 show was held from April 15–24, with press preview days on April 13 and 14. This year marked the first time the auto show contained micromobility exhibits.

=== Production car introductions ===
==== World debuts ====
- 2022 Ford GT Holman Moody Heritage Edition
- 2023 Hyundai Palisade (refresh)
- 2022 Jeep Grand Cherokee High Altitude 4xe
- 2023 (Jeep) Wagoneer L, Grand Wagoneer L
- 2023 Kia Telluride (refresh)
- 2023 Nissan Leaf (refresh)
- 2023 Nissan Pathfinder Rock Creek
- 2023 Subaru Outback (refresh)
- VinFast VF 7, VF 8, VF 9 (auto show debuts)
- Volkswagen ID. Buzz (Euro-spec, auto show debut)

==== North American debuts ====
- 2023 Kia Niro

=== Concept car introductions ===
- Chrysler Airflow Granite Concept
- Indi One

== 2021 ==
The 2021 show was scheduled to take place from August 20–29, 2021. However, it was again canceled, due to the COVID-19 Delta variant.

== 2020 ==
The 2020 show was previously scheduled to be held from August 28 through September 6, with press preview days on August 26 and 27. It was originally scheduled for April 10 through 19, but on March 10, it was postponed to late August due to the COVID-19 pandemic. Planned introductions included the production Lucid Air and a hydrogen-powered supercar from newcomer Hyperion Motors the Hyperion XP-1.

On May 22, 2020, the organizers announced that the 2020 show would be canceled due to the Convention Center continuing to be used as an active makeshift hospital, with the Center being on standby for the foreseeable future. They also announced that the organizers would focus on the 2021 show instead.

== 2019 ==
The 2019 show was held from April 19 through April 28, with press preview days on April 17 and 18.

=== Production car introductions ===
==== World debuts ====
- 2020 Acura TLX PMC Edition
- 2020 Cadillac CT5
- 2019 Dodge Challenger, Charger Stars & Stripes Edition
- 2019 Fiat 124 Spider Urbana Edition
- 2020 Ford Escape
- 2020 Ford Mustang Ecoboost High Performance Package
- 2020 Hyundai Venue
- 2019 Infiniti Q50 Signature Edition
- 2019 Kia Stinger GTS
- 2020 Lincoln Corsair
- 2020 Mercedes-AMG A 35 Sedan
- 2020 Mercedes-AMG CLA 35
- 2020 Mercedes-AMG GLC 63 (refresh)
- 2020 Mercedes-Benz EQC Edition 1886
- 2020 Mercedes-Benz GLC-Class Coupe (refresh)
- 2020 Mercedes-Benz GLS-Class
- 2020 Nissan 370Z, GT-R 50th Anniversary Edition
- 2020 Nissan Versa
- 2019 Porsche 911 (991) Speedster
- 2019 Ram 2500HD/3500HD Kentucky Derby Edition
- 2020 Subaru Outback
- 2020 Toyota Highlander
- 2020 Toyota Yaris Hatchback

==== North American debuts ====
- 2019 Alfa Romeo Giulia, Stelvio NRING
- 2019 Audi Q3
- 2020 Audi R8 (refresh), R8 V10 Decennium
- 2019 Audi TT RS (refresh)
- 2020 Bugatti Chiron Sport "110 Ans Bugatti"
- 2020 Hyundai Sonata
- 2020 Jaguar XE (refresh)
- 2020 Koenigsegg Jesko
- 2019 Mazda CX-5 Signature AWD Diesel
- Qiantu K50 EV (by Mullen)
- 2020 Range Rover Velar SVAutobiography

=== Concept car introductions ===
==== World debuts ====
- Genesis Mint
- Kia Habaniro
- Volkswagen Atlas Basecamp Concept

==== North American debuts ====
- Volkswagen ID Buggy
- Volkswagen Tarok concept

== 2018 ==
The 2018 show was held from March 30 through April 8, with press preview days on March 28 and 29.

=== Production car introductions ===
==== World debuts ====
- 2019 Acura MDX A-Spec
- 2019 Acura RDX (production version)
- 2018 Alfa Romeo Giulia, Stelvio Nero Edizione
- 2019 Audi RS5 Sportback
- 2019 Cadillac CT6 (refresh)
- 2019 Cadillac XT4
- 2018 Fiat 500 Urbana Edition
- 2019 Ford Fusion (refresh)
- 2019 GMC Acadia, Terrain Black Editions
- 2019 GMC Sierra AT4
- 2019 Honda Insight (production version)
- 2019 Hyundai Tucson (refresh)
- 2019 Infiniti QX60, QX80 Limited
- 2019 Jaguar F-Pace SVR
- 2019 Kia K900
- 2019 Kia Sedona (refresh)
- 2019 Maserati Levante Trofeo
- 2019 Mazda CX-3 (refresh)
- 2019 Mercedes-AMG C43 Coupe, Cabriolet (refresh)
- 2019 Mercedes-AMG C63, C63 S (refresh)
- 2019 Mercedes-Benz C-Class Coupe, Cabriolet (refresh)
- 2019 Nissan Altima
- 2019 Subaru Forester
- 2019 Toyota RAV4
- 2019 Toyota Yaris Sedan (refresh)

==== North American debuts ====
- 2019 Audi A6
- 2019 Audi R8 Rear-Wheel-Series
- 2019 BMW X4
- 2019 Bugatti Chiron Sport
- 2019 Genesis G70
- 2019 Hyundai Kona Electric
- 2019 Hyundai Santa Fe
- 2019 Jaguar I-Pace
- 2019 Kia Optima (refresh)
- 2019 Land Rover Range Rover SV Coupe
- 2019 Lamborghini Huracan Performante Spyder
- 2019 Lexus RC F Sport Black Line
- 2019 Lexus UX
- 2019 Mercedes-AMG G63
- 2019 Mercedes-AMG GT 4-Door
- 2019 Porsche 911 GT3RS (refresh)
- 2019 Rimac C Two
- 2019 Toyota Corolla Hatchback
- 2019 Volkswagen Arteon R-Line package
- 2019 Volvo V60
- 2019 Volvo XC40 Inscription

=== Concept car introductions ===
==== World debuts ====
- Genesis Essentia
- Lincoln Aviator (production preview)
- Mini Cooper S E Countryman Panamericana ALL4
- Mini Electric Classic Cooper
- Volkswagen Atlas Cross Sport concept
- Volkswagen Atlas Tanoak truck concept

==== North American debuts ====
- Mazda Kai
- Mini John Cooper Works GP Concept

== 2017 ==
The 2017 show was held from April 14 through April 23, with press preview days on April 12 and 13.

=== Production car introductions ===
==== World debuts ====
- 2018 Acura TLX (refresh)
- 2018 Audi R8 Audi Sport special edition
- 2018 Buick Enclave
- 2018 Buick Regal
- 2018 Chevrolet Corvette Carbon 65 Edition
- 2018 Chevrolet Tahoe, Suburban RST
- 2018 Dodge Challenger SRT Demon
- 2018 Ford Explorer (refresh)
- 2018 Ford Fusion Police Responder Hybrid Sedan
- 2017 Honda Civic Si (production-spec)
- 2018 Honda Clarity PHEV and EV
- 2018 Jeep Grand Cherokee TrackHawk
- 2017 Jeep Wrangler Chief, Smokey Mountain special editions
- 2018 Koenigsegg Agera RS1
- 2018 Lexus LS 500 F Sport
- 2018 Lincoln Navigator
- 2018 Maserati Ghibli Nerissimo
- 2018 Mercedes-AMG GLC63, GLC63 Coupe, GLC63 S Coupe
- 2018 Mitsubishi Outlander Sport (refresh)
- 2018 Nissan 370Z Heritage Edition
- 2017 Ram 1500 Sublime Sport, Rebel Blue Streak
- 2018 Subaru Outback (refresh)
- 2018 Toyota Sienna (refresh)

==== North American debuts ====
- 2018 Alfa Romeo Stelvio (base model, Ti)
- 2018 Audi RS 3 (sedan)
- 2018 Audi RS 5 (coupe)
- 2018 Audi TT RS
- 2017 BMW 4-Series (refresh)
- 2017 Honda Civic Type R
- 2018 Hyundai Sonata (refresh)
- 2018 Infiniti Q50 (refresh)
- 2018 Jaguar F-Type (refresh)
- 2018 Kia Rio
- 2018 Lamborghini Huracán Performante
- 2018 Maserati GranTurismo Sport Special Edition
- 2018 Mercedes-AMG E63 Wagon
- 2018 Mercedes-Benz E-Class Cabriolet
- 2017 Nissan GT-R Track Edition
- 2018 Porsche 911 GT3, GTS (refresh)
- 2018 Porsche Panamera Sport Turismo, Turbo S E-Hybrid
- 2018 Range Rover Velar
- 2019 Spyker C8 Preliator Spyder
- 2018 Subaru XV/Crosstrek
- 2018 Toyota Yaris (refresh)
- 2018 Volkswagen Golf GTI, Wagon, Alltrack, R (refresh)
- 2018 Volvo S90, S90L T8 PHEV
- 2018 Volvo XC60

=== Concept car introductions ===
==== World debuts ====
- Genesis GV80 Fuel Cell Concept
- Infiniti QX80 Monograph
- Nissan GT-R Copzilla
- Nissan Rogue Dogue Project Vehicle
- Nissan Rogue Trail Warrior Project
- Subaru Ascent SUV Concept
- Toyota FT-4X

==== North American debuts ====
- Mercedes-AMG GT Concept

=== Race car introductions ===
- Audi R8 LMS GT4

== 2016 ==
The 2016 show was held from March 25 through April 3, with press preview days on March 23 and 24.

=== Production car introductions ===
==== World debuts ====
- 2017 Acura MDX (refresh)
- 2017 Audi R8 Spyder
- 2017 Buick Enclave Sport Touring Edition
- 2017 Buick Encore (refresh)
- 2017 Chevrolet Camaro ZL1
- 2017 Chevrolet Sonic (refresh)
- 2017 Chrysler 300S w/ Sport Appearance Packages
- 2016 Ford Shelby Mustang GT-H
- 2017 GMC Terrain Nightfall Edition
- 2017 Infiniti QX70 Limited
- 2017 Jeep Grand Cherokee Summit (refresh)
- 2017 Jeep Grand Cherokee Trailhawk
- 2017 Mazda MX-5 RF
- 2017 Mercedes-AMG C63 Cabriolet
- 2017 Mercedes-AMG E43
- 2017 Mercedes-AMG GLC43, GLC43 Coupe
- 2017 Mercedes-Benz CLA-Class (refresh)
- 2017 Mercedes-Benz GLC Coupe
- 2017 Mini Clubman ALL4
- 2017 Mini John Cooper Works Convertible
- 2017 Nissan GT-R (refresh)
- 2017 Nissan Titan
- 2016 Scion tC RS 10.0 (Barcelona Red)
- 2017 Subaru Impreza
- 2017 Toyota 86 (refresh of Scion FR-S)
- 2017 Toyota Corolla 50th Anniversary Special Edition
- 2017 Toyota Highlander (refresh)
- 2017 Toyota Prius Prime (PHEV)

==== North American debuts ====
- 2017 Alfa Romeo Giulia, Giulia Ti
- 2017 BMW Alpina B7 xDrive
- 2017 BMW M760i xDrive
- 2017 BMW 330e iPerformance
- 2017 Fiat 124 Spider Elaborazione Abarth
- 2017 Honda Clarity FCV (US spec)
- 2017 Hyundai Ioniq Hybrid, Plug-in, Electric
- 2017 Jaguar F-Type SVR
- 2017 Kia Cadenza
- 2017 Koenigsegg Regera
- 2018 Lexus LC500h
- 2017 Maserati Levante
- 2017 Mitsubishi Mirage G4 Sedan
- 2017 Mitsubishi Outlander PHEV
- 2017 Porsche 718 Boxster
- 2017 Porsche 911 R
- 2017 Porsche Macan (I4 turbo)
- 2017 Rolls-Royce Ghost and Wraith Black Badge
- 2017 Spyker C8 Preliator
- 2017 Volkswagen Golf Alltrack
- 2017 Volvo XC90 Excellence (US debut)

=== Concept car introductions ===
==== World debuts ====
- Genesis New York Concept
- Lincoln Navigator Concept

==== North American debuts ====
- 2017 Honda Civic Hatchback Prototype
- Volkswagen BUDD-e (US auto show debut)

=== Race car introductions ===
- Acura NSX GT3
- Honda Civic Coupe GRC

== 2015 ==
The 2015 show was held from April 3 through April 12, with press preview days on April 1 and 2.

=== Production car introductions ===
==== World debuts ====
- 2016 Buick Enclave Tuscan Edition
- 2016 Cadillac CT6
- 2016 Chevrolet Malibu
- 2016 Chevrolet Spark
- 2016 GMC Terrain (refresh)
- 2016 Infiniti QX50 (refresh)
- 2016 Jaguar XF
- 2016 Kia Optima
- 2016 Lexus RX
- 2016 Mazda MX-5 Club
- 2016 McLaren 570S
- 2016 Mercedes-Benz GLE-Class (refresh)
- 2016 Mitsubishi Outlander (refresh)
- 2016 Nissan Maxima
- 2016 Porsche Boxster Spyder
- 2016 Range Rover SVAutobiography
- 2016 Range Rover Sport HST Limited Edition
- 2016 Scion iA
- 2016 Scion iM
- 2016 Toyota RAV4 Hybrid

==== North American debuts ====
- Aston Martin Vulcan
- 2016 BMW Alpina B6 xDrive Gran Coupe (refresh)
- 2016 Ford Focus RS
- 2016 Hyundai Tucson
- 2016 Smart Fortwo
- 2016 Mercedes-AMG G65

=== Concept car introductions ===
==== World debuts ====
- Honda Civic (10th generation) Concept
- Lincoln Continental Concept
- Subaru BRZ STi Performance Concept

==== North American debuts ====
- Infiniti QX30 Concept

=== Race car introductions ===
- Acura ILX Endurance Racer
- Subaru WRX STi Rallycross car (VT15x)

== 2014 ==
The 2014 show was held from April 18 through April 27, with press preview days on April 16 and 17.

=== Production car introductions ===
==== World debuts ====
- 2015 Acura TLX (production version)
- 2015 Aston Martin DB9 Carbon Edition
- 2015 Aston Martin Vantage GT
- 2014–15 Audi RS 7 Dynamic Edition
- 2015 BMW M4 Convertible
- 2015 BMW X4
- 2015 Chevrolet Corvette Z06 Convertible
- 2015 Chevrolet Cruze (facelift)
- 2015 Dodge Challenger (facelift)
- 2015 Dodge Charger (refresh)
- 2015 Ford Focus (4-door sedan), Focus Electric (facelift)
- 2015 Ford Mustang 50 Year Limited Edition
- 2015 Infiniti Q70 (facelift)
- 2015 Infiniti QX80 (facelift), QX80 Limited
- 2015 Kia Sedona
- 2015 Mazda MX-5 Miata 25th Anniversary Edition
- 2015 Mercedes-Benz S63 AMG Coupé
- 2015 Mini Countryman (facelift)
- 2015 Nissan Murano
- 2015 Nissan Versa (facelift)
- 2014 Scion FR-S RS 1.0
- 2014 Scion xB RS 10.0 (Electric Quartz)
- 2015 Subaru Outback
- 2015 Toyota Camry (refresh)
- 2015 Volkswagen Jetta (facelift)

==== North American debuts ====
- 2015 Alfa Romeo 4C
- 2016 Audi A3 Sportback TDI
- 2015 BMW 4 Series Gran Coupé
- 2015 BMW Alpina B6 xDrive Gran Coupe
- 2015 Chevrolet Trax (U.S. debut)
- 2015 Ford Focus (5-door hatchback) (facelift)
- 2015 Hyundai Sonata
- 2015 Jeep Renegade

=== Concept car introductions ===
==== World debuts ====
- Ford Transit Skyliner
- Land Rover Discovery Vision Concept

==== North American debuts ====
- BMW Concept X5 eDrive
- Volkswagen Golf SportWagen (pre-production concept)

== 2013 ==
The 2013 show was held from March 29 through April 7, with press preview days on March 27 and 28.

=== Production car introductions ===
==== World debuts ====
- 2014 Acura MDX
- 2015 Audi A3 and S3 sedan (press-only preview)
- 2014 Buick LaCrosse (facelift)
- 2014 Buick Regal (facelift)
- 2014 Cadillac CTS
- 2014 Chevrolet Camaro (facelift), Camaro Z/28
- 2014 Chevrolet SS
- 2014 Dodge Durango (facelift)
- 2014 Honda Odyssey (facelift)
- 2014 Hyundai Equus (facelift)
- 2014 Infiniti QX60 Hybrid
- 2014 Jaguar XJR
- 2014 Jaguar XKR-S GT
- 2014 Jeep Cherokee
- 2014 Kia Forte Koup
- 2014 Kia Optima (facelift)
- 2014 Kia Soul
- 2014 Mercedes-Benz B-Class Electric Drive
- 2014 Mercedes-Benz CLA45 AMG
- 2014 Nissan Pathfinder Hybrid
- 2014 Range Rover Sport
- 2014 Scion tC (facelift)
- 2013 Shelby 1000 S/C
- 2014 Subaru XV Crosstrek Hybrid
- 2014 Toyota Highlander
- 2014 Volvo S60, V60, and XC60 R-Design

==== North American debuts ====
- 2014 BMW 3 Gran Turismo
- 2014 Chevrolet Corvette Stingray Convertible
- 2014 Mitsubishi Mirage
- 2014 Porsche 911 GT3
- Rolls-Royce Wraith
- 2015 Volkswagen Golf
- 2014 Volvo S60, S80, XC60, and XC70 (facelifts)

=== Concept car introductions ===
==== World debuts ====
- Subaru WRX Concept

==== North American debuts ====
- Audi A3 Sportback e-tron concept
- BMW Concept Active Tourer

== 2012 ==
The 2012 show was held from April 6 through April 15, with press preview days on April 4 and 5.

2012 New York International Auto Show Highlights

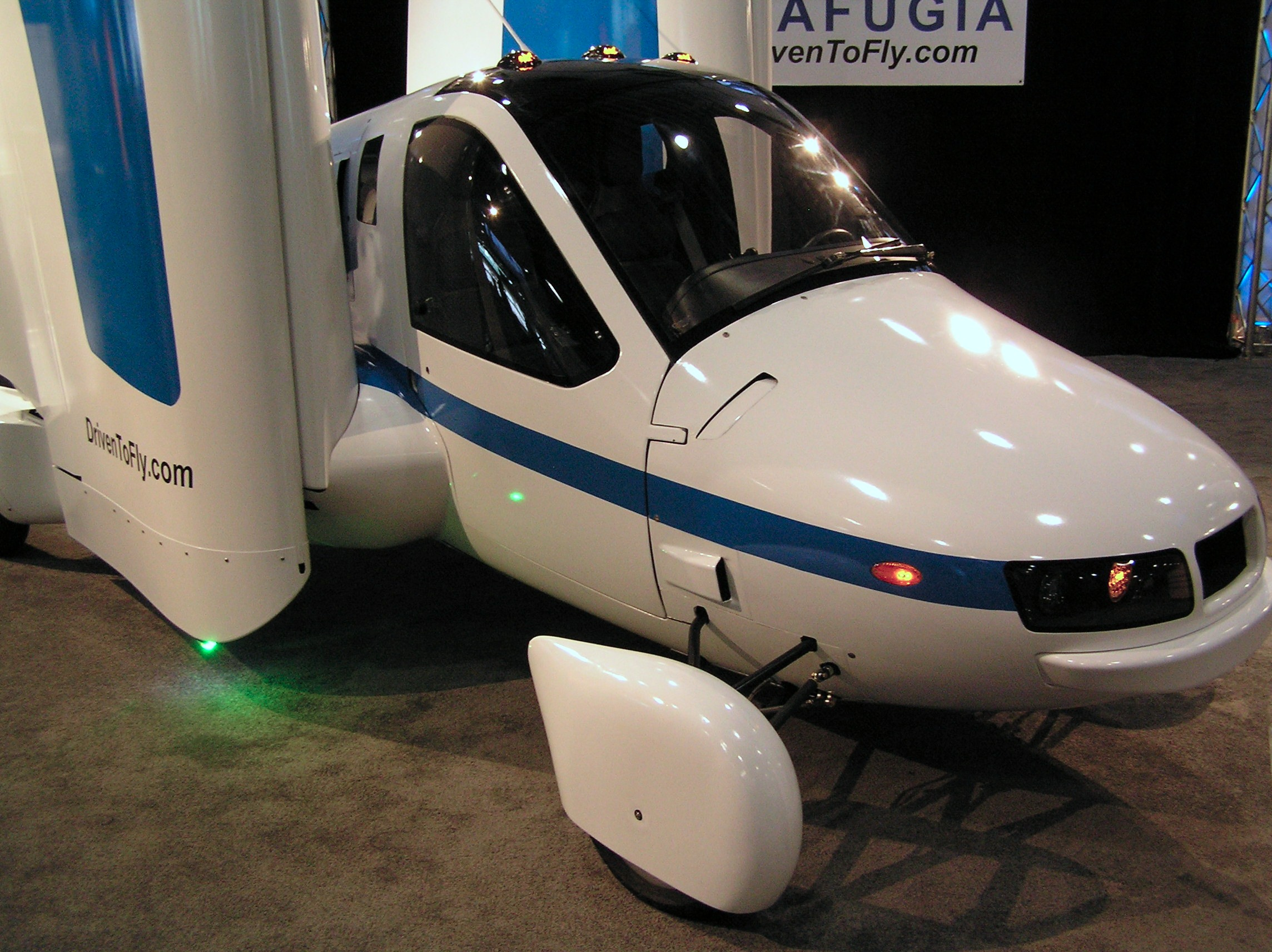
Terrafugia Transition drivable airplane

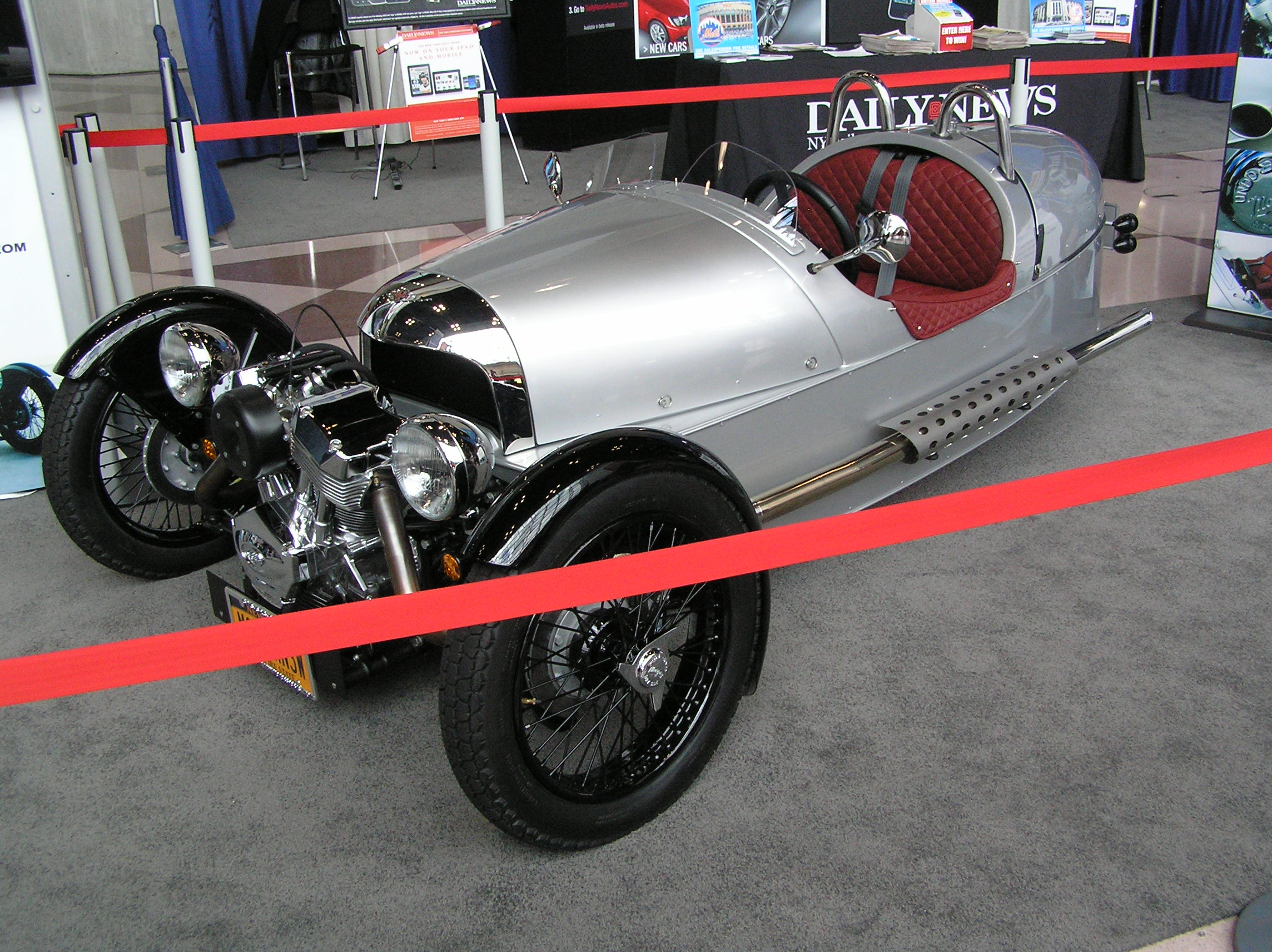
Morgan 3 Wheeler

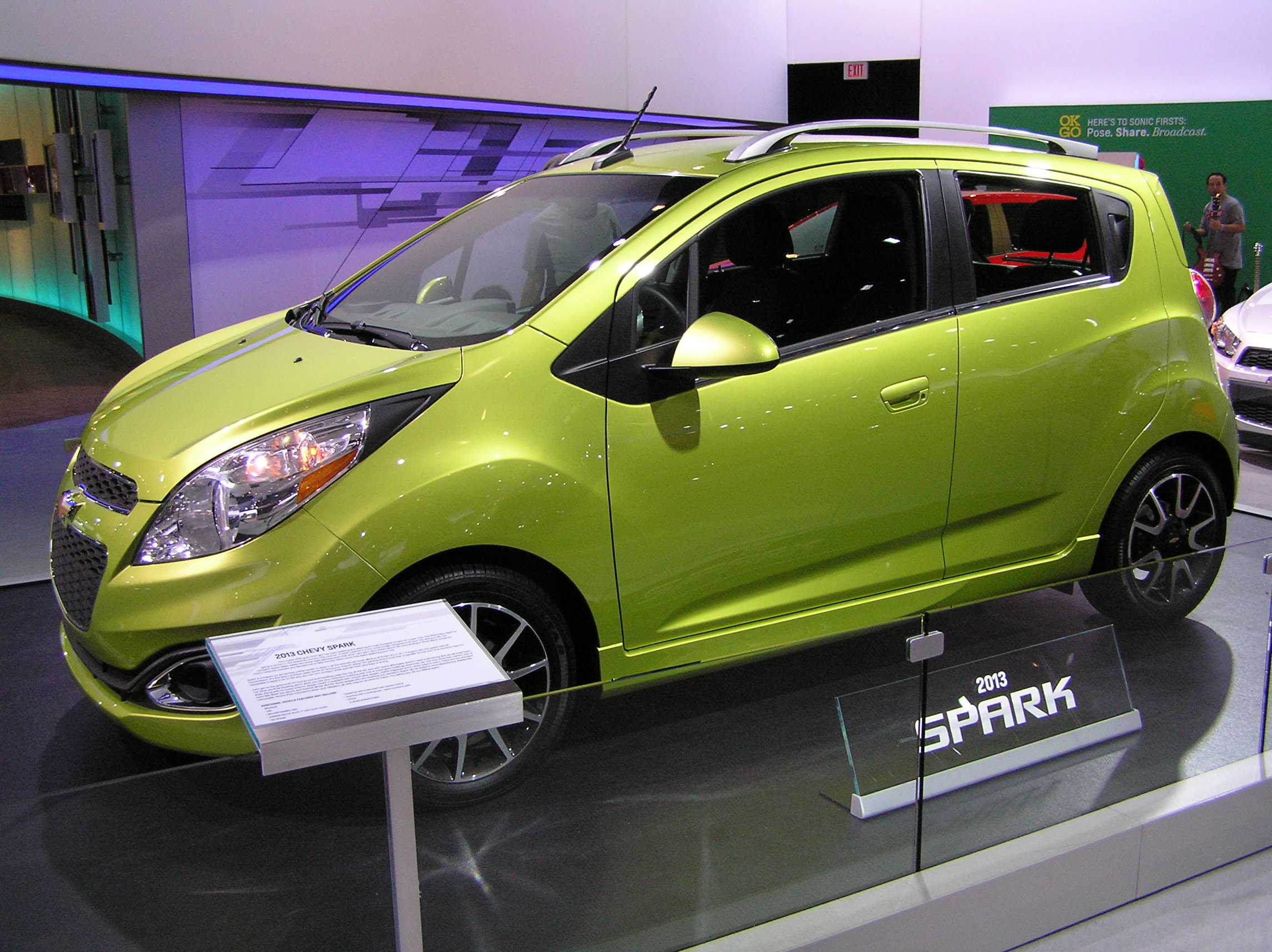
Chevrolet Spark

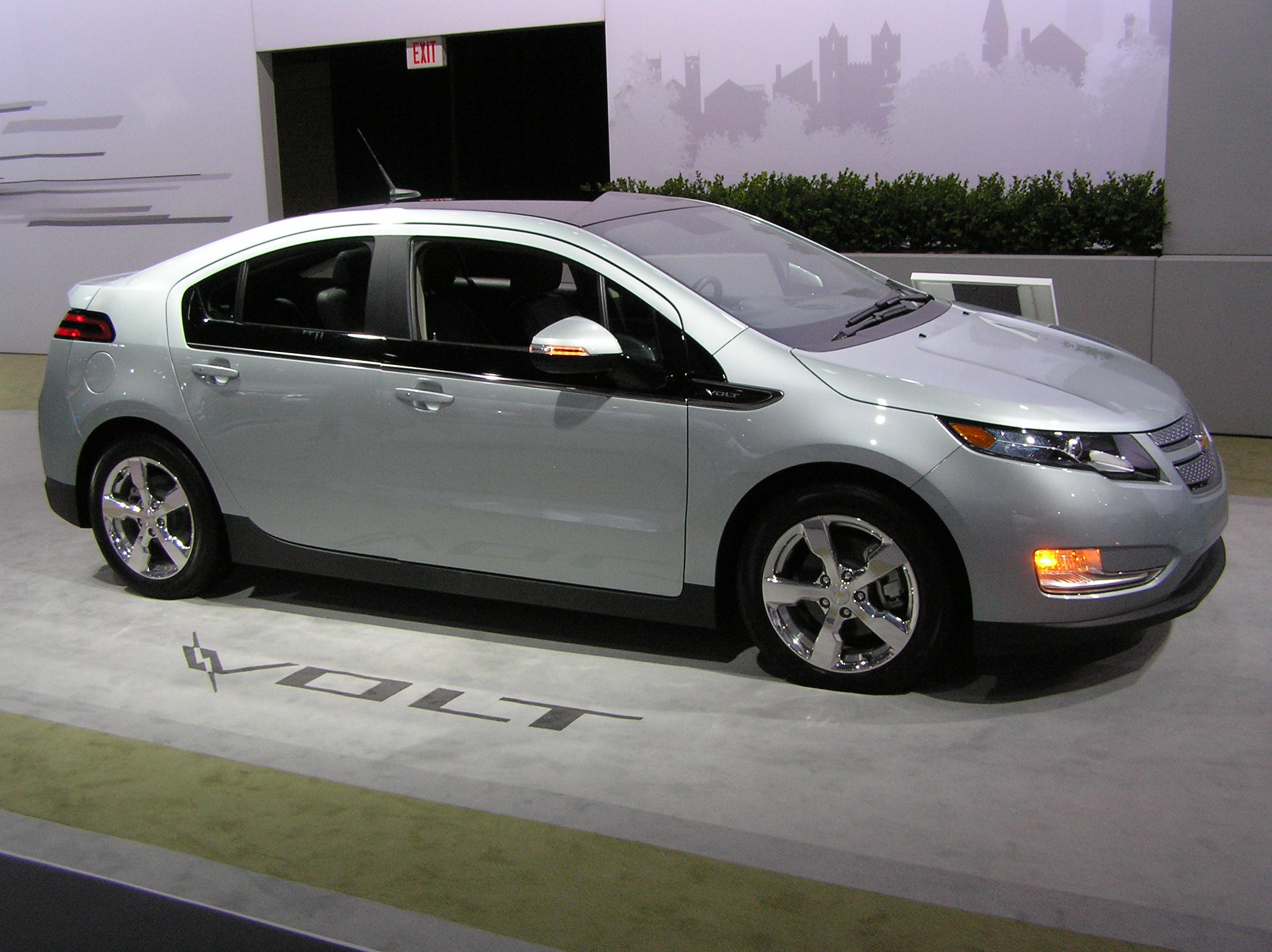
Chevrolet Volt

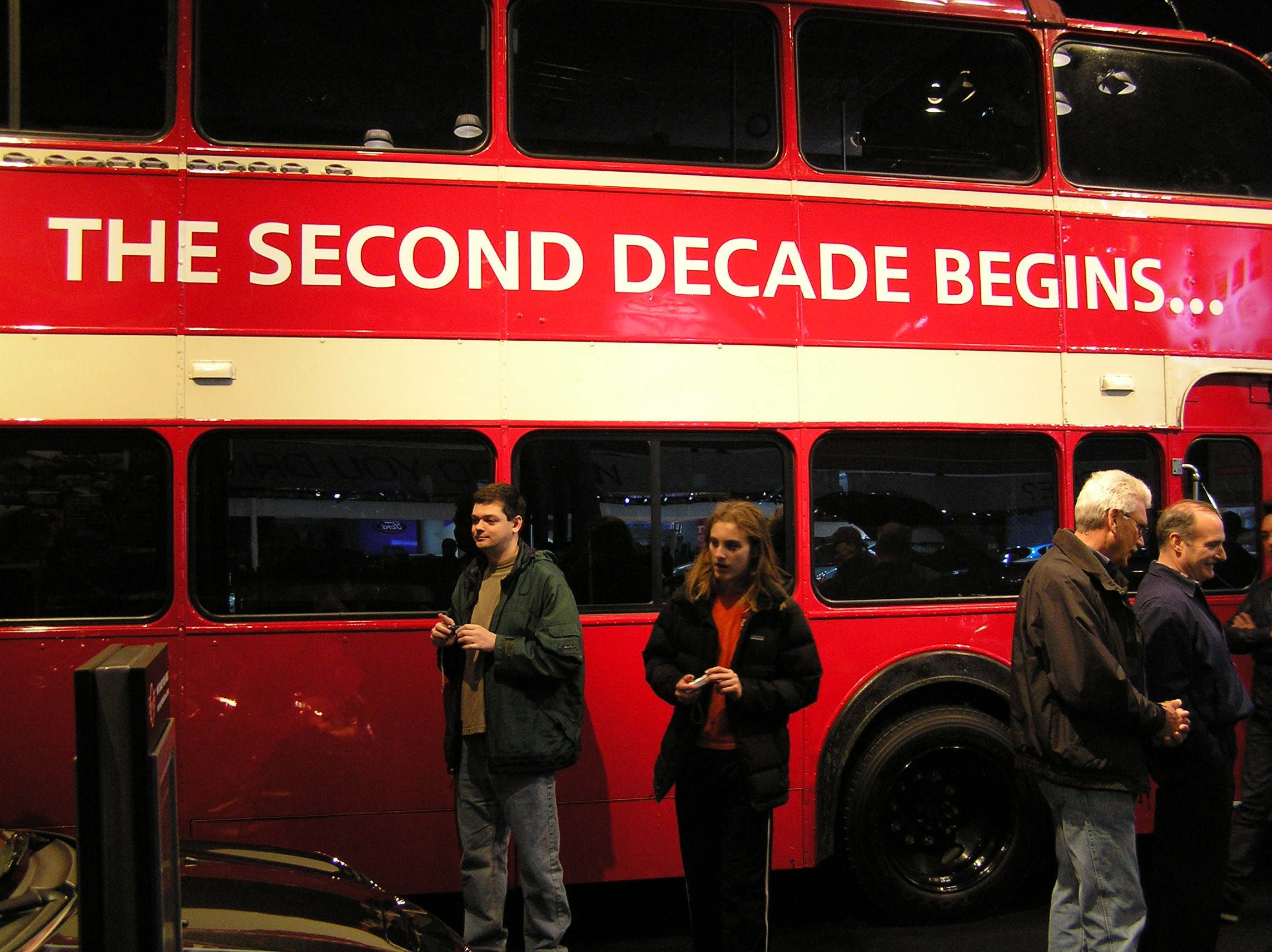
London Routemaster bus in the Mini USA booth

=== Production car introductions ===
==== World debuts ====
- 2013 BMW X1 (facelift)
- 2013 Buick Enclave (facelift)
- 2013 Cadillac SRX (facelift)
- 2014 Chevrolet Impala
- 2013 Chevrolet Traverse (facelift)
- 2013 Ford Explorer Sport
- 2013 GMC Terrain Denali
- 2013 Hyundai Santa Fe Sport
- 2013 Lexus ES
- 2013 Lincoln MKZ
- 2013 Mercedes-Benz GL-Class (X166)
- 2013 Mercedes-Benz GLK-Class (facelift)
- 2013 Mercedes-Benz SL65 AMG
- 2013 Mitsubishi Outlander Sport
- 2013 Nissan Altima

Ram 1500 (facelift)

- 2013 Shelby 1000
- 2013 SRT Viper
- 2013 Subaru Legacy (facelift)
- 2013 Subaru Outback (facelift)
- 2013 Subaru XV Crosstrek
- 2013 Toyota Avalon

==== North American debuts ====
- 2012 BMW M6
- 2013 Lexus RX 350 F Sport
- Mini Countryman John Cooper Works
- 2013 Porsche Cayenne Diesel
- 2013 Toyota Venza (facelift)

=== Concept car introductions ===
==== World debuts ====
- Acura RLX concept
- DeLorean Electric
- Fisker Atlantic
- Honda Crosstour concept
- Infiniti LE

==== North American debuts ====
- Mazda Takeri
- Volkswagen (Passat) Alltrack concept

Nissan also introduced the 2014 Nissan NV200 Taxi, the New York City "Taxi of Tomorrow", on the evening before show press days began. It was on display at the show as well.

== 2011 ==
The 2011 show was held from April 22 through May 1, with press preview days on April 20 and April 21.

=== Production car introductions ===
==== World debuts ====
- 2013 Chevrolet Malibu ECO
- 2012 Chevrolet Sonic Z-Spec accessories
- 2011 Chrysler 200 S sedan, S convertible
- 2012 Chrysler 300 SRT8, S, C Executive Series
- 2012 Dodge Avenger R/T
- 2012 Dodge Charger Mopar Edition
- 2013 Ford Taurus
- 2012 Honda Civic
- 2012 Jaguar XF (facelift)
- 2012 Jeep Grand Cherokee SRT8
- 2012 Kia Rio sedan
- 2012 Kia Soul
- 2012 Mercedes-Benz C63 AMG Coupe
- 2012 Nissan Versa
- 2012 Porsche Panamera Turbo S
- 2012 Shelby GTS
- 2012 Shelby GT500 Super Snake
- 2012 Subaru Impreza

==== North American debuts ====
- 2012 BMW 6 Series Coupe
- 2013 Chevrolet Malibu
- 2012 Fiat 500C
- 2012 Hyundai Accent (U.S. debut)
- Lotus Evora S, IPS
- 2012 Mazda3 (U.S. debut)
- 2012 Volkswagen Beetle

=== Concept car introductions ===
==== World debuts ====
- Dodge Avenger Mopar/Magneti Marelli Rally Car
- Lexus LF-Gh
- Nissan Leaf NISMO RC
- Scion FR-S Concept
- Suzuki Kizashi Apex Concept
- Suzuki Kizashi EcoCharge Concept

==== North American debuts ====
- Infiniti IPL G Convertible concept
- Mazda Minagi
- Mercedes-Benz A-Class Concept
- Saab PhoeniX
- Volkswagen Bulli

Infiniti announced production of the JX mid-size crossover, to be revealed as a concept at the Pebble Beach Concours d'Elegance in August, and in production form at the LA Auto Show in November. Mazda announced production of the 2013 CX-5 compact crossover, to be revealed at the Frankfurt Motor Show in September.

== 2010 ==
The 2010 show was held from April 2 through April 11, with press preview days on March 31 and April 1.

=== Production car introductions ===
==== World debuts ====
- 2011 Acura TSX Sport Wagon
- 2011 BMW X5
- 2011 Cadillac CTS-V Sport Wagon
- 2011 Chevrolet Cruze Eco
- 2011 Chevrolet Cruze RS
- 2011 Hyundai Sonata Hybrid
- 2011 Hyundai Sonata 2.0T
- 2011 Infiniti QX56
- 2011 Kia Forte five-door
- 2011 Kia Optima
- 2011 Kia Sorento SX
- 2011 Lincoln MKZ Hybrid
- 2011 Mercedes-Benz R-Class
- 2011 Scion iQ
- 2011 Scion tC
- 2011 Subaru Impreza WRX
- 2011 Subaru Impreza WRX STI
- 2011 Suzuki Kizashi Sport

==== North American debuts ====
- 2011 BMW 335is
- 2011 Hyundai Equus
- 2011 Kia Sportage
- 2011 Lexus CT200h
- 2011 Mercedes-Benz E-Class Wagon
- 2011 Mini Countryman
- 2011 Mitsubishi Outlander Sport
- 2011 Nissan Juke
- 2011 Volkswagen Touareg / Touareg Hybrid
- 2011 Volvo S60

== 2009 ==
The 2009 show was held from April 10 until April 19, with press preview days on April 8 and April 9.

=== Production car introductions ===
- 2010 Bentley Continental Supersports (North American debut)
- 2010 BMW 760Li
- 2010 BMW X6 M
- 2010 GMC Terrain
- 2010 GMC Yukon Denali Hybrid
- 2011 Jeep Grand Cherokee
- 2010 Kia Forte Koup
- 2010 Land Rover LR4
- 2010 Land Rover Range Rover
- 2010 Land Rover Range Rover Sport
- 2010 Mazdaspeed3 (North American debut)
- 2010 Mazda CX-7 (United States debut)
- 2010 Mazda CX-9
- 2010 Mercedes-Benz E63 AMG
- 2010 Mercedes-Benz ML450 Hybrid
- 2009 Nissan Nismo 370Z
- 2010 Nissan 370Z Roadster
- 2010 Porsche 911 GT3 (North American debut)
- 2010 Subaru Legacy
- 2010 Subaru Outback
- 2010 Volkswagen GTI

=== Concept car introductions ===
- Acura ZDX Concept
- Ford Transit Connect Family One Concept
- Mercedes-Benz E250 BlueTec Concept
- Mitsubishi Outlander GT Prototype
- Hyundai Nuvis
- Scion iQ Concept
- General Motors/Segway PUMA (Personal Urban Mobility and Accessibility)

== 2008 ==
The 2008 show was held from March 21 until March 30, with press preview days on March 19 and March 20.

=== Production car introductions ===
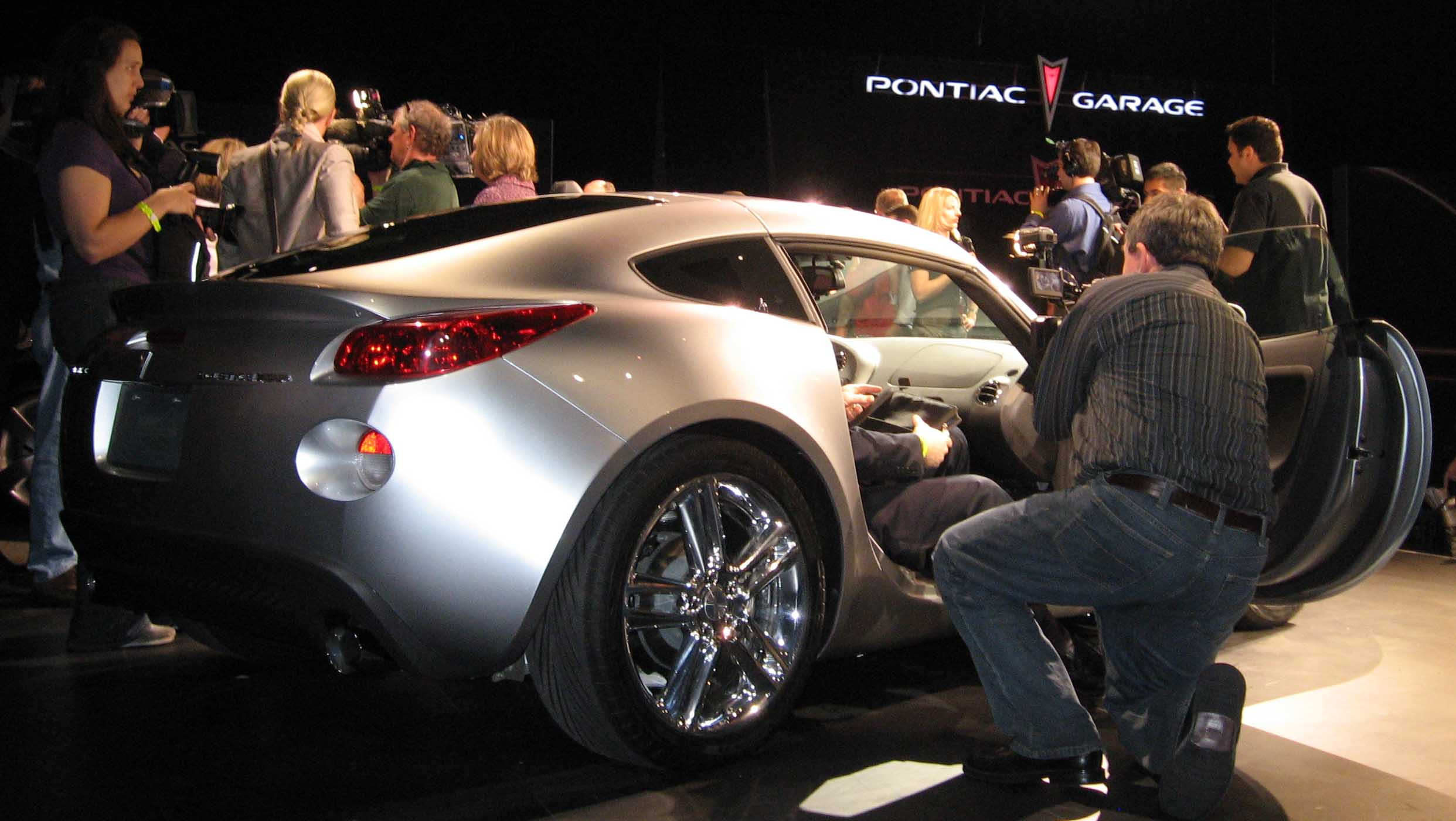
Journalists crowd around the Pontiac Solstice coupe during its unveiling

- 2009 Acura TSX
- 2009 Dodge Challenger
- 2009 Honda Fit (North American debut)
- 2009 Hyundai Genesis Coupe
- 2009 Kia Optima
- 2009 Mercedes-Benz M-Class
- 2009 Nissan Maxima
- 2009 Pontiac G8 GXP
- 2010 Pontiac G8 sport truck
- 2009 Pontiac Solstice Coupe
- 2008 Porsche Boxster RS60 Spyder (North American debut)
- 2009 Volvo XC60 (North American debut)

=== Concept car introductions ===
- Ford Transit Connect Taxi Concept
- Kia Koup
- Nissan Cube Denki, Quazé, Nielus concepts
- Saab 9-X BioHybrid (North American debut)
- Scion Hako Coupe
- Suzuki Kizashi 3
- Saleen S5S Raptor

== 2007 ==
The 2007 show was held from April 6 until April 15, with press preview days on April 4 and April 5.

=== Production car introductions ===
- 2008 Audi R8
- 2008 Audi TT
- 2008 Bentley Brooklands
- 2008 BMW 5 Series
- 2009 BMW M3
- 2008 Buick Lacrosse Super
- 2008 Cadillac STS
- 2008 Callaway C16 Convertible
- 2008 Ford Expedition Funkmaster Flex Edition
- 2009 Ford Flex
- 2008 Ford Shelby GT500KR
- 2008 Ford F-150 Foose Edition
- 2008 Honda S2000 CR
- 2008 Hummer H2
- 2008 Hummer H3 Alpha
- 2008 Infiniti G37 coupe
- 2008 Jeep Grand Cherokee
- 2008 Jeep Liberty
- 2008 Lexus LX 570
- 2008 Mercedes-Benz CL65 AMG
- 2008 Mercedes-Benz CLK63 AMG Black Series
- 2008 Mercedes-Benz C-Class
- 2007 Nissan Nismo 350Z
- 2008 Porsche 911 Turbo Cabriolet
- 2008 Subaru Impreza
- 2008 Subaru Impreza WRX
- 2008 Subaru Tribeca
- 2008 Suzuki SX4
- 2008 Volkswagen Jetta Sportwagen
- 2008 Volkswagen Touareg 2
- 2008 Volvo V70 Wagon
- 2008 Volvo XC70

=== Concept car introductions ===
- Chevrolet Beat Concept
- Chevrolet Groove Concept
- Chevrolet Trax Concept
- Hyundai Genesis Concept
- Infiniti EX
- Lexus LF-A Concept
- Toyota FT-HS
- Mazda Nagare

== 2006 ==
The 2006 show was held from April 14 until April 23, with press preview days on April 12 and April 13.

=== Production car introductions ===
- 2007 Acura RDX
- 2007 Audi A4/S4 Cabriolet
- 2007 Audi TT
- 2007 Bentley Continental GTC
- 2007 BMW Z4/M Coupe
- 2007 Chrysler 300 Extended Wheelbase
- 2006 Ford Shelby GT-H
- 2007 Hyundai Elantra
- 2007 Infiniti G35 sedan
- 2007 Jeep Patriot
- 2007 Jeep Wrangler Unlimited
- 2007 Kia Sorento
- 2007 Lexus LS 600h L
- 2007 Mazda CX-9
- 2006 Mazdaspeed3 (North American introduction)
- 2007 Mercedes-Benz E-Class
- 2006 MINI Cooper Works GP
- 2007 Mitsubishi Outlander
- 2007 Nissan Altima
- 2007 Nissan Maxima
- 2007 Saleen/Parnelli Jones Limited Edition Mustang
- 2007 Saturn Aura
- 2007 Saturn Outlook
- 2007 Saturn Sky Red Line
- 2006 Scion tC RS 2.0 (Blue Blitz Mica)
- 2007 Subaru Impreza WRX STI Limited
- 2007 Subaru Legacy Spec B
- 2007 Suzuki XL-7
- 2007 Volvo XC90

=== Concept car introductions ===
- Acura MDX Concept
- Honda Element SC Concept
- Pontiac G6 GXP Concept
- Saturn PreVUE
- Scion Fuse

== 2005 ==
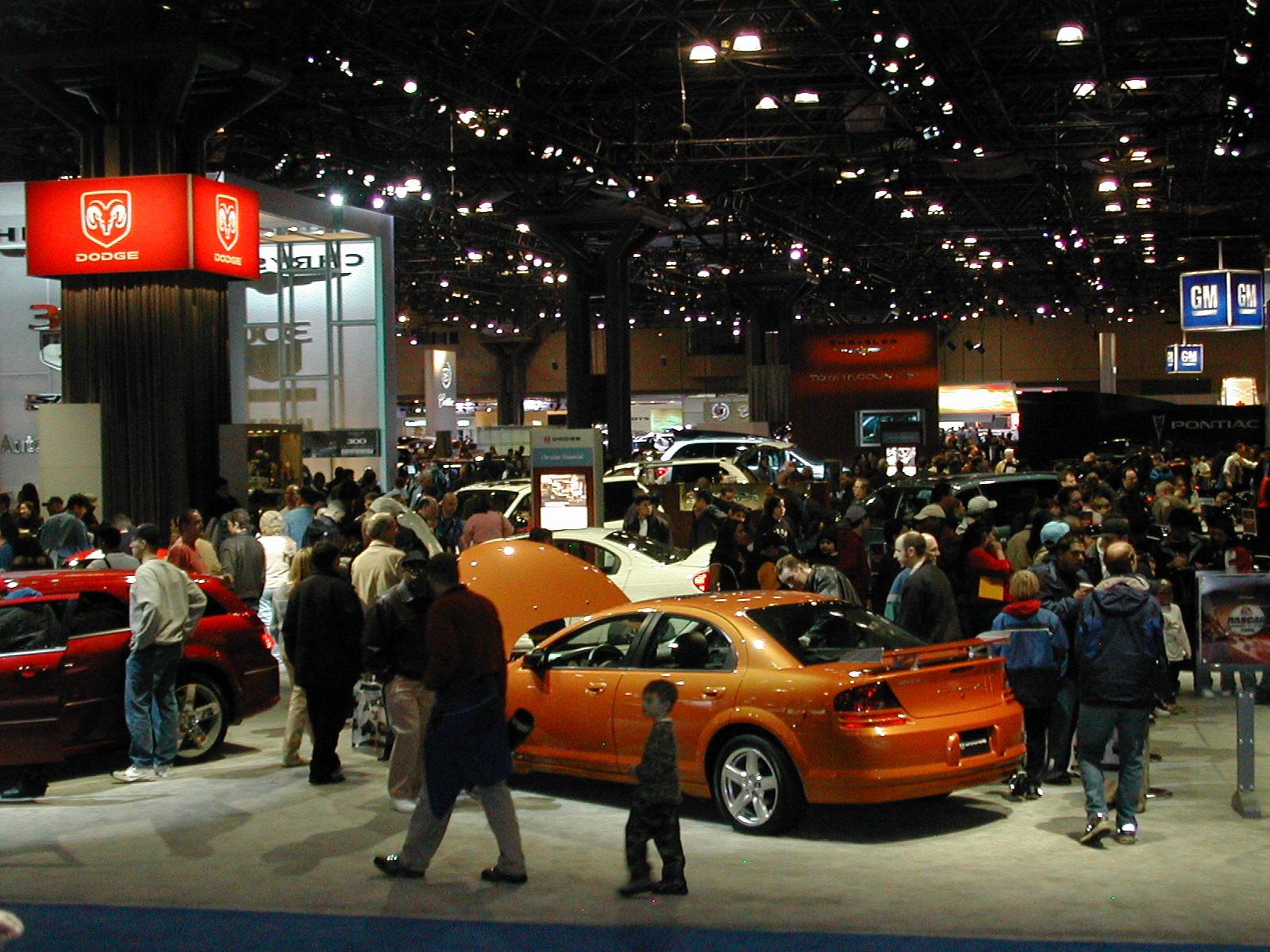
A small section of the 2005 show

The 2005 show saw the following introductions:

=== Production car introductions ===
- 2006 Bentley Continental Flying Spur
- 2006 BMW 325i
- 2006 Chevrolet TrailBlazer SS
- 2006 Chevrolet Malibu
- 2006 Chevrolet Malibu Maxx SS
- 2006 Cadillac XLR-V
- 2006 Dodge Charger SRT-8
- 2006 Ferrari F430 Spyder
- 2005 Ford GT
- 2006 Hyundai Accent
- 2006 Hyundai Azera
- 2006 Isuzu i-Series
- 2006 Jeep Commander
- 2006 Jeep Grand Cherokee SRT-8
- 2006 Lexus GS 450h
- 2006 Lexus IS
- 2006 Mercedes-Benz R-Class
- 2005 Mitsubishi Lancer Evolution
- 2006 Shelby Cobra GT500 (Ford Mustang)
- 2006 Subaru Forester 2.5 XT Limited
- 2006 Subaru Forester L.L. Bean Edition

=== Concept car introductions ===
- Ford Explorer Sport Trac Adrenalin SVC Concept
- Nissan Sport Concept
- Scion t2B
- Suzuki Concept X2

== 2004 ==
The 2004 show saw the following introductions:

=== Production car introductions ===
- 2005 Acura RL
- 2005 Audi A6 4.2
- 2005 Bentley Arnage T
- 2005 Cadillac STS
- 2005 Ford Escape Hybrid
- 2005 Infiniti Q45
- 2005 Jaguar XJ
- 2005 Jeep Grand Cherokee
- 2005 Jeep Liberty
- 2005 Kia Spectra
- 2005 Land Rover LR3
- 2005 Mercedes-Benz SL65 AMG
- 2005 Mini Cooper Convertible
- 2005 Nissan Altima SE-R
- 2005 Nissan Xterra
- 2005 Saab 9-7X
- 2005 Suzuki Forenza Wagon

=== Concept car introductions ===
- Acura RL Prototype
- Audi RSQ
- Buick Velite
- Infiniti M45 Concept
- Lexus LF-C
- Lincoln Zephyr Concept

== 2003 ==
The 2003 show saw the following introductions:

=== Production car introductions ===
==== World debuts ====
- Mitsubishi Diamante (being the export version of the Australian-made Mitsubishi Magna)
- Toyota Prius (XW20)

=== Concept car introductions ===
- Acura TL
- 300C
- Lexus HPX
- Lincoln Navigator K

== 2002 ==
The 2002 show saw the following introductions:

=== International debuts ===
- 2003 Buick Park Avenue (facelift)
- 2004 Chrysler Pacifica
- 2003 Ford Crown Victoria (facelift)
- 2003 Ford Power Rangers Auto Mighty Dragon Mobile
- 2003 Honda Element
- 2003 Infiniti G35
- 2003 Infiniti M45
- 2003 Land Rover Discovery (facelift)
- 2003 Lincoln Aviator
- 2003 Nissan Murano
- 2003 Saturn Ion
- 2003 Saturn L-Series (facelift)

=== North American debuts ===
- Mazda 6 Estate

== 2001 ==
The 2001 show saw the following introductions:

=== International debuts ===
- Acura RSX
- Ford Focus S2
- Ford Focus ZX5
- Honda Civic Si
- Infiniti I35
- Land Rover Discovery Series II Kalahari
- Mitsubishi Lancer
- Nissan Altima
- Subaru Outback H6-3.0 VDC Sedan

=== North American debuts ===
- Aston Martin V12 Vanquish
- Audi A4
- Jaguar X-Type
- Kia Sedona
- Mercedes-Benz C-Class SportsCoupe
- Mercedes-Benz G500

=== Concept car introductions ===
- Chrysler PT Cruiser Convertible Concept
- Land Rover Freelander Kensington Concept
- Lincoln MK9 Concept
- Hummer H2 SUT Concept
- Hyundai LZ450 Study
- Nissan Chappo
- Suzuki SX Concept
- Toyota Roxy ECHO Concept
- Toyota Matrix Race Car Concept

== 2000 ==
The 2000 show saw the following introductions:

=== International debuts ===
- Lexus SC430
- Chevrolet Venture (facelift)
- Chrysler Sebring (convertible)
- Infiniti Q45
- Panoz Esperante

=== Concept cars ===
- Kia Rio SV Concept

== 1999 ==
=== International debuts ===
- Ford Taurus
- Acura RL
- BMW 323Ci
- BMW 328Ci
- Buick Century 2000
- Chevrolet Cavalier Convertible
- Chevrolet Cavalier Sedan
- Chevrolet Cavalier Z24 Coupe
- Chevrolet Monte Carlo SS
- Infiniti I30
- Mazda MPV
- Mitsubishi Eclipse
- Mitsubishi Montero Sport
- Nissan Pathfinder
- Oldsmobile Aurora
- Pontiac Sunfire
- Pontiac Firebird Trans Am "30th Anniversary"
- Pontiac Firebird Trans Am "30th Anniversary" Daytona 500 Pace Car
- Pontiac Firebird Trans Am Convertible "30th Anniversary"
- Saab 9-3 Viggen
- Saturn L-Series
- Subaru Legacy GT (sedan and wagon)
- Volvo S80

=== Concept car introductions ===
- Chevrolet Suburban Show Truck
- Dodge Caravan R/T Concept
- GMC Yukon Show Truck
- Isuzu VX-O2 Concept
- Nissan Tino Concept

== 1998 ==
- Chevrolet Tracker
- Mitsubishi SST Spyder Concept
- Audi A6 Avant
- Callaway C12
- Chevrolet Tracker Convertible
- Infiniti G20
- Infiniti Hot Rod
- Isuzu Amigo Hardtop
- Kia Sportage Convertible
- Lincoln LS6/8
- Honda Odyssey
- Hyundai Avatar Concept
- Mitsubishi Galant
- Pontiac Grand Am GT
- Porsche 911 Cabriolet
- Subaru Impreza 2.5RS
- Suzuki Grand Vitara
- Volvo S40
- Volvo V40

== 1997 ==
- Lincoln Town Car
- Audi A4 Avant
- Chevrolet Prizm
- Isuzu VehiCROSS
- Mazda 626 Sedan
- Mitsubishi Diamante SSC Concept
- Nissan Frontier
- Porsche 911 Turbo S
- Subaru Impreza 2.5 RS

== 1996 ==
- Chevrolet Venture
- Jaguar XK8 Convertible
- Mazda Miata M Coupe Concept
- Oldsmobile Silhouette
- Pontiac Trans Sport
- Subaru Legacy 2.5 GT
- Subaru Legacy Outback Limited
- Subaru Impreza Outback Sport

== 1994 ==
=== Production car introductions ===
- Chevrolet Cavalier Sedan
- Chevrolet Cavalier Coupe
- Ford Contour
- Mercury Mystique
- Subaru Legacy
- Subaru Legacy Outback

=== Concept car introductions ===
- Ford Powerstroke Concept
- Mitsubishi Eclipse Convertible Concept

== 1993 ==
- Lincoln Continental
- Alfa Romeo 164 LS
- Infiniti Q45
- Mazda AZ-1 Concept
- Mercury Villager Nautica
- Porsche 911 Carrera 4
- Saab 900
- Saab 900 Coupe

== 1992 ==
- Cadillac Fleetwood Brougham
- BMW 525i Sport Touring Wagon
- IsoRivolta Grifo Grand Touring Coupe
- Nissan Pickup
- Mitsubishi/Boyd Aluma Coupe Concept
- Vector Avtech WX-3
- Vector Avtech WX-3R
- Volkswagen Passat GLX

== 1991 ==
- Acura Vigor
- BMW M5
- Cadillac Seville SLS
- Cadillac Seville STS
- Cadillac Eldorado
- Hyundai Elantra
- Mazda MX-3
- Mitsubishi 3000GT Premier Edition VR-4
- Porsche 911 Carrera Supercharged Strosek C2

== 1989 ==
- Dodge Viper RT/10 Concept
- GMC Syclone Concept
- Oldsmobile California Trofeo

== 1970 ==
- AMC Gremlin

== 1969 ==
- Buick Century Cruiser Concept
- Bob Reisner Milk Truck
- Bob Reisner 'the Bathtub'
- Bob Reisner Invader
- Lamborghini Miura
- Oldsmobile 442 Convertible
- Rowan Electric

== 1968 ==
- AMC AMX-GT

== 1959 ==
- Daimler Dart prototype

== 1957 ==
- Rambler Rebel with Bendix Electrojector

== 1950 ==
- Aston Martin DB2
