= Indi One =

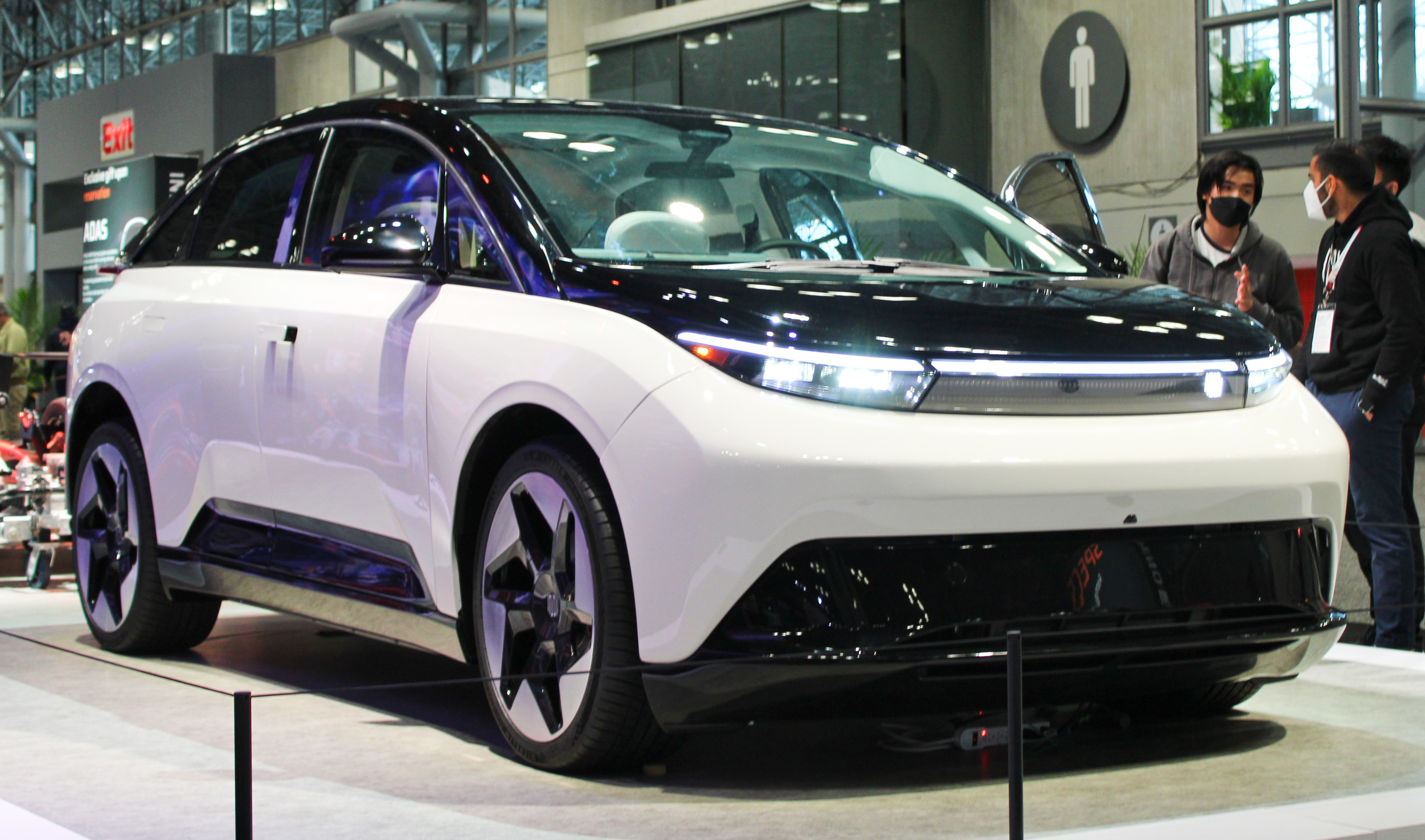
- Indi One at the 2022 New York International Auto Show

Overview
- Manufacturer: Indi EV
- Production: Cancelled
- Assembly: United States: Lordstown, Ohio (Lordstown Assembly)
- Designer: Andre Hudson

Body and chassis
- Class: Compact crossover SUV
- Body style: 5-door coupe SUV
- Layout: Dual-motor, all-wheel drive

Powertrain
- Electric motor: Permanent Magnet Synchronous Reluctance Motor
- Battery: 95 kWh lithium ion
- Electric range: 275 miles (443 km)

Dimensions
- Length: 189 in (4,801 mm)
- Width: 78 in (1,981 mm)
- Height: 67 in (1,702 mm)
- Curb weight: 5,500 lb (2,500 kg)

The Indi One is a battery electric compact crossover SUV developed by Indi EV.

== Overview ==
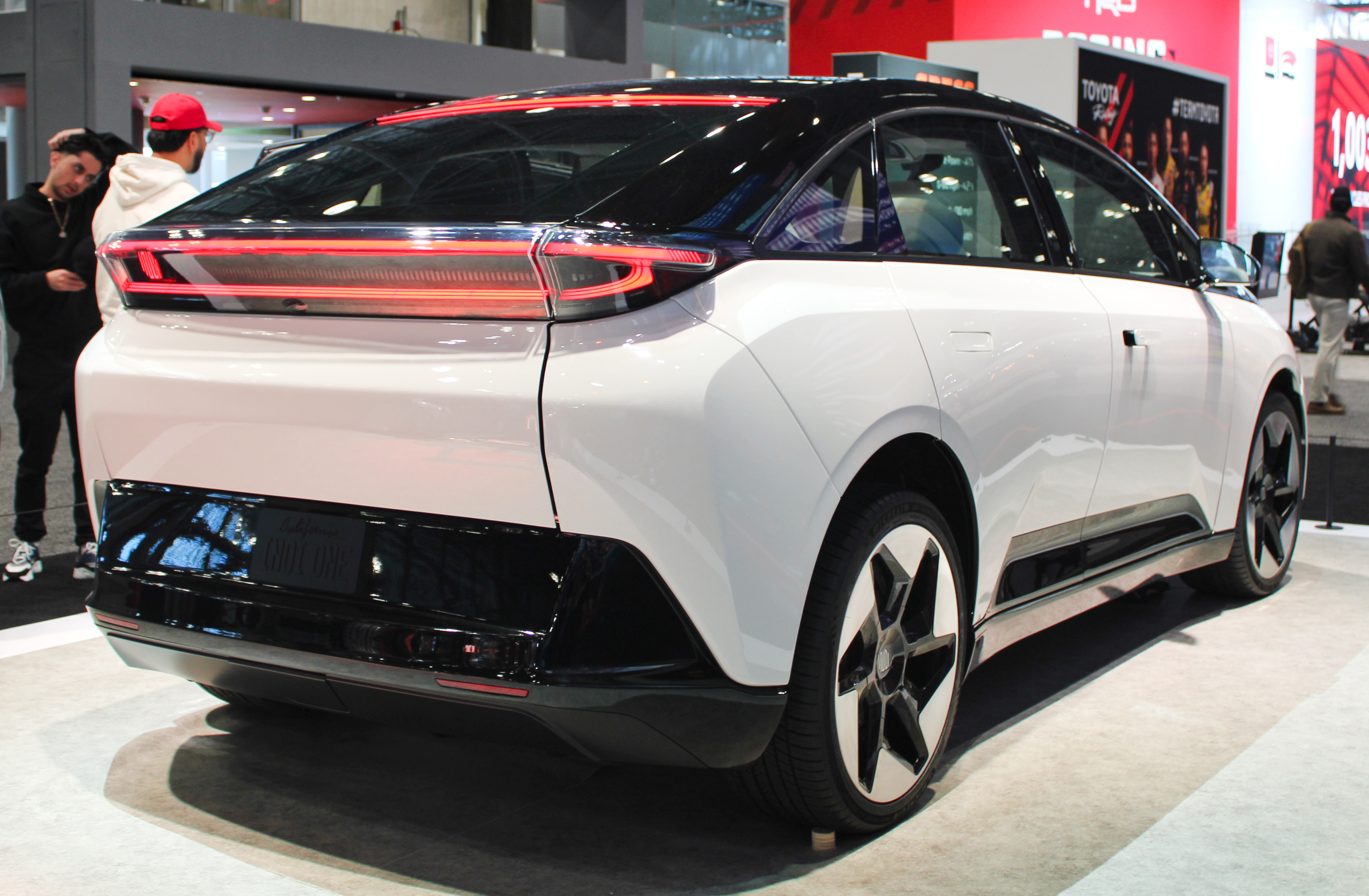
Rear view

The Indi One was presented for the first time in mid-October 2021 as a result of a 4-year construction process initiated by the creation of the Indi startup in 2017 in Los Angeles, California.

The stylist Andre Hudson was responsible for the stylistic design of the car, giving the One its characteristic, futuristic proportions in the style of the so-called Coupe SUVs with a gently sloping roofline and wide LED lighting panels covering the entire width of the body. The two-tone exterior paintwork is matched to large 22-inch alloy wheels. According to the manufacturer's declaration, the crossover was technically equipped with the so-called supercomputer supporting, among others software controlling the propulsion system.

Indi started collecting orders for its first car in the first months of 2022, of which the first copies are to be delivered not earlier than in 2023. The prices at which the range of variants of the One are to be available are expected to be between $45,000 and $65,000. In October 2022, the Taiwanese company Foxconn announced that the production of the One would take place at the Lordstown Assembly at Lordstown, Ohio. However, these plans did not come to fruition due to the bankruptcy of Indi EV in October 2023.

== Specifications ==
The One is a fully electric four-wheel drive vehicle. The battery has a capacity of 95 kWh, allowing drivers travel up to 275 mi (443 km) on a single charge. The vehicle is equipped with a fast charging function.
