= Infiniti LE =

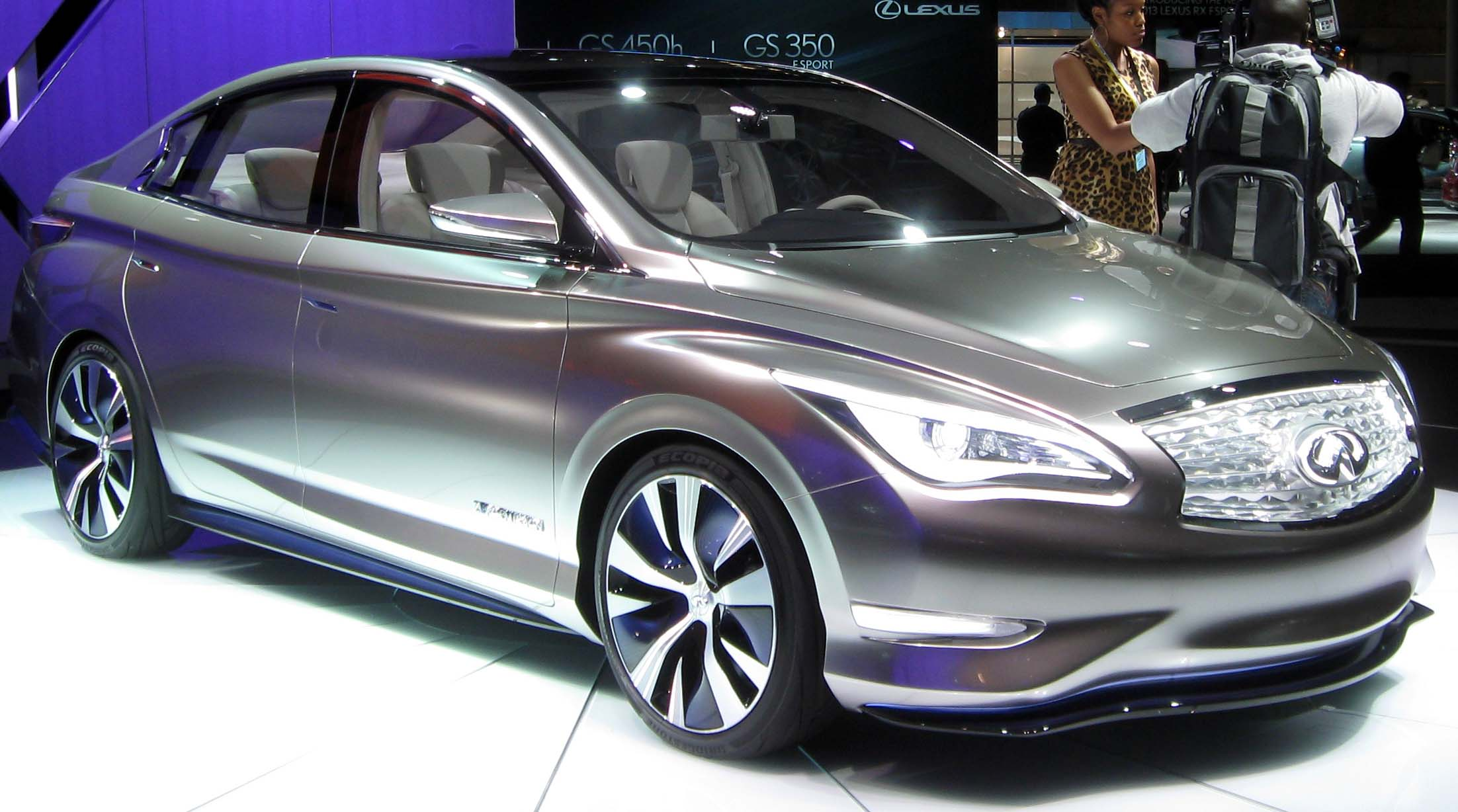

Overview
- Manufacturer: Nissan

Body and chassis
- Class: Mid-size luxury car
- Body style: 4-door sedan
- Layout: FF layout

Dimensions
- Wheelbase: 2,700 mm (106.3 in)
- Length: 4,735 mm (186.4 in)
- Width: 1,806 mm (71.1 in)
- Height: 1,486 mm (58.5 in)

The Infiniti LE is a concept car developed by the Infiniti division of Nissan Motors and was revealed to the public at the 2012 New York Auto Show. The LE name comes from Luxury first and Electric second. An Infiniti spokesperson said the vehicle shown is a "production intent" concept and would be on the market in 2014. In May 2013 the company said that it was waiting for inductive charging industry standards before launching the vehicle.

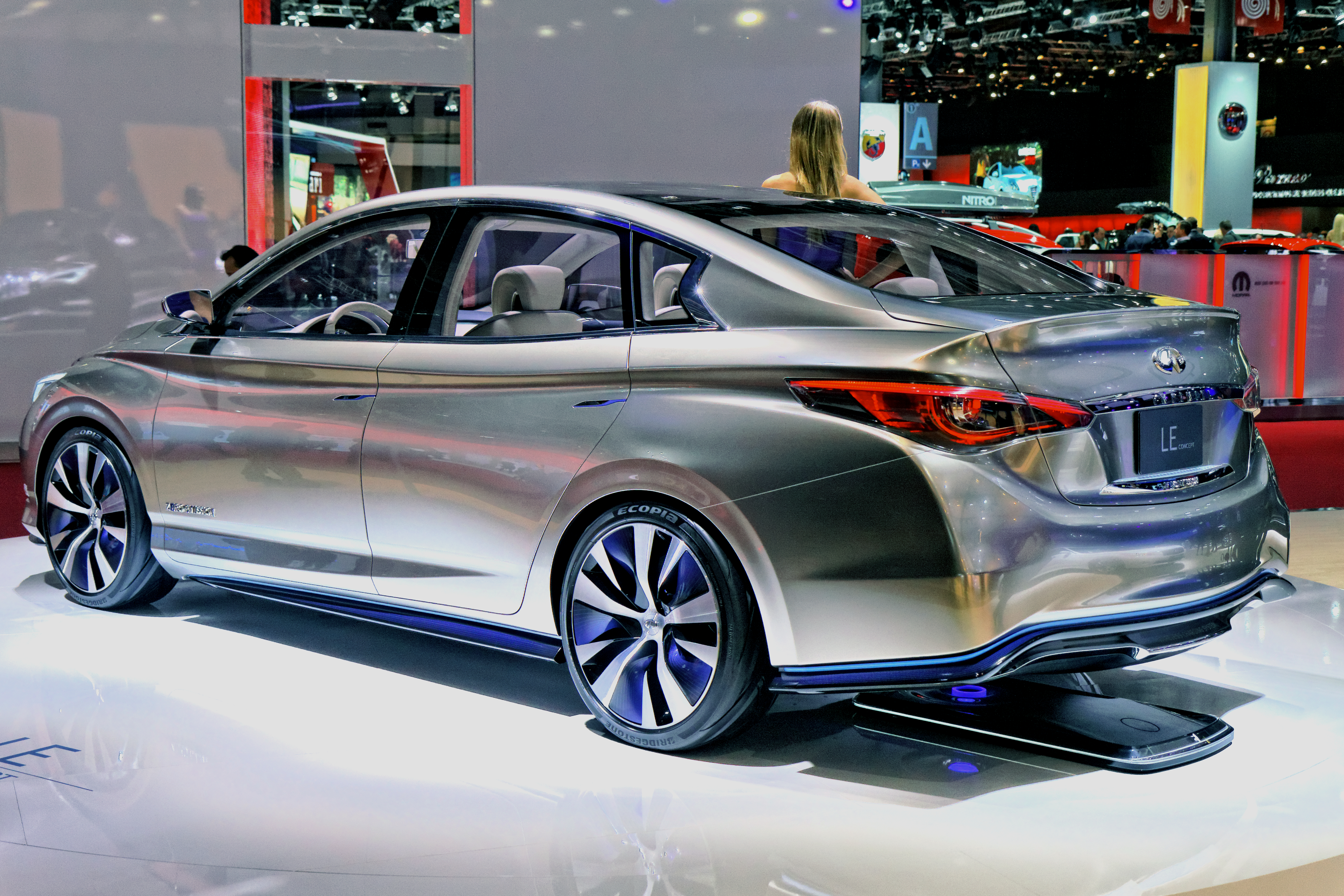
Rear view

The Infiniti LE Concept is based on the Nissan Leaf platform. However the LE concept is powered by a 100 kW (134 hp), 325 N⋅m (240 ft⋅lb) electric motor, rather than the 80 kW (107 hp), 285 N⋅m (210 ft⋅lb) motor used in the Leaf. Like the Leaf, the LE will also utilize a 24 kWh or larger lithium-ion battery pack mounted below the passenger compartment. Driving range on a single charge is estimated to be about 160 km (100 miles). The LE is aerodynamically clean with its high rear deck, aero-treated wheels, rear diffuser, front spoiler and side spoilers to give a drag coefficient of Cd=0.25. The LE would mark the brand's first front-wheel drive car since the 2004 Infiniti I35 if the car goes into production.

A key feature of the LE is its inductive wireless charging. The vehicle can be charged by parking it over a charge point located in the floor, rather than plugging into an electrical outlet. However, the LE can also be charged through its CHAdeMO DC50kW quick charger.

In June 2013, Infiniti CEO Johan de Nysschen said the Infiniti LE was on hold indefinitely as the Infiniti brand was attempting to triple sales by the 2017 fiscal year.

In July 2013, Nissan's head of global planning Andy Palmer said the LE was "not significantly" on hold, but delayed "a little bit" so that Infiniti could incorporate some "interesting advances in electric technology" like new lithium-ion battery technology that would increase range and lower the price.

In July 2014, the LE was reported as in development again. Patents for a more production-ready design for the LE were also found later that year. However, in October 2015, the company again reversed their strategy saying it would not have such a car in its line up until 2020, at the earliest.
