= Mercedes-Benz G500 4×4² =

Off-road vehicle

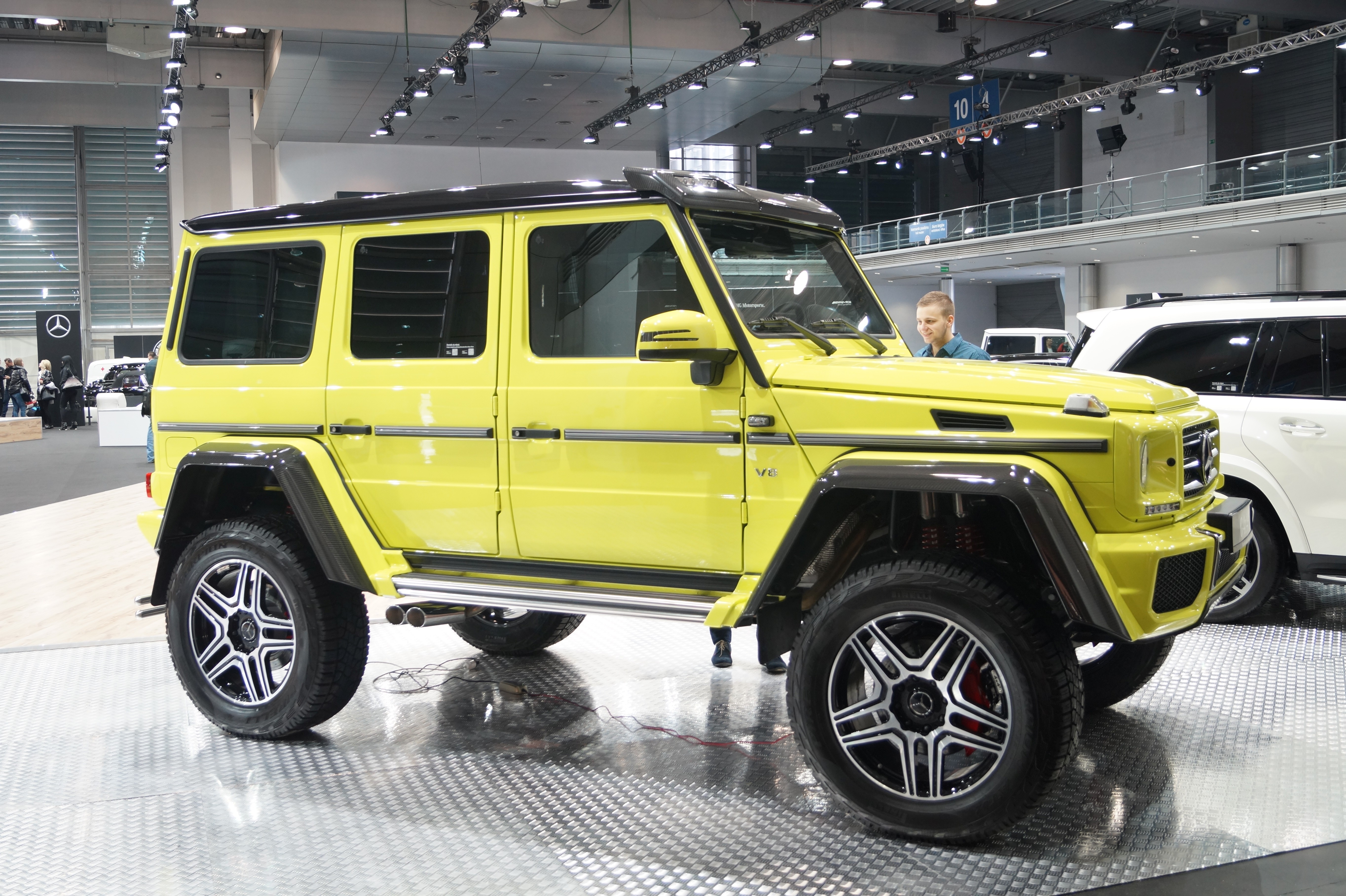
Mercedes G500 / G550 4×4²

The Mercedes-Benz G500 4×4² (or G550 4×4² in the United States and Canada) is a special edition of the W-463 Mercedes-Benz G-Class (1990–2018), built with portal gear axles and much larger wheels and tires, for greatly increased off-road capability. In production since 2015, the model combines the body of a regular long-wheelbase Mercedes G-Class with the portal axles with hub gearing of the much larger Mercedes-Benz G63 AMG 6x6. In addition to the greatly increased ground clearance, the G500 4×4² version has a significantly wider track than regular G-Class models.

Fitted with a twin-turbo V8 engine with up to 416 HP, the vehicle stands out by combining Humvee-like off-road specifications with sports car performance, as well as being one of the very few production cars equipped with portal axles / geared hubs.

== History ==
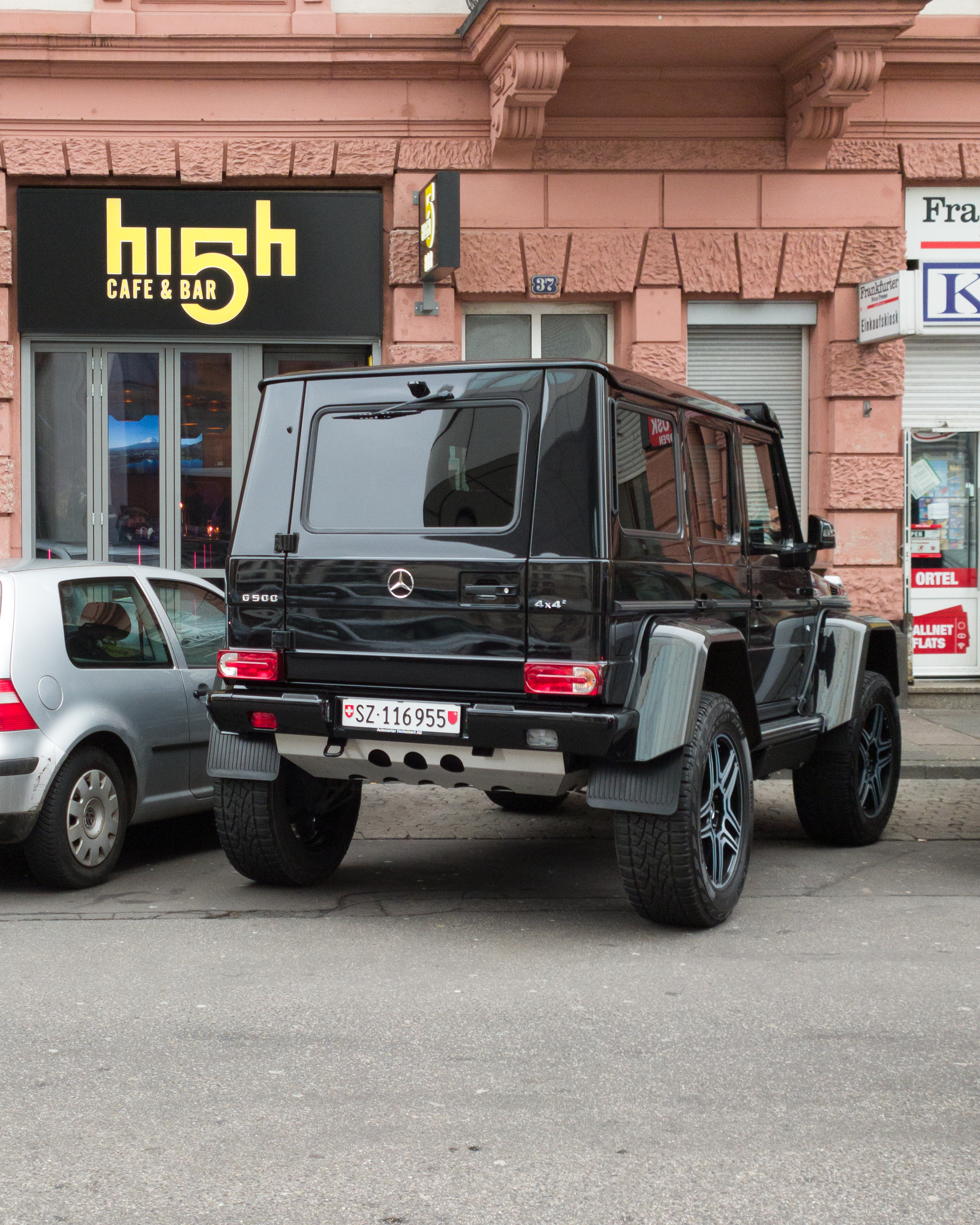
G500 4×4² in Frankfurt, Germany;the portal axle gives a distinct look because the axle does not align with the center of wheel

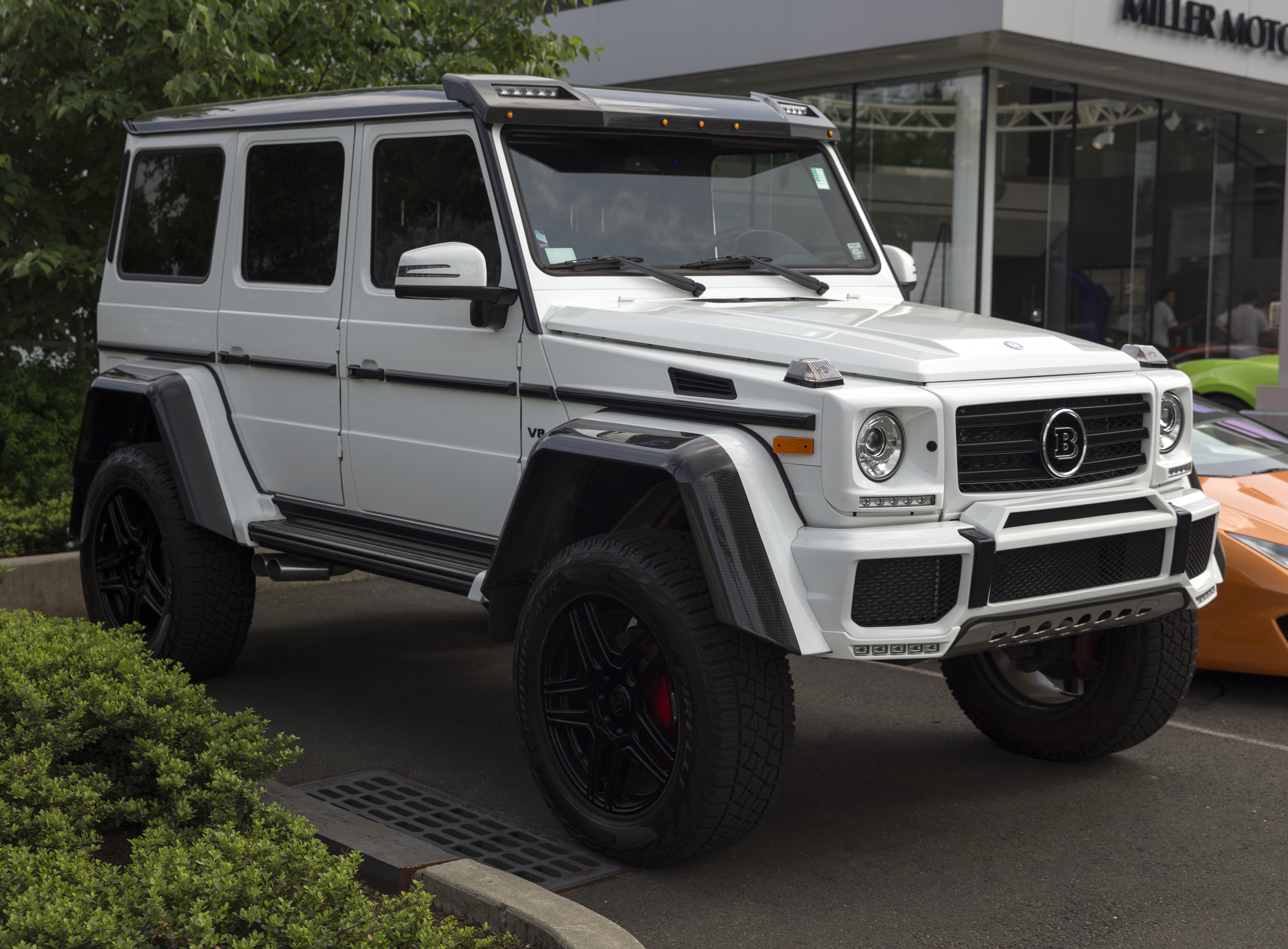
US-market Mercedes-Benz G550 4X4², with some Brabus trim

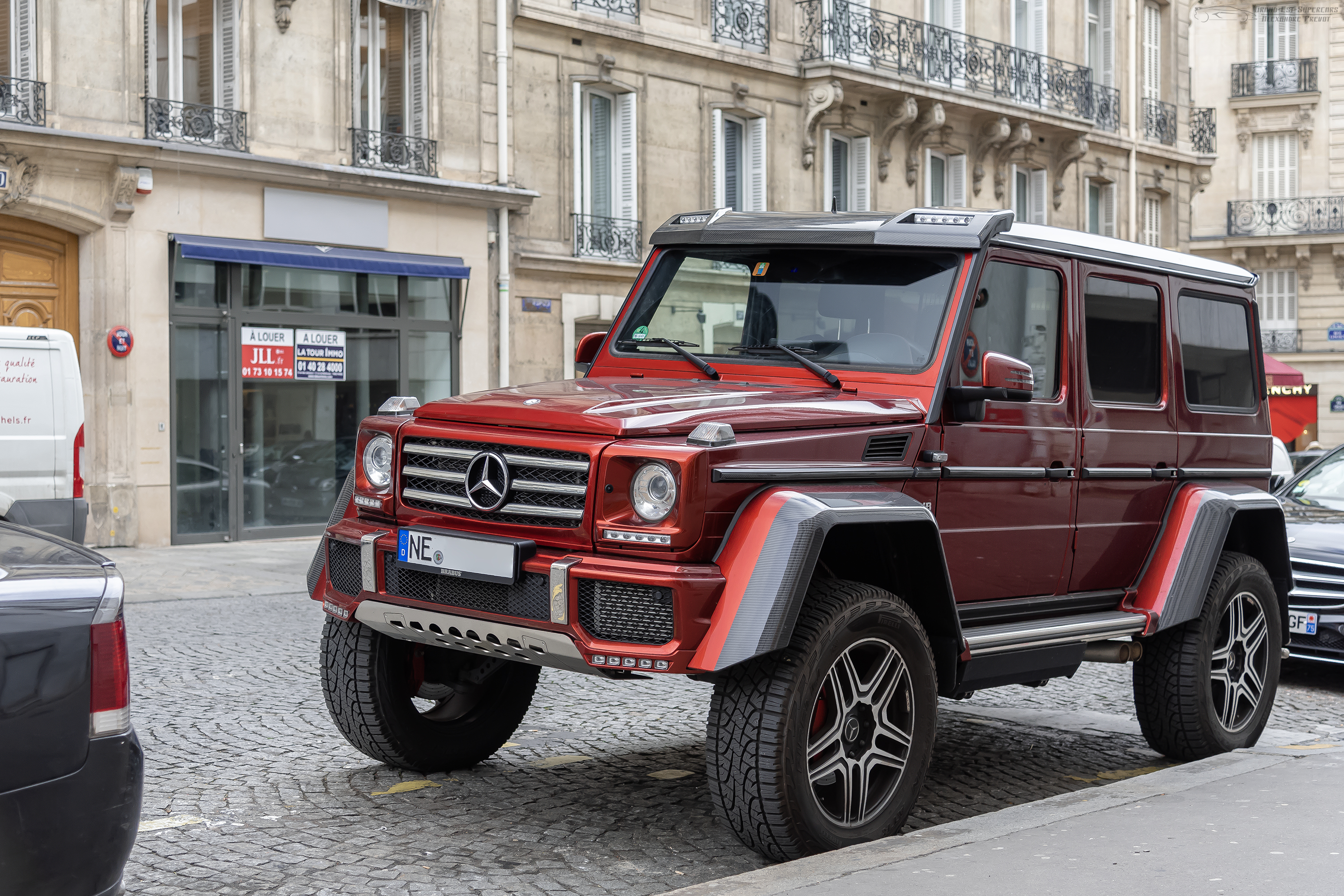
G500 4×4² in France, 2019

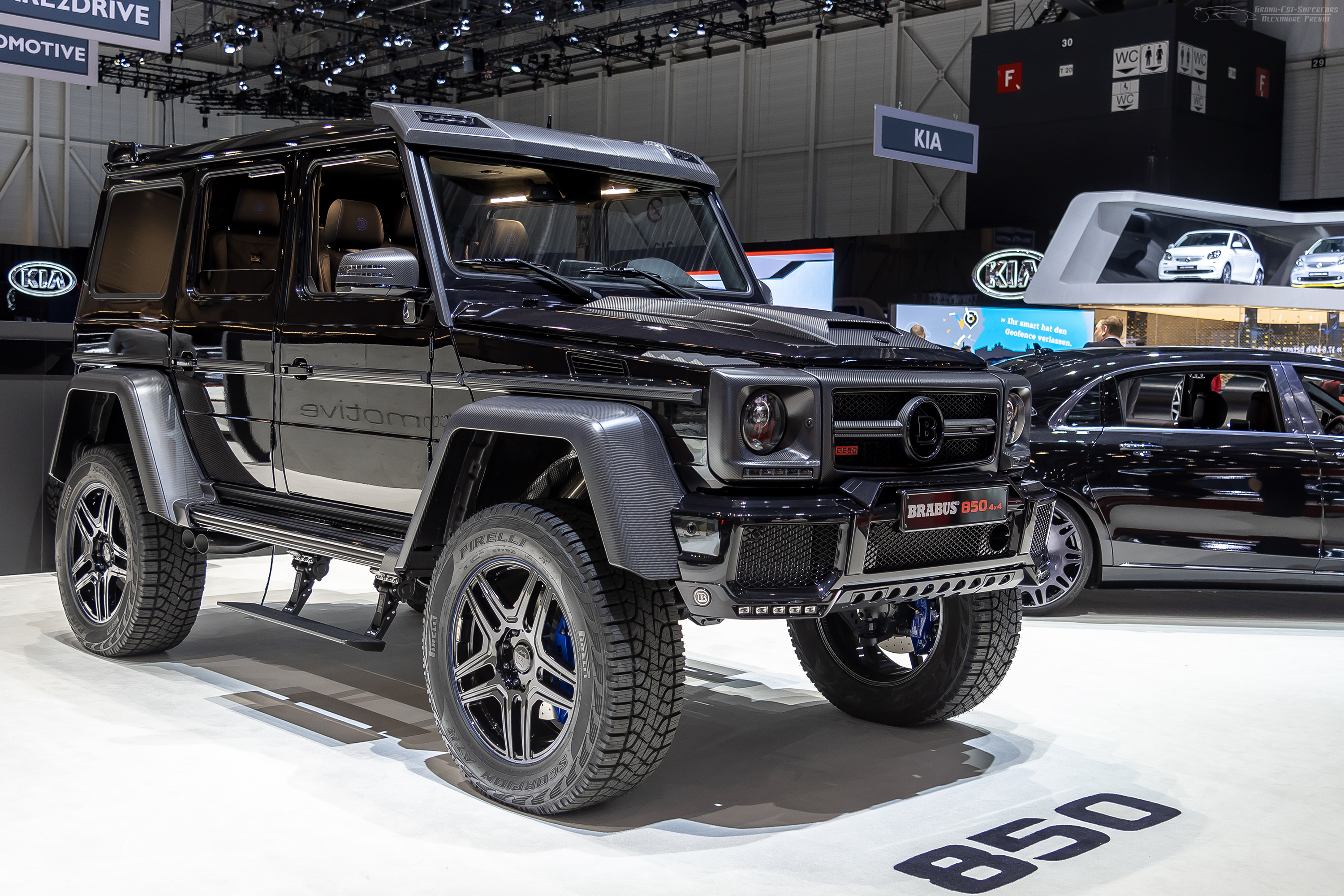
Aftermarket version of this model, the Brabus 850 4X4² Final Edition at French autoshow in 2019

Mercedes-Benz initially showed the G500 4×4² to the public as a concept car, called "Extreme-G". One reason the concept was developed was due to the high demand for the G-Class — in 2014 the G-Class sold over 14,000 units. As a result, a considerable budget for low-volume derivatives was authorized. Positive response to this show car helped endorse the development of a series production version. The car was launched at the Geneva motor show and brought into production in 2015

Though initially not available, the car was introduced to the U.S. market as a 2017 model – called the G550 4x4² – at an introduction price around $200,000. In spite of the difference in designation, it has the same drivetrain as the global version.

It was also sold in Canada under the same name, and this model was part of the G-class range of models at the time which included the G550, G550 4x4^{2} (portal axle), and G 63 (supercharged V8), and G 65 (twin turbo V-12).

== Features and specifications ==
The Mercedes-Benz G500 4×4² has a 4.0 L (244 cu in) twin-turbo V8 petrol engine producing 416 bhp and 450 lb⋅ft (610 N⋅m) of torque, a seven-speed automatic transmission, and three lockable differentials, like any regular G-Class. The special portal axles, geared hubs, and wheels are complemented by raised suspension developed by KW with dual spring and shock damper struts with adjustable damping, on each corner. The car features very aggressive styling, using a front fascia copied from the G63 and G65 AMG with dual side-pipe exhausts that exit ahead of the rear wheels on both flanks. The vehicle's ground clearance of 410 mm (16.1 in), which is less than the 18.2 inches that the M1165 Humvee has, but it can sprint from naught to 60 mph (97 km/h) in less than six seconds. On the inside, the car offers comfort and materials similar to a luxury saloon.

Compared to the already robust standard G550, the 4×4² offers more of every off-road specification: 7.9 in (20 cm) of extra ground-clearance, 15.8 in (40 cm) of additional wading depth, a 21.6-degree steeper approach-angle, 23.4° greater breakover-, and 13.4° extra departure-angle. The front track is wider by 9 inches (23 centimetres), the rear by 10 inches (25 centimetres). The Mercedes 4×4² beats the Hummer H1 on paper in almost every off-road measurement—except for traversing a slope. The 4×4² is limited to a 28.4° bank-angle, compared with the Humvee's 30°.

== See also ==
- Mercedes-Benz G-Class
- Mercedes-Benz GL-Class
- Mercedes-AMG G65 AMG – another special G-Class version of the 2010s
