= Mercedes-AMG G 65 =

Sports utility vehicle

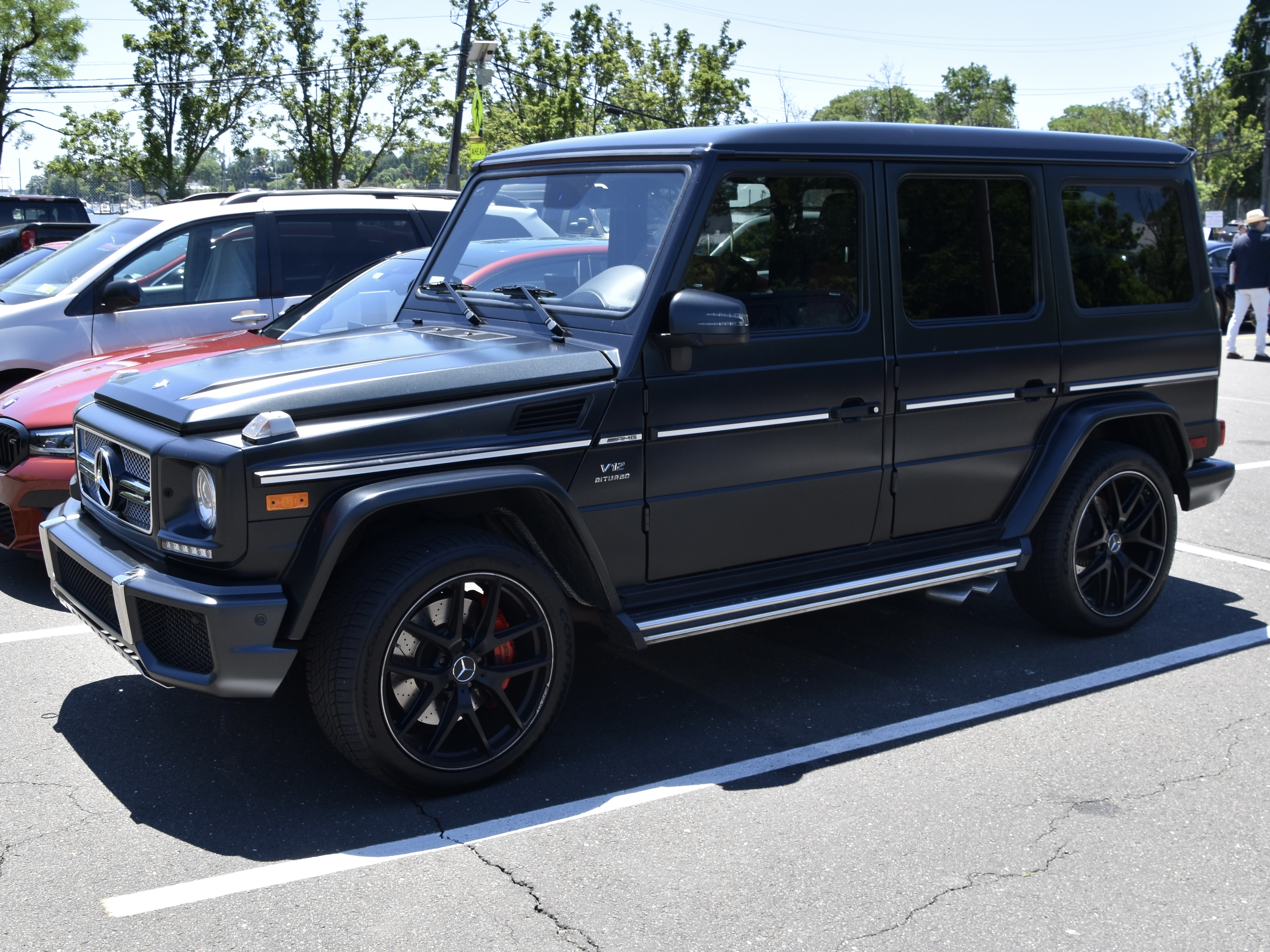
A G 65, with side emblem noting the twin-turbo V-12

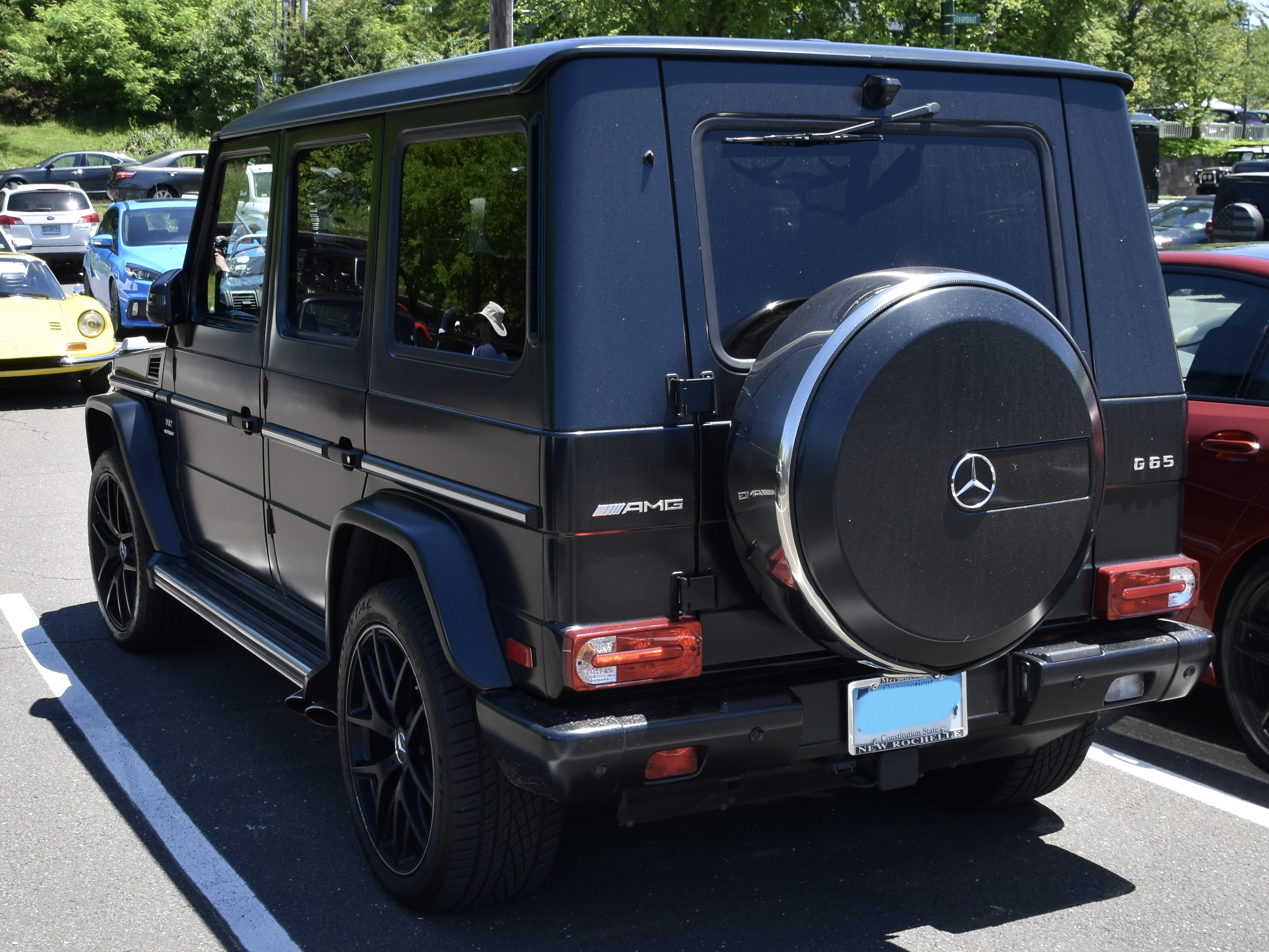
On the rear, AMG and G 65 emblems, along with the classic Mercedes star

The Mercedes-AMG G 65 (previously sold as Mercedes-Benz G 65 AMG) is a twin turbocharged V12 engine version of the Mercedes-Benz G-Class. It was introduced in 2012, went on sale in 2013 in the EU and 2015 in the US, and was produced until the 2018 model year.

== Overview ==
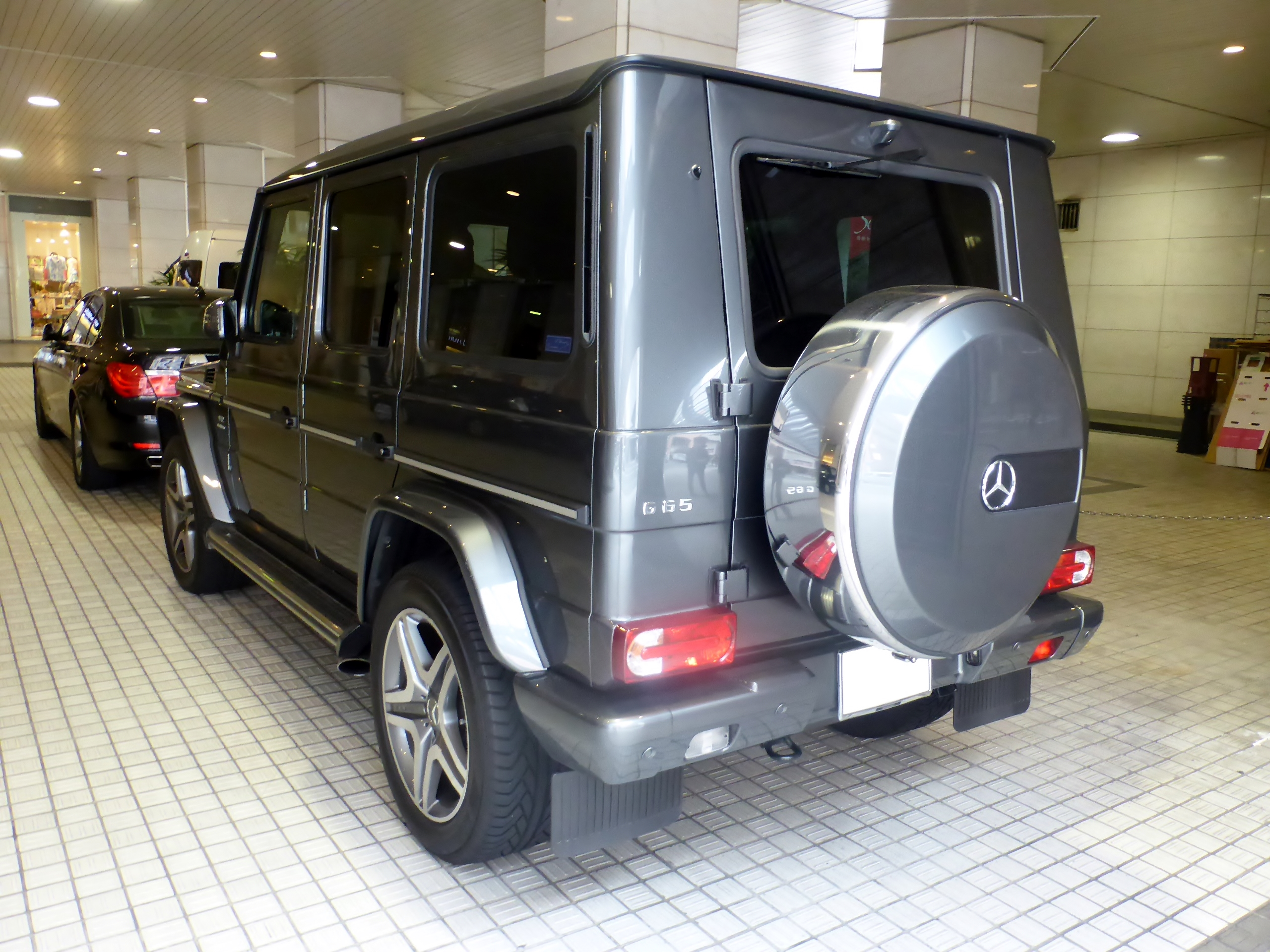
G65 rear

The G 65 is powered by a twin-turbocharged V-12 engine, which originally produced 612 PS (604 hp; 450 kW) at 5,000-5,300 rpm and 738 lb⋅ft (1,001 N⋅m) of torque at 2,300-4,300 rpm, paired with a seven-speed automatic transmission and full-time four wheel drive drivetrain. From 2015 onwards, the V-12 was upgraded to produce 630 PS; 463 kW (621 hp) and 738 lb⋅ft (1,001 N⋅m) of torque. Mercedes says the G 65 has a curb weight of 2,581 kg (5,691 lb), with an EPA rated fuel economy of 11/13 mpg city/highway. In the United States, it cost US$224,000 in the year 2016, another source says it cost US$218,000. It was noted as being cheaper than a previous limited production run of Mercedes-Benz G63 AMG 6x6 (old-style name) from 2013. (note in this period of the 2010s, transition AMG vehicles from Mercedes-Benz to Mercedes-AMG branding. The US version was previewed at the New York Auto Show in the spring of 2015 as a Mercedes-AMG model.

The basic model was introduced in Europe in 2012, and in 2015 was introduced in the United States as a Mercedes-AMG brand model. Prior to its US launch, Daimler experienced sales of over 3000 G-class vehicles, of which about half were the AMG specification version. The German tuning company Brabus also built a modified version of the G65.

The 2016 model was noted by reviewers as being a mix of old design, high-performance, and off-road ability, with it being less luxury focused then contemporaries like the Bentley Bentayga, but more expensive than the supercharged Range Rover or a Jeep with all options topped out. In contrast to the G63 in the MB product line, the 65 uses a twin-turbocharged V-12, rather than a supercharged V-8. Automotive journalists noted that the G65, despite being more expensive than that model, was actually less ostentatious and the V-12 produced smoother more refined power then the supercharged V-8. The G65 is more oriented towards urban driving than off-roading, with low-profile tires and a stated 0-60 mph (96.56 km/h) time of 5.2 seconds, making it fastest of G-Class model offered at the time.

The last year of production for the G 65 was 2018, with the "Final Edition" being the last models. 65 models of the Final Edition were produced, featuring bronze coloured 21 inch wheels and a higher price tag. The G 65 was at the top end of the range, which for example in Canada included the G550, G550 4x4^{2} (portal axle), and G 63 (supercharged V8).

The G 65 is one of only a few V-12 powered SUVs that have been mass-produced. The first was the Lamborghini LM002, introduced in 1986. When Mercedes left this market in 2018, the only other V-12 SUV on sale was the Rolls-Royce Cullinan, joined a few years later by the Ferrari Purosangue.

== Specifications ==
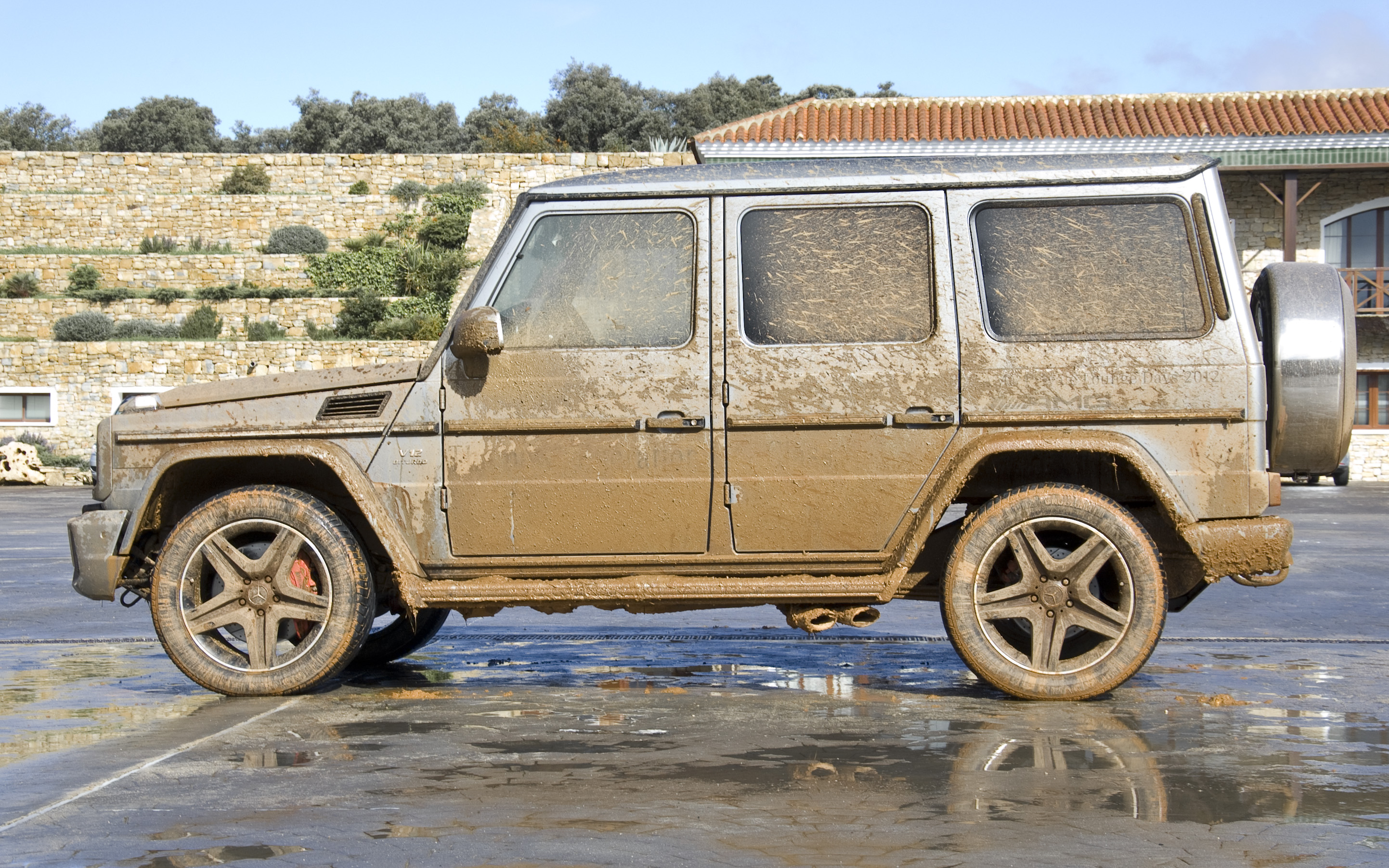
A G65 covered in mud from off-road driving

Size:

- Wheelbase: 112.2 in
- Length: 188.5 in
- Width: 73.0 in (80.9 in with mirrors)
- Height: 76.3 in

Weight:

- 2,581 kg (5,691 lb)

Fuel capacity:

- 25.4 gallons (about 96.15 litres)

Ground clearance:

- 7.71 in

Maximum angle of approach:

- 36 degrees

Maximum angle of departure:

- 27 degrees

== See also ==
- Mercedes-AMG
- List of Mercedes-Benz vehicles
- Mercedes-Benz G500 4×4²
- Lamborghini LM002, one of the only other V-12 powered SUVs
