= 2018 Formula D season =

Motorsport season

The 2018 Formula D season (officially titled Formula DRIFT Black Magic Pro Championship) was the fifteenth season of the Formula D series. The season began on April 7 at Long Beach and concluded on October 13 at Toyota Speedway at Irwindale after eight events. The series celebrated its 100th championship round at Wall Speedway.

== Entries ==
Team	No.	Car	Tires	Driver	Round(s)
Asphalt Anarchy	82	BMW F22	Achilles	(United States) Taylor Hull	2–3, 5–8
Bakchis Motorsports, LLC	723	Nissan Silvia S14	Falken	(Lithuania) Aurimas Bakchis	All
Bridges Racing	43	Dodge Viper ZB II; Nissan Silvia S15 (Note: Kearney suffered a mechanical failure ahead of the New Jersey round, so rented a Nissan Silvia S15 from Forrest Wang.)	Achilles	(Republic of Ireland) Dean Kearney	2–8
Cameron Moore Drift	333	Toyota GT86	Nexen	(United States) Cameron Moore	1, 3, 5
Chris Forsberg Racing	64	Nissan 370Z	Nexen	(United States) Chris Forsberg	All
Coffman Racing	959	Nissan 240SX S13	Achilles	(United States) Matt Coffman	All
Committed Service Brand	316	Nissan Silvia S14	Achilles	(United States) Austin Meeks	All
Drift Cave Motorsports	777	Chevrolet Corvette C6	Falken	(United States) Matt Field	All
Essa Autosport	101	BMW M3 E46	Achilles	(United States) Michael Essa	All
FFF Drifting Department	117	Ferrari 599 GTB Fiorano	Nitto	(Italy) Federico Sceriffo	All
FK53	53	BMW M3 E92	Nexen	(Turkey) (Poland) Faruk Kugay	1–5, 7–8
Get Nuts Lab	808	Nissan Silvia S15	Achilles	(United States) Forrest Wang	All
GReddy Toyota Racing	21	Toyota GT86	Falken (Note: Gushi's car featured prominent Falken Tire sponsorship, but his results counted toward Achilles Radial's tally in the Tire Cup.)	(Japan) Ken Gushi	All
HGK Racing Team	80	BMW M3 E92	Achilles	(Latvia) Kristaps Blušs	1–7
Hohnadell-Huddy Racing	118	Nissan 240SX S14	Nexen	(United States) Alec Hohnadell	All
Inca Madness Racing	17	BMW M3 E46	Nitto	(Peru) Alex Heilbrunn	1–6
Jeff Jones Racing	818	Nissan 370Z	Falken	(United States) Jeff Jones	All
Jerry Yang Racing	123	Nissan GT-R	Achilles	(Japan) Kazuya Taguchi R	All
Jhonnattan Castro Racing	717	Toyota GT86	Nexen	(Dominican Republic) Jhonnattan Castro	All
KORUWORKS	909	Nissan 350Z	Nexen	(United States) Ryan Litteral	3–4, 6–8
Kyle Mohan Racing	99	Mazda MX-5	Nexen	(United States) Kyle Mohan	All
MVK Racing	18	Nissan 240SX S14	Achilles	(United States) Matt Vankirk R	All
Papadakis Racing	151	Toyota Corolla (E210)	Nexen	(Norway) Fredric Aasbø	All
Pawlak Racing	13	Ford Mustang	Falken	(United States) Justin Pawlak	All
RAD Industries	34	Toyota Supra A80	Nexen	(United States) Dan Burkett	All
RTR Motorsports	25	Ford Mustang RTR	Nitto	(United States) Vaughn Gittin, Jr.	All
RTR Motorsports	88	Ford Mustang RTR	Nitto	(United States) Chelsea DeNofa	All
Ryan Tuerck Racing	411	Toyota GT86	Nexen	(United States) Ryan Tuerck	All
Stratton Racing	33	Chevrolet Corvette C6	Achilles	(United States) Dirk Stratton R	All
Team DAI.	9	Subaru BRZ	Falken	(Japan) Daijiro Yoshihara	All
Team Enjuku	352	Nissan Skyline R32 (Note: Lawrence's primary car for 2018 was a Nissan 240SX S14.3 but he suffered two engine failures while tuning on a dynamometer before the season, forcing him to use a Nissan Skyline R32 for the first round in Long Beach.); Nissan 240SX S14.3	Nexen	(United States) Kevin Lawrence	All
Worthouse Drift Team	130	Nissan Silvia S15	Falken	(Republic of Ireland) James Deane	All
Worthouse Drift Team	215	Nissan Silvia S15	Falken	(Poland) Piotr Więcek	All

R Eligible for Rookie of the Year

== Schedule ==
Round	Title	Circuit	Location	Date	Winner	Car
1	O'Reilly Auto Parts Streets of Long Beach; Presented by Permatex	(California) Streets of Long Beach	Long Beach, California	April 7	(Norway) Fredric Aasbø	Toyota Corolla (E210)
2	Advance Auto Parts Scorched; Presented by Fast Orange	(Florida) Orlando Speedworld	Orlando, Florida	April 28	(United States) Chris Forsberg	Nissan 370Z
3	NAPA Auto Parts Road to the Championship; Presented by Rain-X	(Georgia (U.S. state)) Road Atlanta	Braselton, Georgia	May 12	(Latvia) Kristaps Blušs	BMW M3 E92
4	Advance Auto Parts The Gauntlet; Presented by Black Magic	(New Jersey) Wall Speedway	Wall Township, New Jersey	June 2	(Republic of Ireland) James Deane	Nissan Silvia S15
5	AutoZone Throwdown; Presented by Rain-X	(Washington (state)) Evergreen Speedway	Monroe, Washington	July 21	(Republic of Ireland) James Deane	Nissan Silvia S15
6	Advance Auto Parts Crossroads; Presented by Rain-X	(Illinois) Gateway Motorsports Park	Madison, Illinois	August 11	(Norway) Fredric Aasbø	Toyota Corolla (E210)
7	AutoZone Showdown; Presented by Rain-X	Texas Motor Speedway	Fort Worth, Texas	September 15	(Poland) Piotr Więcek	Nissan Silvia S15
8	O'Reilly Auto Parts Title Fight; Presented by Rain-X	(California) Irwindale Speedway	Irwindale, California	October 13	(United States) Vaughn Gittin, Jr.	Ford Mustang RTR

== Championship standings ==
=== Scoring system ===
Points were awarded for qualifying and for the main event. During qualifying, drivers performed solo runs which were judged on parameters such as line, angle, fluidity and commitment and assigned a numerical score up to 100. These scores were then ranked to determine the qualifying classification and hence populate the brackets for the competition phase. Up to 7 points were then awarded for the top 32 qualifiers.

The qualifiers proceed through a series of competition heats, with those eliminated in the first round (Top 32) receiving 16 points, the second round (Sweet 16) receiving 32 points, the third round (Great 8) receiving 48 points, and the fourth round (Final Four) receiving 64 points and classifying 3rd and 4th. Of the two drivers eliminated in the Final Four, the driver who qualified highest is awarded third place and the final step on the podium. In the Final, the runner-up receives 80 points and the winner 100 points. Final classification within each round is then determined by highest qualifying position; for example, of the two drivers eliminated in the Final Four, the driver who qualified higher is awarded 3rd position and the final place on the podium.

==== Qualifying stage ====
Position	1st	2nd	3rd	4th–8th	9th–16th	17th–32nd
Points	7	6	5	4	3	2

==== Competition stage ====
Position	1st	2nd	3rd	4th	5th–8th	9th–16th	17th–32nd
Points	100	80	64	64	48	32	16

=== Pro Championship standings ===
Pos	Driver	LBH	ORL	ATL	WNJ	EVS	GAT	TEX	IRW	Points
1	(Republic of Ireland) James Deane	4^{2}	2^{2}	6^{4}	1^{3}	1^{4}	6^{5}	**2^{1}**	**9^{1}**	595
2	(Norway) Fredric Aasbø	1^{5}	**3^{1}**	2^{3}	9^{4}	9^{5}	**1^{1}**	3^{4}	2^{4}	591
3	(Poland) Piotr Więcek	**3^{1}**	6^{4}	4^{8}	13^{14}	**3^{1}**	4^{13}	1^{3}	10^{2}	507
4	(United States) Chris Forsberg	6^{6}	1^{12}	3^{7}	5^{9}	17^{11}	8^{9}	14^{13}	17^{7}	399
5	(United States) Justin Pawlak	5^{4}	5^{3}	**9^{1}**	**3^{1}**	4^{3}	7^{7}	11^{7}	18^{13}	391
6	(United States) Ryan Tuerck	7^{8}	4^{6}	16^{20}	12^{12}	2^{7}	18^{12}	5^{5}	11^{5}	380
7	(United States) Matt Field	9^{7}	10^{10}	14^{15}	2^{5}	7^{12}	2^{2}	16^{19}	19^{17}	379
8	(United States) Chelsea DeNofa	11^{11}	19^{18}	7^{6}	26^{25}	11^{8}	3^{6}	4^{10}	3^{11}	361
9	(Lithuania) Aurimas Bakchis	13^{13}	7^{7}	10^{9}	4^{2}	10^{6}	9^{4}	12^{8}	8^{15}	351
10	(Japan) Daijiro Yoshihara	10^{9}	9^{9}	5^{2}	6^{10}	12^{10}	11^{10}	6^{9}	5^{3}	349
11	(Japan) Ken Gushi	18^{17}	8^{8}	8^{17}	7^{11}	13^{13}	5^{3}	15^{17}	6^{8}	345
12	(United States) Forrest Wang	2^{3}	14^{15}	13^{12}	8^{13}	DNQ	13^{15}	10^{6}	4^{16}	344
13	(United States) Vaughn Gittin, Jr.	16^{19}	22^{21}	17^{13}	10^{7}	16^{19}	15^{21}	7^{11}	1^{10}	329
14	(Latvia) Kristaps Blušs	12^{12}	11^{11}	1^{5}	16^{27}	5^{2}	12^{14}	24^{24}		315
15	(United States) Alec Hohnadell	8^{10}	17^{5}	12^{11}	15^{16}	18^{14}	17^{11}	9^{2}	13^{9}	252
16	(United States) Michael Essa	14^{15}	18^{17}	11^{10}	17^{6}	19^{16}	10^{8}	20^{20}	12^{6}	217
17	(United States) Matt Coffman	15^{16}	21^{20}	19^{16}	22^{21}	8^{22}	19^{16}	23^{23}	16^{26}	211
18	(Dominican Republic) Jhonnattan Castro	19^{18}	16^{28}	18^{14}	19^{18}	20^{18}	14^{17}	17^{14}	15^{20}	194
19	(United States) Jeff Jones	26^{26}	24^{23}	21^{21}	28^{28}	15^{17}	16^{22}	13^{12}	21^{19}	193
20	(United States) Dirk Stratton RY	17^{14}	12^{13}	20^{18}	24^{23}	24^{24}	27^{27}	18^{16}	14^{14}	180
21	(United States) Matt Vankirk R	28^{28}	15^{16}	24^{24}	14^{15}	27^{27}	24^{24}	22^{22}	24^{23}	178
22	(United States) Dan Burkett	20^{20}	25^{24}	15^{19}	25^{24}	21^{20}	25^{25}	21^{21}	20^{18}	160
23	(Republic of Ireland) Dean Kearney		13^{14}	23^{23}	21^{20}	22^{21}	22^{20}	DNQ	7^{12}	158
24	(Japan) Kazuya Taguchi R	30^{30}	23^{22}	27^{27}	30^{30}	25^{25}	21^{19}	19^{18}	22^{21}	144
25	(Italy) Federico Sceriffo	22^{22}	30^{30}	DNQ	23^{22}	28^{28}	23^{23}	26^{26}	25^{24}	126
26	(United States) Kyle Mohan	24^{24}	26^{25}	25^{25}	18^{17}	29^{29}	26^{26}	29^{29}	DNQ	126
27	(United States) Kevin Lawrence	27^{27}	27^{26}	28^{28}	27^{26}	23^{23}	20^{18}	30^{30}	DNQ	126
28	(Peru) Alex Heilbrunn	21^{21}	20^{19}	DNQ	11^{8}	6^{9}	DNQ			123
29	(Turkey) (Poland) Faruk Kugay	23^{23}	28^{27}	DNQ	29^{29}	26^{26}		27^{27}	27^{27}	108
30	(United States) Austin Meeks	25^{25}	29^{29}	22^{22}	DNQ	DNQ	28^{28}	28^{28}	26^{25}	108
31	(United States) Taylor Hull		DNQ	26^{26}		30^{30}	29^{29}	25^{25}	23^{22}	90
32	(United States) Ryan Litteral			DNQ	20^{19}		DNQ	8^{15}	DNQ	69
33	(United States) Cameron Moore	29^{29}		DNQ		14^{15}				53

**In-line notation**
^{Superscript number}	Qualifying position
**Bold**	Top qualifier
RY	Rookie of the Year
R	Rookie

=== Auto Cup standings ===
Auto Cup points are awarded each round to the two drivers with the highest classified finish for each manufacturer. To be eligible, both the chassis and engine must have been constructed by that manufacturer.

Pos	Manufacturer	LBH	ORL	ATL	WNJ	EVS	GAT	TEX	IRW	Pts
1	(Japan) Nissan	2^{3}	1^{12}	3^{7}	1^{3}	1^{4}	4^{13}	1^{3}	4^{16}	1229
1	(Japan) Nissan	**3^{1}**	2^{2}	4^{8}	5^{9}	**3^{1}**	6^{5}	**2^{1}**	**9^{1}**	1229
2	(Japan) Toyota	1^{5}	**3^{1}**	2^{3}	7^{11}	2^{7}	**1^{1}**	3^{4}	2^{4}	1053
2	(Japan) Toyota	7^{8}	4^{6}	8^{17}	9^{4}	9^{5}	5^{3}	5^{5}	6^{8}	1053
3	(United States) Ford	5^{4}	5^{3}	7^{6}	**3^{1}**	4^{3}	3^{6}	4^{10}	1^{10}	869
3	(United States) Ford	11^{11}	19^{18}	**9^{1}**	10^{7}	11^{8}	7^{7}	7^{11}	3^{11}	869
4	(Germany) BMW	12^{12}	11^{11}	1^{5}	11^{8}	5^{2}	10^{8}	20^{20}	12^{6}	598
4	(Germany) BMW	14^{15}	18^{17}	11^{10}	16^{27}	6^{9}	12^{14}	24^{24}	27^{27}	598
5	(United States) Chevrolet	9^{7}	10^{10}	14^{15}	2^{5}	7^{12}	2^{2}	16^{19}	14^{14}	559
5	(United States) Chevrolet	17^{14}	12^{13}	20^{18}	24^{23}	24^{24}	27^{27}	18^{16}	19^{17}	559
6	(United States) Dodge		13^{14}	23^{23}	21^{20} (Note: Kearney competed in a Nissan Silvia S15 in New Jersey, but his points were still added to Dodge's tally in the Auto Cup.)	22^{21}	22^{20}	DNQ	7^{12}	158
7	(Japan) Mazda	24^{24}	26^{25}	25^{25}	18^{17}	29^{29}	26^{26}	29^{29}	DNQ	126
8	(Italy) Ferrari	22^{22}	30^{30}	DNQ	23^{22}	28^{28}	23^{23}	26^{26}	25^{24}	126
9	(United States) Cadillac		DNQ	26^{26}		30^{30}	29^{29}	25^{25}	23^{22}	90

=== Tire Cup standings ===
Tire Cup points are awarded each round to the two drivers with the highest classified finish for each tire manufacturer.

Pos	Tire	LBH	ORL	ATL	WNJ	EVS	GAT	TEX	IRW	Pts
1	(Japan) Falken	**3^{1}**	2^{2}	4^{8}	1^{3}	1^{4}	2^{2}	1^{3}	5^{3}	1215
1	(Japan) Falken	4^{2}	5^{3}	5^{2}	2^{5}	**3^{1}**	4^{13}	**2^{1}**	8^{15}	1215
2	(South Korea) Nexen	1^{5}	1^{12}	2^{3}	5^{9}	2^{7}	**1^{1}**	3^{4}	2^{4}	1088
2	(South Korea) Nexen	6^{6}	3^{7}	**3^{1}**	9^{4}	9^{5}	8^{9}	5^{5}	11^{5}	1088
3	(Indonesia) Achilles	2^{3}	8^{8}	1^{5}	7^{11}	5^{2}	5^{3}	10^{6}	4^{16}	845
3	(Indonesia) Achilles	12^{12}	11^{11}	8^{17}	8^{13}	8^{22}	10^{8}	15^{17}	6^{8}	845
4	(Japan) Nitto	11^{11}	19^{18}	7^{6}	10^{7}	6^{9}	3^{6}	4^{10}	1^{10}	725
4	(Japan) Nitto	16^{19}	20^{19}	17^{13}	11^{8}	11^{8}	15^{21}	7^{11}	3^{11}	725
