= 2024 Formula Drift season =

Motorsport season

The 2024 Formula Drift season (officially titled and stylized as the Formula DRIFT PRO Championship) is the twenty-first season of the Formula D series. The season began on April 13 at Long Beach and concluded on October 19 at Irwindale Speedway after eight events.

This is the last Formula Drift season to feature the final event at Irwindale Speedway, after the track's announced permanent closure on October 29, 2024. The season finale at Irwindale had been held since Formula D's inception in 2004.

== Entries ==
Team	No.	Car	Tires	Driver	Round(s)
ASM	8	BMW M3 E46	GT Radial	(United States) Robert Thorne	All
Asphalt Anarchy	82	Chevrolet Corvette C6	Kenda	(United States) Taylor Hull	All
Beechum Racing	999	BMW M3 E46	Nexen	(United States) Trenton Beechum	All
Cash Racing	16	Cadillac XLR	Kenda	(United States) Jonathan Hurst	All
Diego Higa racing team	169	Toyota GT86	GT Radial	(Brazil) Diego Higa	All
Drift Cave Motorsports	777	Chevrolet Corvette C6	GT Radial	(United States) Matt Field	All
DRIFTING DEPARTMENT 17	117	Ferrari 599 GTB Fiorano	Nexen	(Italy) Federico Sceriffo	All
Extreme SimRacing	357	Chevrolet Corvette C7 Z06	GT Radial	(Brazil) João Barion	All
Feal Suspension Race Team	707	Nissan Silvia "S14.9"	GT Radial	(Norway) Simen Olsen	All
Feal Suspension Race Team	723	Nissan Silvia S15	GT Radial	(Lithuania) Aurimas Bakchis	All
Forsberg Racing	64	Nissan Z	GT Radial	(United States) Chris Forsberg	All
Garagistic	171	BMW 1 Series E82	Vitour	(United States) Rome Charpentier	All
Get Nuts Lab.	808	Nissan Silvia S15	Vitour	(United States) Forrest Wang	All
Hateley Motorsports	98	BMW M3 E46	Kumho	(United States) Andy Hateley R	All
Jeff Jones Racing	818	Nissan 370Z	Kumho	(United States) Jeff Jones	All
Jerry Yang Racing	123	Toyota GT86	GT Radial	(Japan) Kazuya Taguchi	All
Jerry Yang Racing	168	Toyota GT86	GT Radial	(Japan) Hiroya Minowa R	All
Jhonnattan Castro Racing	17	Toyota GR86	Kenda	(Dominican Republic) Jhonnattan Castro	All
Kyle Mohan Racing	99	Mazda RX-8	Vitour	(United States) Kyle Mohan	All
LZMFG	5	BMW M3 E36	Nitto	(United States) Adam LZ	?
MspeK Performance	527	Nissan Silvia "S14.9"	Vitour	(United States) Daniel Stuke	All
Noback Racing Co.	54	BMW M3 E46	Kenda	(United States) Nick Noback	All
Papadakis Racing	151	Toyota GR Supra	Nitto	(Norway) Fredric Aasbø	All
Papadakis Racing	411	Toyota GR Corolla	Nitto	(United States) Ryan Tuerck	All
Power Racing	919	Nissan Silvia S15	Nexen	(United States) Mike Power	All
RAD Industries	34	Toyota Supra A80	GT Radial	(United States) Dan Burkett	All
Robbins Race Co.	35	Nissan 350Z	Kenda	(United States) Alec Robbins	All
RTR Vehicles' Drift Team	25	Ford Mustang RTR Spec 5-FD	Nitto	(United States) Vaughn Gittin, Jr.	?
RTR Vehicles' Drift Team	130	Ford Mustang RTR Spec 5-FD	Nitto	(Republic of Ireland) James Deane	All
RTR Vehicles' Drift Team	213	Ford Mustang RTR Spec 5-FD	Nitto	(United States) Ben Hobson R	All
Ryan Litteral Racing	909	Nissan Silvia S15	Kenda	(United States) Ryan Litteral	All
Shanahan 79	79	BMW M3 E36	Vitour	(Republic of Ireland) Conor Shanahan R	1, 3–8
Sorensen Motorsports	513	BMW M3 E92	Nitto	(United States) Branden Sorensen	All
Team Hansen Drifting	119	Nissan 240SX S13	GT Radial	(United States) Rudy Hansen R	All
Team Infamous	27	Nissan Silvia S14	Kenda	(United States) Derek Madison	All
Team Karnage	43	Dodge Viper ZB II	Kumho	(Republic of Ireland) Dean Kearney	All
Team Never Settle	85	BMW M3 E46	Vitour	(United States) (Belarus) Dmitriy Brutskiy	All
Three's Racing	21	Toyota GR86	Kenda	(Japan) Ken Gushi	All
Whip Racing	129	BMW M3 E46	GT Radial	(United States) Dylan Hughes	All

R Eligible for Rookie of the Year

=== Driver changes ===
- 2023 PRO champion Chelsea DeNofa retired from the series, announcing his intention ahead of the final round in 2023. His seat at RTR Motorsports was taken by 2023 PROSPEC champion Ben Hobson.
- 2023 PROSPEC runner-up Andy Hateley made his Formula Drift PRO debut.
- Hiroya Minowa joined Jerry Yang Racing with support from GT Radial Tires. At the start of the season, he was just 14 years old.
- After 2 seasons driving for RTR Motorsports, Adam LZ entered his own team running a single BMW E36. LZMFG only competed part-time in their debut FD season in order to run a full DMEC programme for 2024.
- Two-time PROSPEC champion Dmitriy Brutskiy moved up to the PRO series.
- Rudy Hansen moved up from the PROSPEC series, where he finished third in 2023.
- 2022 PROSPEC runner-up Derek Madison moved up to the PRO series.
- 2023 Drift Masters European Champion Conor Shanahan joined the series alongside defending his DMEC title. He will miss the second round at Road Atlanta due to a calendar clash with DMEC.
- Travis Reeder elected not to compete in the 2024 season.

=== Other changes ===
- GT Radial, winners of the Tire Cup in 2023, renewed their partnership with the series for a further three years.
- Kumho entered the series as an official tire sponsor for 2024 and beyond.

== Schedule ==
Round	Title	Circuit	Location	Date	Winner	Car
1	Streets of Long Beach	(California) Streets of Long Beach	Long Beach, California	April 13	(Republic of Ireland) James Deane	Ford Mustang RTR Spec 5-FD
2	Road to the Championship	(Georgia (U.S. state)) Road Atlanta	Braselton, Georgia	May 11	(Norway) Fredric Aasbø	Toyota GR Supra
3	Scorched	(Florida) Orlando Speed World	Orlando, Florida	June 1	(Republic of Ireland) Conor Shanahan	BMW M3 E36
4	The Gauntlet	(New Jersey) Englishtown Raceway Park	Englishtown, New Jersey	June 22	(Republic of Ireland) James Deane	Ford Mustang RTR Spec 5-FD
5	Crossroads	(Missouri) World Wide Technology Raceway	St. Louis, Missouri	July 20	(Republic of Ireland) James Deane	Ford Mustang RTR Spec 5-FD
6	Throwdown	(Washington (state)) Evergreen Speedway	Monroe, Washington	August 10	(United States) Ryan Tuerck	Toyota GR Corolla
7	Elevated	Utah Motorsports Campus	Grantsville, Utah	August 30	(Lithuania) Aurimas Bakchis	Nissan Silvia S15
8	Title Fight	(California) Irwindale Speedway	Irwindale, California	October 19	(Republic of Ireland) James Deane	Ford Mustang RTR Spec 5-FD

== Championship standings ==
Pre-event qualifying was eliminated starting in 2024, so that all results across the weekend are determined by tandem drifting and not by solo runs.

The 24 highest classified drivers in the previous event are guaranteed a starting position at the next event and are seeded with the same results, so that the previous event winner is awarded the number 1 seed (equivalent to the top qualifier in previous seasons).

The remaining 8 seeding positions (25th through 32nd) are contested by up to 24 other drivers, including those who finished 25th or below in the previous round. Seeding within this group is determined by a Seeding Bracket, a knockout-style tandem drift competition of similar format to the main event, with the first-place finisher being awarded the 25th starting position in the main event. All drivers score championship points; those eliminated during the Seeding Bracket are classified 33rd through 48th and receive 14 points.

In the main event, drivers proceed through a series of competition heats, with those eliminated in the first round (Top 32) receiving 28 points and classifying 17th through 32nd, the second round (Top 16) receiving 42 points and classifying 9th through 16th, the third round (Great 8) receiving 56 points and classifying 5th through 8th, and the fourth round (Final Four) classifying 3rd and 4th, both receiving 70 points. In the Final, the runner-up receives 84 points and the winner 100 points. Final classification within each round is then determined by highest seeding position; for example, of the two drivers eliminated in the Final Four, the driver who was seeded higher entering the event is awarded 3rd position and the final place on the podium.

In the event of a tie on points, the driver who classified higher in the most recent round will be awarded the higher position.

For Round 1 at Long Beach, the final classification of the 2023 championship was used, with non-returning drivers Chelsea DeNofa (1st) and Kristaps Blušs (24th) skipped and the ranking reapplied so that Taylor Hull (25th) and Alec Robbins (26th) were seeded 23rd and 24th respectively, and guaranteed starting positions.

=== Competition stage ===
Position	1st	2nd	3rd	4th	5th–8th	9th–16th	17th–32nd	33rd–48th
Points	100	84	70	70	56	42	28	14

=== Pro Championship standings ===
Pos	Driver	LBH	ATL	ORL	ENG	WWT	EVS	UTA	IRW	Pts
1	(Republic of Ireland) James Deane	1	3	2	1	1	9	4	1	666
2	(Lithuania) Aurimas Bakchis	3	4	5	2	5	5	1	3	562
3	(Norway) Fredric Aasbø	5	1	17	7	3	10	2	2	520
4	(Japan) Hiroya Minowa RY	8	18	4	11	2	2	10	11	448
5	(United States) Adam LZ	24	25	8	3	6	3	11	8	406
6	(United States) Ryan Tuerck	10	19	12	13	13	1	9	7	394
7	(United States) Matt Field	9	6	6	12	4	11	13	12	392
8	(Republic of Ireland) Conor Shanahan R	25		1	9	8	12	14	4	380
9	(United States) Dylan Hughes	17	13	11	4	7	17	7	6	378
10	(United States) Branden Sorensen	14	12	3	10	12	13	15	13	364
11	(Norway) Simen Olsen	2	2	9	18	16	22	23	24	364
12	(United States) Jeff Jones	30	16	24	15	17	4	5	5	350
13	(United States) Chris Forsberg	11	10	10	5	9	18	8	10	350
14	(Japan) Ken Gushi	4	9	20	8	11	20	21	15	336
15	(United States) Jonathan Hurst	13	20	25	16	15	14	6	9	322
16	(United States) Trenton Beechum	16	22	13	19	19	6	3	17	322
17	(United States) Rome Charpentier	6	5	18	14	14	21	22	23	308
18	(Japan) Kazuya Taguchi	12	11	21	23	23	7	12	18	294
19	(Dominican Republic) Jhonnattan Castro	18	14	22	24	24	8	17	14	280
20	(United States) Taylor Hull	22	24	14	6	10	19	20	22	280
21	(United States) Nick Noback	7	17	7	17	18	23	24	25	280
22	(United States) Dan Burkett	26	8	19	22	22	15	18	20	266
23	(United States) Alec Robbins	23	15	23	25	34	16	19	21	238
24	(United States) Daniel Stuke	21	23	27	32	26	29	30	30	224
25	(Brazil) Diego Higa	29	26	16	21	21	25	28	35	224
26	(United States) Robert Thorne	15	21	26	36	28	27	34	26	210
27	(United States) Ryan Litteral		30	15	20	20	24	25	33	196
28	(Italy) Federico Sceriffo	27	35	34	28	36	31	32 (Note: Only 31 drivers qualified for the main event at Utah. Sceriffo was the highest-qualified driver eliminated during the Seeding 16, earning 32nd place but 14 points.)	16	182
29	(United States) Andy Hateley	34	32	29	27	35	35	16	19	182
30	(United States) Kyle Mohan	33	28	36	31	32	30	31	28	182
31	(United States) Rudy Hansen R	28	36	31	34	33	33	27	31	168
32	(United States) (Belarus) Dmitriy Brutskiy	37	29	28	26	25	34	33	32 (Note: Only 31 drivers qualified for the main event at Irwindale. Brutskiy was the highest-qualified driver eliminated during the Seeding 16, earning 32nd place but 14 points.)	168
33	(United States) Derek Madison	36	34	30	33	29	28	29	36	168
34	(United States) Forrest Wang	20	7				32 (Note: Forrest Wang received a bye run in the Seeding 16 at Seattle, but hit the wall and was unable to complete the run. He still advanced into the main event but only received 14 points instead of 28.)		27	126
35	(United States) Ben Hobson R	35	33	33	35	30	WD	26	34	126
36	(United States) Mike Power	32		35	30	27	26			112
37	(Brazil) João Barion	31	27	32	29	31				98
38	(United States) Vaughn Gittin, Jr.		31						29	56
39	(Republic of Ireland) Dean Kearney	19								28

In-line notation
RY	Rookie of the Year
R	Rookie

=== Auto Cup standings ===
Auto Cup points are awarded each round to the two drivers with the highest classified finish for each manufacturer. To be eligible, both the chassis and engine must have been constructed by that manufacturer.

General Motors initially earned contributions from Chevrolet and Cadillac, but Cadillac were granted their own classification during the season and the points were adjusted.

Pos	Manufacturer	LBH	ATL	ORL	ENG	WWT	EVS	UTA	IRW	Pts
1	(Japan) Toyota	4	1	12	7	3	1	2		872
1	(Japan) Toyota	5	9	16	8	11	8	9		872
2	(United States) Ford	1	3	2	1	1	9	4		692
2	(United States) Ford	35	31	33	33	30	WD	26		692
3	(United States) General Motors	9	6	6	6	4	11	13		602
3	(United States) General Motors	22	24	14	12	10	19	20		602
4	(Japan) Nissan	11	10	10	5	9	18	8		490
4	(Japan) Nissan		30	15	20	20	24	25		490
5	(Germany) BMW	6	5	18	14	14	21	22		434
5	(Germany) BMW	37	29	28	26	25	34	33		434
6	(United States) Cadillac	13	20	25	16	15	14	6		280
7	(Japan) Mazda	33	28	36	31	32	30	31		154
8	(Italy) Ferrari	27	35	34	28	36	31	32		140
9	(United States) Dodge	19								28

=== Tire Cup standings ===
Tire Cup points are awarded each round to the two drivers with the highest classified finish for each tire manufacturer.

Pos	Tire	LBH	ATL	ORL	ENG	WWT	EVS	UTA	IRW	Pts
1	(Japan) Nitto	1	1	2	1	1	1	2		1102
1	(Japan) Nitto	5	3	3	7	3	9	4		1102
2	(Singapore) GT Radial	2	2	4	2	2	2	1		1038
2	(Singapore) GT Radial	3	4	5	4	4	5	7		1038
3	(Chinese Taipei) Kenda	4	9	7	6	10	8	6		686
3	(Chinese Taipei) Kenda	7	14	14	8	11	14	17		686
4	(China) Vitour	6	5	1	9	8	12	14		646
4	(China) Vitour	20	7	18	14	14	21	22		646
6	(South Korea) Kumho	19	16	24	15	17	4	5		462
6	(South Korea) Kumho	30	32	29	27	35	35	16		462
5	(South Korea) Nexen	16	22	13	19	19	6	3		448
5	(South Korea) Nexen	27	35	34	28	27	26	32		448
