= 2025 Formula Drift season =

Motorsport season

The 2025 Formula Drift season (officially titled and stylized as the Formula DRIFT PRO Championship) was the twenty-second season of the Formula D series. The season began on April 4 at Long Beach and concluded on October 18, also at Long Beach.

This was the first Formula Drift season in its 22-year history to not feature a final event at Irwindale Speedway after the track's announced permanent closure on October 29, 2024.

== Entries ==
Team	No.	Car	Tires	Driver	Round(s)
Austin Matta Motorsports	710	Nissan Silvia S14	Kenda	(United States) Austin Matta R	All
Beechum Racing	999	BMW M3 E46	Kumho	(United States) Trenton Beechum	All
Cash Racing	16	Cadillac XLR	Kenda	(United States) Jonathan Hurst	All
Drift Cave Motorsports	777	Chevrolet Corvette C6	GT Radial	(United States) Matt Field	All
Drifting Department 17	117	Ferrari 599 GTB Fiorano	Nitto	(Italy) Federico Sceriffo	All
Feal Suspension Race Team	723	Nissan Silvia S15	GT Radial	(Lithuania) Aurimas Bakchis	All
Forsberg Racing	64	Nissan Z	Kumho	(United States) Chris Forsberg	All
Garagistic Racing	171	BMW 1 Series E82	Kumho	(United States) Rome Charpentier	All
Jeff Jones Racing	818	Nissan 370Z	Kumho	(United States) Jeff Jones	All
Jerry Yang Racing	168	Toyota GT86	GT Radial	(Japan) Hiroya Minowa	All
Jerry Yang Racing	87	Toyota GR86	GT Radial	(Japan) Daigo Saito	1-4
Jerry Yang Racing	530	Toyota GR86	GT Radial	(Japan) Wataru Masuyama	6-8
Jhonnatan Castro Racing	17	Toyota GR86	Kenda	(Dominican Republic) Jhonnattan Castro	All
KGMS Toyota Gazoo Racing Greddy Performance with Kenda	21	Toyota GR86	Kenda	(Japan) Ken Gushi	All
LZMFG	5	BMW M3 E36	GT Radial	(United States) Adam LZ	All
MspeK Performance	527	Nissan Silvia "S14.9"	Kenda	(United States) Daniel Stuke	All
Never Settle	85	BMW M3 E46	GT Radial	(United States) (Belarus) Dmitriy Brutskiy	All
Noback Racing	54	BMW M3 E46	Kenda	(United States) Nick Noback	All
O'Sully Racing US Army	107	BMW E46	GT Radial	(United States) Connor O'Sullivan R	All
Papadakis Racing	151	Toyota GR Supra	Kenda	(Norway) Fredric Aasbø	All
Papadakis Racing	411	Toyota GR Corolla	Kenda	(United States) Ryan Tuerck	All
RAD Industries	34	Toyota Supra MK IV	GT Radial	(United States) Dan Burkett	All
RTR Vehicles' Drift Team	130	Ford Mustang RTR Spec 5-FD	Nitto	(Republic of Ireland) James Deane	All
RTR Vehicles' Drift Team	25	Ford Mustang RTR Spec 5-FD	Nitto	(United States) Vaughn Gittin, Jr.	?
RTR Vehicles' Drift Team	213	Ford Mustang RTR Spec 5-FD	Nitto	(United States) Ben Hobson	All
Ryan Litteral Racing	909	Nissan Silvia S15	Kumho	(United States) Ryan Litteral	All
Shanahan Seventy Nine	79	Toyota GT86	GT Radial	(Republic of Ireland) Conor Shanahan	All
Simen Olsen Drifting	707	Toyota GR Supra	Kenda	(Norway) Simen Olsen	All
Sorensen Motorsports	513	BMW M3 E92	Nitto	(United States) Branden Sorensen	All
TLO Drift Team	233	Chevrolet Corvette C7	Kumho	(Canada) Tommy Lemaire R	All
Team DHR	129	BMW M3 E46	GT Radial	(United States) Dylan Hughes	All
Team Drift Wizard	98	BMW M3 E46	Kumho	(United States) Andy Hateley	All
Team Hansen Drifting	119	Nissan 240SX S13	GT Radial	(United States) Rudy Hansen	All
Team Infamous	27	Nissan Silvia S14	Kenda	(United States) Derek Madison	All
59 Racing	59	BMW 1 Series E82	Kumho	(Republic of Ireland) Jack Shanahan R	All

R Eligible for Rookie of the Year

=== Driver Changes ===
- Former Drift Masters runner-up and champion of the Russian Drift Series and British Drift Championship, Jack Shanahan, joined the series driving a BMW 1 Series E82.
- 2011 Formula Drift champion Daigo Saito returned to the series after 11 years, joining Jerry Yang Racing.
- 2024 PROSPEC champion Tommy Lemaire moved up to PRO.
- Connor O'Sullivan, the 2024 PROSPEC runner-up, also advanced to PRO.
- Austin Matta, who finished third in PROSPEC in 2024, moved up to PRO as well.
- Luke Fink had planned to compete in the series but was forced to withdraw due to various issues with sponsors and car parts.
- Mike Power, Forrest Wang, Alec Robbins, Robert Thorne, and Taylor Hull all elected not to compete in 2025 for various reasons.
- Kyle Mohan also chose to sit out the season, stating that he is focusing on developing the car for a 2026 return
- Daigo Saito faced visa issues during the season and had to withdraw from the championship. He was replaced by Wataru Masuyama.

=== Other Changes ===
- Vitour and Nexen left the series.

== Schedule ==
Round	Title	Circuit	Location	Date	Winner	Car
1	Streets of Long Beach	(California) Streets of Long Beach	Long Beach, California	April 4	(Norway) Fredric Aasbo	(Japan) Toyota GR Supra
2	Road to the Championship	(Georgia (U.S. state)) Road Atlanta	Braselton, Georgia	May 8	(Republic of Ireland) James Deane	(United States) Ford Mustang RTR Spec 5-FD
3	Scorched	(Florida) Orlando Speed World	Orlando, Florida	May 30	(Japan) Hiroya Minowa	(Japan) Toyota GT86
4	The Gauntlet	(New Jersey) Englishtown Raceway Park	Englishtown, New Jersey	June 19	(United States) Adam LZ	(Germany) BMW E36
5	Crossroads	(Missouri) World Wide Technology Raceway	St. Louis, Missouri	July 17	(Republic of Ireland) James Deane	(United States) Ford Mustang RTR Spec 5-FD
6	Throwdown	(Washington (state)) Evergreen Speedway	Monroe, Washington	August 8	(United States) Matt Field	(United States) Chevrolet Corvette C6
7	Elevated	Utah Motorsports Campus	Grantsville, Utah	August 28	(Republic of Ireland) James Deane	(United States) Ford Mustang RTR Spec 5-FD
8	Shoreline Showdown	(California) Streets of Long Beach	Long Beach, California	October 17	(Republic of Ireland) Jack Shanahan	(Germany) BMW 1 Series E82

== Championship Standings ==
=== Scoring system ===
The 20 highest classified drivers in the previous event are guaranteed a starting position at the next event and are seeded with the same results, so that the previous event winner is awarded the number 1 seed. This may change if there are 32 or less drivers at the event. In such instance only the top 16 are locked in.

The remaining twelve seeding positions (21st through 32nd) are contested by up to 16 drivers, including those who finished 21st or lower in the previous round. Seeding within this group is determined by a Seeding Bracket, a knockout-style tandem drift competition similar in format to the main event. The winner of the Seeding Bracket is awarded the 21st starting position in the main event. If 32 or less drivers show up at the event, the drivers are contesting for places 17th through 32nd and drivers that finished 17th or lower at the previous event are included. Beginning in 2025, the series introduced a points system for the Seeding Bracket, awarding three points for each battle won. Consequently, the winner receives 12 points, finalists and Top 4 finishers receive nine points, while drivers eliminated in the Top 16 do not receive any points.

As in previous years, drivers in the main event advance through a series of competition heats. However, in 2025, points were awarded based on the number of battles won rather than the stage at which a driver was eliminated. Drivers received 10 points for each battle won, with the winner earning up to 50 points, potentially more if they also competed in the Seeding Bracket. Drivers eliminated in the Top 32 do not receive any points. The competition format didn't change, featuring progression through the Top 32, Top 16, Top 8, Top 4, and the Final. Final classification within each round is then determined by highest seeding position; for example, of the two drivers eliminated in Top 4, the driver who was seeded higher entering the event is awarded 3rd position and the final place on the podium.

In the event of a tie on points, the driver who classified higher in the most recent round will be awarded the higher position.

=== Seeding Bracket ===
Battles won	4	3	2		1	0
Position	1st	2nd	3rd	4th	5th–8th	9th–16th
Points	12	9	6	6	3	0

=== Competition Stage ===
Battles won	5	4	3		2	1	0	
Position	1st	2nd	3rd	4th	5th–8th	9th–16th	17th–32nd	33rd–48th
Points	50	40	30	30	20	10	0	0

=== Pro Championship standings ===
Pos	Driver	LBH	ATL	ORL	ENG	WWT	EVS	UTA	LBH2	Pts
1	(Republic of Ireland) James Deane	2	1	9	3	1	2			220
2	(Norway) Fredric Aasbø	1	2	5	2	3	18			180
3	(United States) Matt Field	10	8	4	7	6	1			150
4	(United States) Adam LZ	3	9	10	1	5	3			150
5	(Japan) Hiroya Minowa	9	7	1	5	10	6			130
6	(Dominican Republic) Jhonnattan Castro	14	4	2	9	19	4			120
7	(Lithuania) Aurimas Bakchis	5	3	3	6	17	22^{9}			109
8	(United States) Branden Sorensen	4	5	6	17	22	14^{12}			92
9	(United States) Dylan Hughes	11	12	12	12	4	5			90
10	(United States) Chris Forsberg	8	11	7	10	11	10			80
11	(Republic of Ireland) Jack Shanahan R	27^{3}	25^{3}	22^{12}	23^{12}	2^{6}	17			76
12	(United States) Ryan Tuerck	6	6	17	19	14	7			70
13	(United States) Rome Charpentier	20	16	8	11	7	9			70
14	(United States) Daniel Stuke	15^{12}	18	15	8	18	16			62
15	(Republic of Ireland) Conor Shanahan	7	10	11	18	13	12			60
16	(United States) Connor O'Sullivan R	30	22^{9}	33	4^{3}	9	20			52
17	(Canada) Tommy Lemaire R	28^{3}	29	25^{6}	16^{9}	12	11			48
18	(Japan) Ken Gushi	12	13	13	13	19	32			40
19	(United States) Derek Madison	25^{3}	23^{6}	16^{3}	15	21	24^{6}			38
20	(Norway) Simen Olsen	17	14	14	14	20	23^{6}			36
21	(United States) Trenton Beechum	13	17	19	21	15^{3}	13			33
22	(United States) Jeff Jones	18	15	18	20	8	19			30
23	(United States) Nick Noback	21	32	31	25^{6}	23^{12}	15			28
24	(United States) Rudy Hansen	26^{3}	24^{6}	28^{3}	27^{3}	25^{6}	25^{3}			24
25	(Japan) Wataru Masuyama						8^{3}			23
26	(United States) Andy Hateley	23^{6}	28^{3}	30	30	16	21			19
27	(United States) Ben Hobson	16^{9}	19	20	22	30	31			19
28	(United States) Dan Burkett	22	33	26^{3}	24^{6}	24^{9}	28			18
29	(United States) (Belarus) Dmitriy Brutskiy	24^{6}	34	27^{3}	26^{3}	26^{3}	29			15
30	(Italy) Federico Sceriffo	33	30	23^{9}	33	29	27^{3}			12
31	(United States) Austin Matta R	29	21^{12}	32	31	27	30			12
32	(Japan) Daigo Saito	31	26^{3}	24^{6}	28^{3}					12
33	(United States) Jonathan Hurst	19	20	21	32	28	26^{3}			3
34	(United States) Ryan Litteral	32	27^{3}	29	29					3
35	(United States) Vaughn Gittin, Jr.		31							0

In-line notation
RY	Rookie of the Year
R	Rookie
^{Superscript Number}	Seeding Bracket points

=== Auto Cup standings ===
Auto Cup points are awarded each round to the two drivers with the highest classified finish for each manufacturer. To be eligible, both the chassis and engine must have been constructed by that manufacturer.

Pos	Manufacturer	LBH	ATL	ORL	ENG	WWT	EVS	UTA	IRW	Pts
1	(Germany) BMW	20	16	8	11	2	9			341
1	(Germany) BMW	24	25	22	23	7	17			341
1	(Japan) Toyota	1	2	2	2	3	7			340
1	(Japan) Toyota	6	4	5	9	14	18			340
3	(Japan) Nissan	8	11	7	10	11	10			272
3	(Japan) Nissan	32	27	29	29					272
4	(United States) Ford	2	1	9	3	1	2			239
4	(United States) Ford	16	19	20	22	30	31			239
5	(United States) Chevrolet	10	8	4	7	6	1			195
5	(United States) Chevrolet		29	25	16	12	11			195
6	(Italy) Ferrari	33	30	23	33	29	27			12
7	(United States) Cadillac	19	20	21	32	28	26			3

=== Tire Cup standings ===
Tire Cup points are awarded each round to the two drivers with the highest classified finish for each tire manufacturer.

Pos	Tire	LBH	ATL	ORL	ENG	WWT	EVS	UTA	IRW	Pts
1	(Singapore) GT Radial	3	3	1	1	4	1			393
1	(Singapore) GT Radial	5	7	3	4	5	3			393
2	(Chinese Taipei) Kenda	1	2	2	2	3	4			354
2	(Chinese Taipei) Kenda	6	4	5	8	14	7			354
3	(Japan) Nitto	2	1	6	3	1	2			312
3	(Japan) Nitto	4	5	9	17	22	14			312
4	(South Korea) Kumho	8	11	7	10	2	9			178
4	(South Korea) Kumho	13	15	8	11	7	10			178
