= Tomoshige Mizutani =

Japanese business executive (born 1961)

Tomoshige "Tomo" Mizutani
- 水谷 友重
- Born: June 18, 1961 (age 65); Kobe, Hyogo Prefecture, Japan
- Education: Kobe University (School of Business Administration)
- Occupation: Business executive
- Title: Advisor, TOYO TIRE Corporation; Honorary Chairman, Toyo Tire Holdings of Americas Inc.
- Awards: Special Congressional Recognition for Outstanding Leadership (2013); International Citizen Award (2014); Tire Industry Hall of Fame (2025)

Tomoshige "Tomo" Mizutani (Japanese: 水谷友重; born June 18, 1961) is a Japanese business executive in the tire industry. He is an advisor to TOYO TIRE Corporation and honorary chairman of Toyo Tire Holdings of Americas Inc.

After beginning his career at Nissho Iwai Corporation, now Sojitz, Mizutani moved to the United States in 1992 to rebuild Nitto Tire's U.S. business. At the time, the operation had approximately $6 million in annual sales and $8 million in inventory. The business subsequently expanded to approximately $600 million in annual sales by 2018 and reached $1 billion by 2025.

In 2025, Mizutani was inducted into the Tire Industry Hall of Fame. He was reported to be the second Japanese person inducted, following Shojiro Ishibashi, founder of Bridgestone.

== Early life and education ==
Mizutani was born in Kobe, Hyogo Prefecture, Japan. He graduated from the School of Business Administration at Kobe University in 1984.

Following graduation, he joined Nissho Iwai Corporation, a Japanese general trading company that later became part of Sojitz Corporation. He was involved in the export of tires for mining operations and traveled to more than 30 countries during the early years of his career.

Mizutani has cited his supervisor Yoichi Nakashima at Nissho Iwai and Akihiro Amano, one of his professors at Kobe University, as influences on his professional development.

== Career ==
=== Nissho Iwai and Nitto Tire ===
In June 1992, Mizutani was assigned to the Nitto Division of Tire Masters Inc., a tire distributor acquired by Nissho Iwai, and relocated to the United States. He was tasked with rebuilding sales of the Nitto brand in the U.S. market. At the time, the Nitto operation was experiencing weak sales and excess inventory, and closure of the business had been considered.

Mizutani and his team focused on automotive enthusiasts, particularly younger consumers on the West Coast who modified Japanese cars and participated in drag racing and other forms of automotive culture. The company developed products aimed at this market and later expanded its use of digital marketing.

In 2000, after the sales rights for the Nitto brand were transferred from Nissho Iwai to Toyo Tire & Rubber Co., Ltd., now TOYO TIRE Corporation, Mizutani joined Toyo Tire.

He became president of Nitto Tire North America Inc., now Nitto Tire U.S.A. Inc., in 2005 and was appointed an executive officer of Toyo Tire & Rubber in 2011. He later held senior executive positions within the company's North American operations, including president of Toyo Tire Holdings of Americas Inc., president and chairman of Toyo Tire U.S.A. Corp., and chairman and CEO of Nitto Tire U.S.A. Inc.

In 2025, Mizutani became an advisor to TOYO TIRE Corporation and honorary chairman of Toyo Tire Holdings of Americas Inc.

== Marketing and business strategy ==
Mizutani advocated repositioning tires from what he described as a "negative purchase", a product consumers buy primarily because their existing tires have worn out, into a "positive purchase", in which consumers actively choose a tire because of its brand, design, or performance.

One of the products associated with Nitto's turnaround was a 245/35R20 large-diameter tire developed for automotive enthusiasts. Nitto also introduced tires with distinctive tread and sidewall designs, including the Mud Grappler. Its design concept was developed by Hiroaki Ichiki, a pioneer in Japan's off-road market, and drew inspiration from elements such as dinosaur bones and claws.

Mizutani also emphasized digital marketing as part of Nitto's U.S. strategy beginning around 2007. The brand's Facebook following reached approximately 3 million in 2013 and exceeded 12 million by 2018. By 2025, it had grown to more than 13 million followers.

== Speaking engagements ==
Mizutani has spoken about business strategy, leadership, and the development of Nitto Tire in the United States at universities and business organizations.

His speaking engagements have included the UCLA Anderson School of Management, USC Marshall School of Business, Pepperdine University, the University of California, Irvine, Chapman University, and events associated with Harvard Business School alumni organizations. He has also spoken to members of the United States Air Force in Nevada.

In 2015, he appeared as a speaker in the Harvard Leadership Series organized by the Harvard Business School Association of Orange County. He later spoke at Harvard Business School alumni events in New York and Dallas.

Mizutani has also participated in the D.K. Kim Foundation Lecture Series at Loyola Marymount University's College of Business Administration.

== Community involvement ==
Mizutani has supported community and educational organizations in the United States under the principle of giving back to the communities in which the company developed its business. His activities have included support for the Japanese American National Museum, veterans' organizations, and Discovery Cube, a nonprofit organization focused on science, technology, engineering, and mathematics education.

He has also been involved in a documentary project concerning the history of Japanese immigration to the United States.

== Leadership and succession ==
In 2016, Keiko Brockel succeeded Mizutani as president of Nitto Tire U.S.A. Inc. Brockel became the first woman to serve as president, and later CEO, of a tire company in the United States. Mizutani stated in an interview that the appointment reflected his approach of evaluating employees based on ability and performance.

== Positions ==
- 1984: Joined Nissho Iwai Corporation, now Sojitz Corporation.
- 1992: Joined the Nitto Division of Tire Masters Inc.
- 2000: Joined Toyo Tire & Rubber Co., Ltd., now TOYO TIRE Corporation.
- 2005: President, Nitto Tire North America Inc., now Nitto Tire U.S.A. Inc.
- 2011: Executive Officer, Toyo Tire & Rubber Co., Ltd.
- 2013: President, Toyo Tire Holdings of Americas Inc.
- 2014: President, Toyo Tire U.S.A. Corp.
- 2015: Managing Executive Officer, Toyo Tire & Rubber Co., Ltd.
- 2016: Chairman, Toyo Tire U.S.A. Corp.; chairman and CEO, Nitto Tire U.S.A. Inc.
- 2024: Senior Executive Officer, TOYO TIRE Corporation.
- 2025: Advisor, TOYO TIRE Corporation; Honorary Chairman, Toyo Tire Holdings of Americas Inc.

== Awards and honors ==
- 2013: Special Congressional Recognition for Outstanding Leadership, presented by U.S. Representative John Campbell.
- 2014: International Citizen Award, Japan America Society of Southern California.
- 2025: Tire Industry Hall of Fame.
