= James Deane (drift driver) =

Irish drift driver (born 1991)

- Nationality: Ireland
- Born: 14 October 1991 (age 35) Castletownroche, Ireland

Formula Drift career
- Current team: RTR Motorsports
- Car number: 130

Championship titles
- 2008, 2010 2008 2011, 2014, 2015, 2016 2013 2013, 2015 2017, 2018, 2019, 2024, 2025 2018, 2019, 2020, 2024 2018, 2019, 2020 2021: Prodrift Ireland; Prodrift European Series; Drift Allstars Nurburgring Drift Cup; Irish Drift Championship; Formula Drift Oman International Drift Championship; Drift Masters FIA Intercontinental Drifting Cup

James Deane (born 14 October 1991) is an Irish professional drifter. He is a five-time Formula Drift Champion, four-time Drift Allstars, three-time Drift Masters, and four-time Oman IDC Champion. He has also won multiple National and European titles. He is widely regarded as one of the greatest drift drivers of all time.

== Career ==
Deane began his career in competition drifting in 2006, driving, finishing third in the series. In 2007, Deane won his first ever professional event in the main Prodrift series at Rosegreen at the age of fifteen, which is believed to have made him the youngest professional drift event winner in the world at the time. The following season, he won both the Irish series and the Prodrift European series, qualifying him to compete in the Red Bull Drifting World Championship in Long Beach, California.

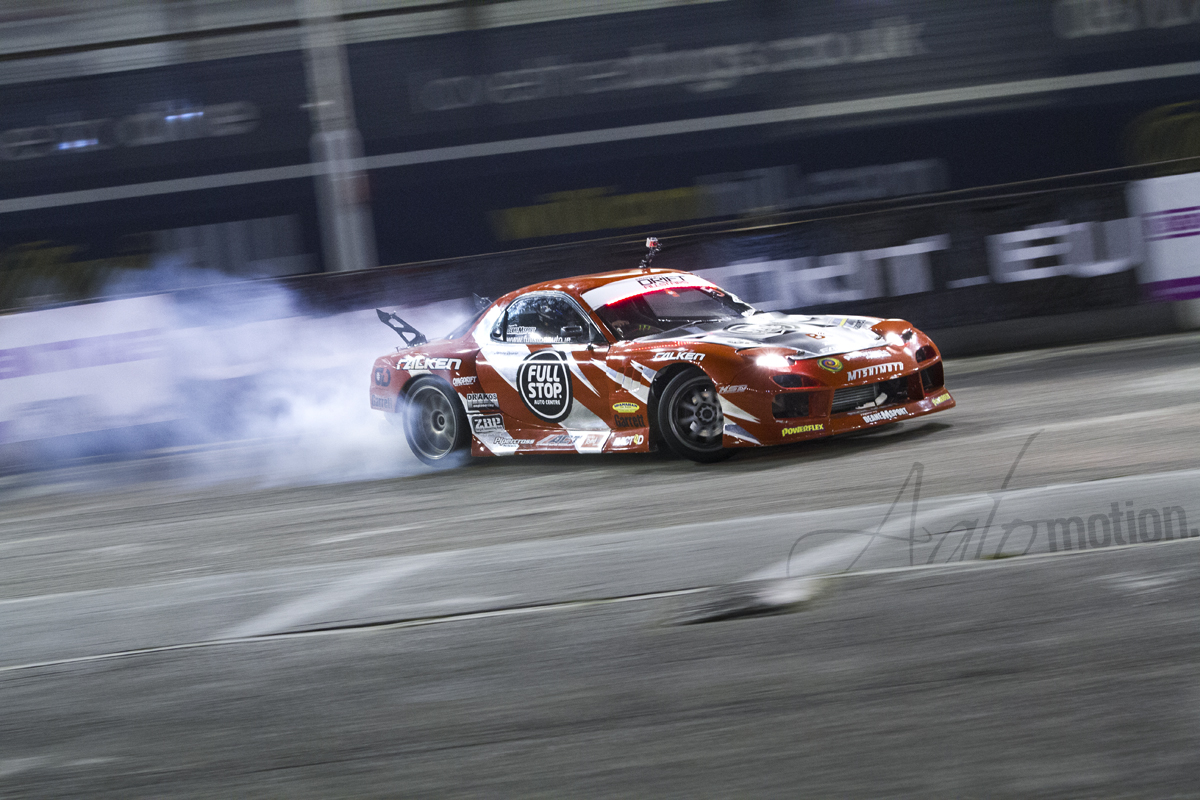
Deane drifting in 2012

Deane won the 2010 Prodrift series whilst also competing in some Formula Drift events. The following season, he won the Drift Allstars series for the Low Brain Drifters team, with six podiums including four wins. He won the Irish Drift Championship in 2013 and 2015 and from 2014 onwards, won the Drift Allstars European Series for three consecutive years.

Deane took first place on the podium at the 2019 Oman Oil Marketing International Drift Championship. Representing Worthouse and Falken, Deane dominated the bracket despite an issue he was having due to a flaw with the rack and pinion in his steering assembly. This win at the Oman Drift Championship gives Deane his thirteenth title win.

On 3 March 2021, Deane announced that he would be competing in the 2021 Russian Drift Series with the AIMOL Drift Team. He would compete alongside teammates Daigo Saito and Charles NG.

=== Formula Drift ===
In October 2016, following his third DA title, it was announced that Deane would return to Formula Drift for a full campaign in 2017. Deane would pilot a Toyota 2JZ powered Nissan Silvia S15 for the Worthouse drift team alongside teammate Piotr Wiecek. Wiecek would pilot an identical S15 converted to left hand drive. His return to competition in the United States was a major success, with him winning the 2017 Formula Drift Championship.

Deane returned to Formula Drift in 2018 alongside Worthouse. He finished the season in first place, successfully defending his title. This would make him the second driver in Formula Drift history to win back-to-back championships, the first being Tanner "The Golden Child" Foust.

Having successfully defended his Formula Drift Championship title, Deane returned for the 2019 season, which would prove to be Deane's toughest Formula Drift season since his return to the series in 2017. On 19 October 2019, Deane was crowned 2019 Formula Drift Champion for the third year in a row, making him the first driver in the sport's history to pull off a 3-peat. Deane tied Chris Forsberg and Fredric Aasbø for three Formula Drift championship titles. However Forsberg's and Aasbø's championships were nonconsecutive, giving reason for many to hail James "The Machine" Deane as the best drifter on the planet.

As a result of the COVID-19 Pandemic, the Worthouse Drift Team withdrew from the 2020 Formula Drift championship. In the same statement, it was also announced that Deane would no longer be competing with Worthouse.

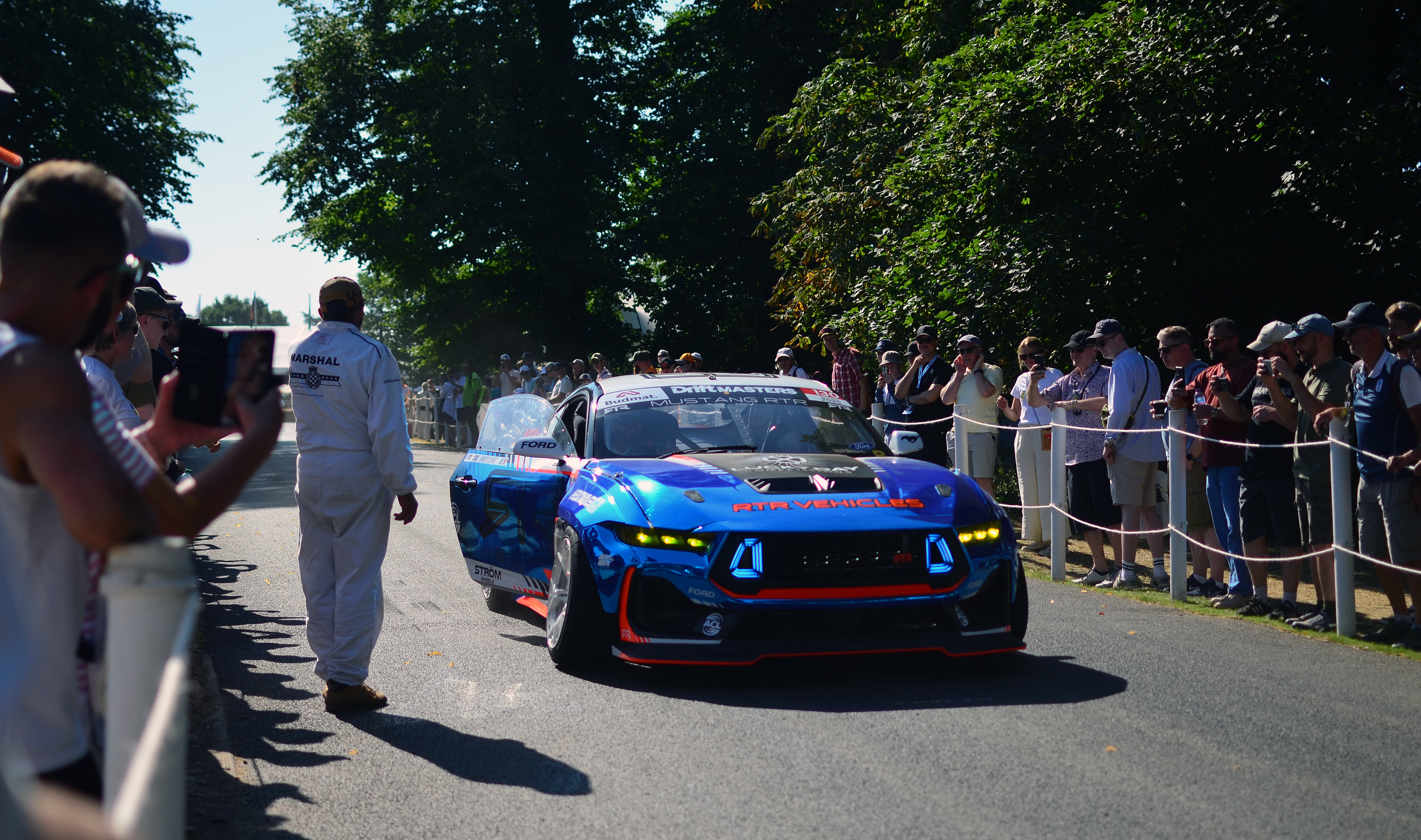
The Ford Mustang RTR Spec 5-FD driven by Deane in his championship-winning 2025 season

On 23 February 2023, Vaughn Gittin Jr. announced that Deane would be competing in Formula Drift 2023 as a member of the RTR Motorsports team. He managed to get 5th place overall with two third place podiums.

On 1 January 2024, Deane returned to Formula Drift with RTR team, he also managed to get a win during the first round of Formula Drift in Long Beach, mark his first win in Formula Drift with RTR Team.

From October 8, 2023–August 10, 2024, Deane had 13 consecutive podiums (longest podium streak in drifting history).

Deane secured back-to-back championship-winning seasons in 2024 and 2025, with four wins and two podium finishes, and three wins and three podium finishes, respectively. Deane became the first four-time and five-time Formula Drift champion with these wins.

== Formula Drift Achievements ==
- 1 of 3 drivers to qualify with a perfect score of 100 points (Tanner Foust - Justin Pawlak - James Deane)
- The first and only driver in the FD's history to pull off a 3-Peat
- The first and only 4-time FD Champion
- The first and only 5-time FD Champion

== Event wins ==
=== Drift Masters wins ===
#	Event	Season	Car
1	(Poland) Round 3, Stadion im. Kazimierza Górskiego	2016	Nissan 180SX
2	(Poland) Round 9, Gdańsk	2016	Nissan 200SX
3	(Poland) Round 11, Stadion im. Kazimierza Górskiego	2016	Nissan 200SX
4	(Poland) Round 1, Stadion im. Kazimierza Górskiego	2017	Nissan 200SX
5	(Latvia) Round 3, Bikernieki Race Track	2018	Nissan 200SX
6	(Poland) Round 4, MotoArena Toruń	2018	Nissan 200SX
7	(Germany) Round 5, Hockenheimring	2018	Nissan 200SX
8	(Republic of Ireland) Round 6, Mondello Park	2018	Nissan 200SX
9	(Germany) Round 5, Ferropolis	2019	BMW E92
10	(Latvia) King of Riga, Bikernieki Race Track	2020	BMW E92
11	(Republic of Ireland) Round 2, Mondello Park	2024	Nissan S14.9

=== Formula Drift wins ===
#	Event	Season	Car	Team
1	LBH	2017	Nissan S15	Worthouse Drift Team
2	ATL	2017	Nissan S15	Worthouse Drift Team
3	SEA	2017	Nissan S15	Worthouse Drift Team
4	TEX	2017	Nissan S15	Worthouse Drift Team
5	WNJ	2018	Nissan S15	Worthouse Drift Team
6	EVS	2018	Nissan S15	Worthouse Drift Team
7	WWT	2019	Nissan S15	Worthouse Drift Team
8	LBH	2024	Ford Mustang RTR Spec 5-D	RTR Motorsports
9	ENG	2024	Ford Mustang RTR Spec 5-D	RTR Motorsports
10	WWT	2024	Ford Mustang RTR Spec 5-D	RTR Motorsports
11	IRW	2024	Ford Mustang RTR Spec 5-D	RTR Motorsports
12	ATL	2025	Ford Mustang RTR Spec 5-D	RTR Motorsports
13	WWT	2025	Ford Mustang RTR Spec 5-D	RTR Motorsports
14	UTA	2025	Ford Mustang RTR Spec 5-D	RTR Motorsports
15	STA	2026	Ford Mustang RTR Spec 5-D	RTR Motorsports

== Career results ==
=== Oman IDC results ===
Year	Team	Car	R1	R2	R3	Pos.
2018	Falken Tire	Nissan S14	1	1	1	1st
2019	Falken Tire	Nissan S14	1	1	2	1st
2020	Falken Tire	Nissan S14	1	9	1	1st
2024	Fmic.ae	Nissan S14.9	1	2	1	1st

=== Formula Drift results ===
Year	Team	Car	1	2	3	4	5	6	7	8	Pos.	Points
2010	Falken Tire	Nissan S14	LBH; Top 8	ATL	WTS	EVS	LVS; Top 32	SON; Top 8	IRW; Top 16		24th	202
2017	Worthouse Drift Team	Nissan S15	LBH; 1	ORL; 9	ATL; 1	NJ; 5	CAN; 3	EVS; 1	TEX; 1	IRW; 3	1st	651
2018	Worthouse Drift Team	Nissan S15	LBH; 4	ORL; 2	ATL; 6	WNJ; 1	EVS; 1	GAT; 6	TEX; 2	IRW; 9	1st	595
2019	Worthouse Drift Team	Nissan S15	LBH; 6	ORL; 11	ATL; 3	WNJ; 3	EVS; 2	WWT; 1	TEX; 2	IRW; 3	1st	565
2023	RTR Motorsports	Ford Mustang RTR Spec 5-D	LBH; 6	ATL; 7	ORL; 7	ENG; 4	WWT; 18	EVS; 3	UTA; 9	IRW; 3	5th	413
2024	RTR Motorsports	Ford Mustang RTR Spec 5-D	LBH; 1	ATL; 3	ORL; 2	ENG; 1	WWT; 1	EVS; 9	UTA; 4	IRW; 1	1st	666
2025	RTR Motorsports	Ford Mustang RTR Spec 5-D	LBH; 2	ATL; 1	ORL; 9	ENG; 3	WWT; 1	EVS; 2	UTA; 1	LBH2; 3	1st	300
2026	RTR Motorsports	Ford Mustang RTR Spec 5-D	LBH; 9	ATL; 2	ORL; 2	STA; 1	IND; C^{4}	EVS	LVS	LBH2		

=== Drift Masters European Championship/Drift Masters results ===
Year	Car	1	2	3	4	5	6	7	Pos.	Points
2018	Nissan 200SX	POL1; 2	HUN; 3	LAT; 1	POL2; 1	GER; 1	IRL; 1		1st	591
2019	BMW E92	AUT; 2	FRA; 5	POL; 5	LAT; 17	GER; 1	IRL; 6		1st	381
2020	BMW E92	LAT; 1							1st	100
2021	Nissan S14.9	AUT1	AUT2	LAT1; 5	LAT2; 3				9th	128
2022	Nissan S14.9	IRL; 3	AUT; 5	SWE; 4	LAT; 2	GER; 17	POL; 3		4th	373
2023	Nissan S14.9/BMW E92	IRL; 5	SWE	FIN	LAT; 7	GER	POL		23rd	104
2024	Nissan S14.9	ESP	IRL; 1	FIN; 3	LAT; 2	HUN; 17	POL; 2		3rd	409
2025	Ford Mustang RTR Spec 5-D	ITA; C	ESP; 5	FIN; 5	IRL; 21	LAT; 2	GER; 17	POL; 4	5th	323
2026	Ford Mustang RTR Spec 5-D	ITA; 2	ESP; 4	IRL; 5	FIN; 7	LAT; 13	GER; 9	POL		

== World records ==
On 14 December 2014, Deane and Jordanian drifter Ahmad Daham set a new Guinness World Record for the world's longest tandem drift, 28.52 kilometres.

From October 8, 2023–August 10, 2024. James went on the longest podium streak (13) in drifting history in three different championships, the Oman International Drift Championship, Drift Masters and Formula Drift.

== Story of starting number 130 ==
Popular actor from Los Angeles James Dean loved racing and his Porsche "Little bastard", on which he died in a car accident, had number 130 on board. James Deane hoped that he could make number 130 more successful.

== Personal life ==
Deane was in a relationship with Becky Evans until some time in 2025, an automotive presenter and YouTuber who stars in the Red Bull series 'Drift Queen'.
