= Falken Tire =

Japanese tire brand

Falken
- Product type: Tires
- Current owner: Sumitomo Rubber Industries (since 2003)
- Produced by: Sumitomo Rubber Industries
- Country: Japan
- Introduced: 1983; 43 years ago
- Related brands: Dunlop
- Markets: Worldwide
- Previous owners: Ohtsu Tire & Rubber (1983–2003)
- Tagline: "On the pulse."
- Website: www.falken.tires

Falken is a brand of passenger car, light truck, and medium truck tires owned by the Japanese company Sumitomo Rubber Industries (SRI). It was launched in its native country of Japan in 1983, and was introduced to the North American market two years later and in Europe in 1988. Falken has now become a stand-alone brand that focuses on UHP (ultra high performance) products while utilizing professional motorsports to further develop and improve products for worldwide distribution.

Dunlop Tires North America, formerly known as Sumitomo Rubber North America, Inc. and Falken Tire Corporation, has its corporate headquarters in Rancho Cucamonga, California, with a West Coast distribution center in Ontario, California. Additional Falken Tire distribution locations include warehouses in Illinois, Florida, New Jersey, and Texas.

In June 2015, Sumitomo and Goodyear announced that they would dissolve their worldwide partnership. As part of the deal, Sumitomo bought Goodyear's Dunlop Tires North America, including a manufacturing plant at Tonawanda, near Buffalo, New York. The plant, rebranded as Sumitomo Rubber USA, began to produce Falken-branded tires in January 2016. As of 2025, that Buffalo, New York, manufacturing plant has closed.

== History ==
=== Timeline ===
- 1983: The Falken brand is created as a high performance brand of Ohtsu Tire & Rubber in Japan.
- 1985: Started Falken Motorsports & U.S. Distribution.
- 1988: Team Falken wins the Mirage Cup International series.
- 1988: Falken introduces the Sincera Tire.
- 1988: Falken Tyre Europe GmbH was founded in Offenbach am Main, Germany.
- 1990: The N1 6-hour Endurance Sugo 400 km GT-R R32 class winner.
- 1991: Falken supports the BNR32 that dominated the Super N1 Taikyu Series in Japan.
- 1991: Team Falken participated in the Kenya Endurance Safari Rally.
- 1991: Opened U.S. headquarters in Rancho Cucamonga, U.S.
- 1993: Sponsors teams for the Paris to Dakar Rally championships.
- 1996: The first Ziex branded tire is launched: Ziex ZE502.
- 1998: Began a successful campaign with Mine's Falken BNR33, which won the '98-'00 Class 1 Series Championship.
- 1999: Team Falken began competing in the Nürburgring 24 Hours race.
- 2000: Falken Tire participates in Rally Australia.
- 2001: AZENIS Tire line is launched with AZENIS ST115 and AZENIS RT215.
- 2001: Team Falken wins Super Endurance Class 1 Series Championship.
- 2001: Falken sponsors the Pikes Peak International Hill Climb.
- 2003: Sumitomo Rubber Industries acquires and absorbs Ohtsu Tire & Rubber, turning Ohtsu and Falken to SRI brands.
- 2003: Falken supports the first U.S. Drift Showoff in Irwindale, California.
- 2003: Falken sponsors the drivers at the first D1 Grand Prix Pro Drift Competition in the U.S.
- 2005: Falken team driver Calvin Wan takes 1st place in an Infiniti G35 at the Formula D-sanctioned event.
- 2006: A Consumer Reports Top Pick: Falken ZE912.
- 2007: Falken moves into the corporate office in Fontana, California.
- 2010: Falken wins the first Formula Drift Championship with Vaughn Gittin Jr.
- 2010: Falken introduces the Wildpeak A/T Tire to reinvigorate the all-performance SUV and Light Truck segments.
- 2011: Falken wins another back-to-back Formula Drift Championship with Daijiro Yoshihara.
- 2011: Two ALMS GT Class wins at Mid-Ohio and Baltimore.
- 2012: Team Falken takes another ALMS win at Baltimore Grand Prix.
- 2012: New Falken Tire headquarters located in Rancho Cucamonga, CA.
- 2012: Falken / Savvy Off Road wins the King of the Hammers Every Man Challenge.
- 2012: Falken drift team driver Lars Verbraeken became a Guinness World Record holder after achieving a new speed record for drifting.
- 2013: Falken wins again at the King of the Hammers Every Man Challenge.
- 2013: Team Falken takes first place in GT at ALMS Petit Le Mans.
- 2015: Falken becomes the official tire of Major League Baseball.
- 2016: The Sumitomo Rubber USA factory in Tonawanda began to produce Falken-branded tires.
- 2016: Falken partners with the Qantas Wallabies as a sponsor.
- 2017: Falken became a sponsor of the English Premier League team Liverpool F.C.
- 2018: Falken became a sponsor of the German Basketball League team EWE Baskets.
- 2018: Falken Azenis FK510 wins the Wheels Magazine Tyre Test in Australia.

== Motorsports ==
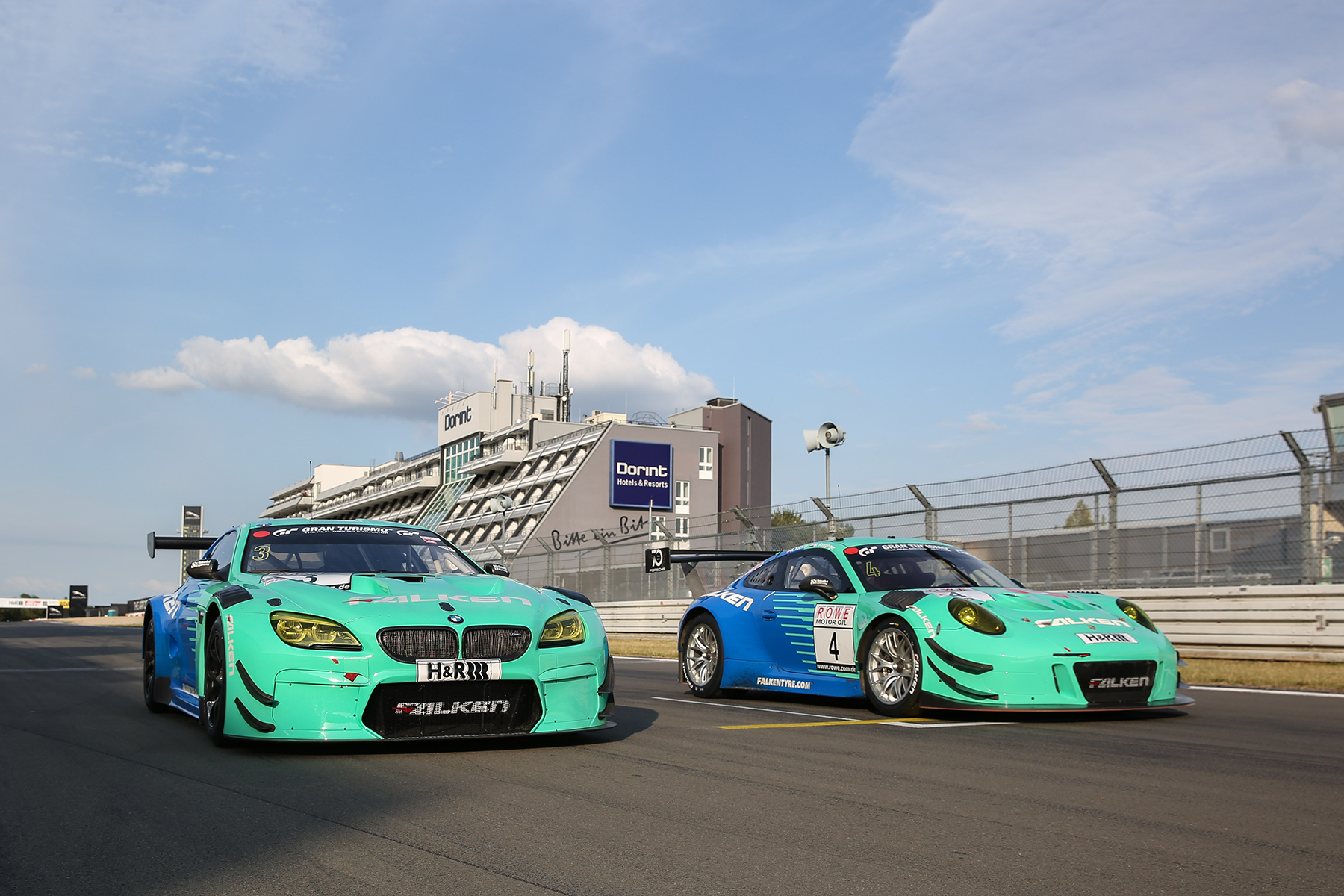
Falken Motorsports Porsche 911 GT3 R and BMW M6 GT3 in one of the 2018 Nürburgring VLN races.

Falken has participated in many motorsport activities, including the Tudor United SportsCar Championship sanctioned by IMSA, the former American Le Mans Series, British Drift Championship, Irish Drift Championship, Drift Allstars European Series with driver James Deane, Formula D, Nürburgring 24 Hours, and the International Drift Series. Drivers for the IMSA GT Class were Wolf Henzler and Bryan Sellers, in which they co-piloted a Porsche 911 RSR. Sponsored drivers for the Formula Drift competition were Daijiro Yoshihara, Justin Pawlak, James Deane, Piotr Wiecek, Matt Field, and Aurimas "Odi" Bakchis. Current drivers in the British Drift Championship competition are Matt Carter, Paul Cheshire and Alan Green. Drivers sponsored in the 2010 International Drift Series were Remmo Niezen, Lars Verbraeken and Lennard Wanders.

Falken has sponsored racing series such as ALMS and domestic championships like Super Taikyu, Nürburgring Langstrecken-Serie (with the Schnabl Engineering racing team), as well as the Nürburgring 24 Hours and drifting series such as Formula D and D1 Grand Prix. Falken was previously the title sponsor of the British Drift Championship until 2010, when Maxxis became the title sponsor.

Since at least 2009, Falken Tire has also had a team of spokesmodels that attend to all of the American Le Mans Series and Formula Drift motorsport events.
