= RTR Vehicles =

Ford Mustang RTR
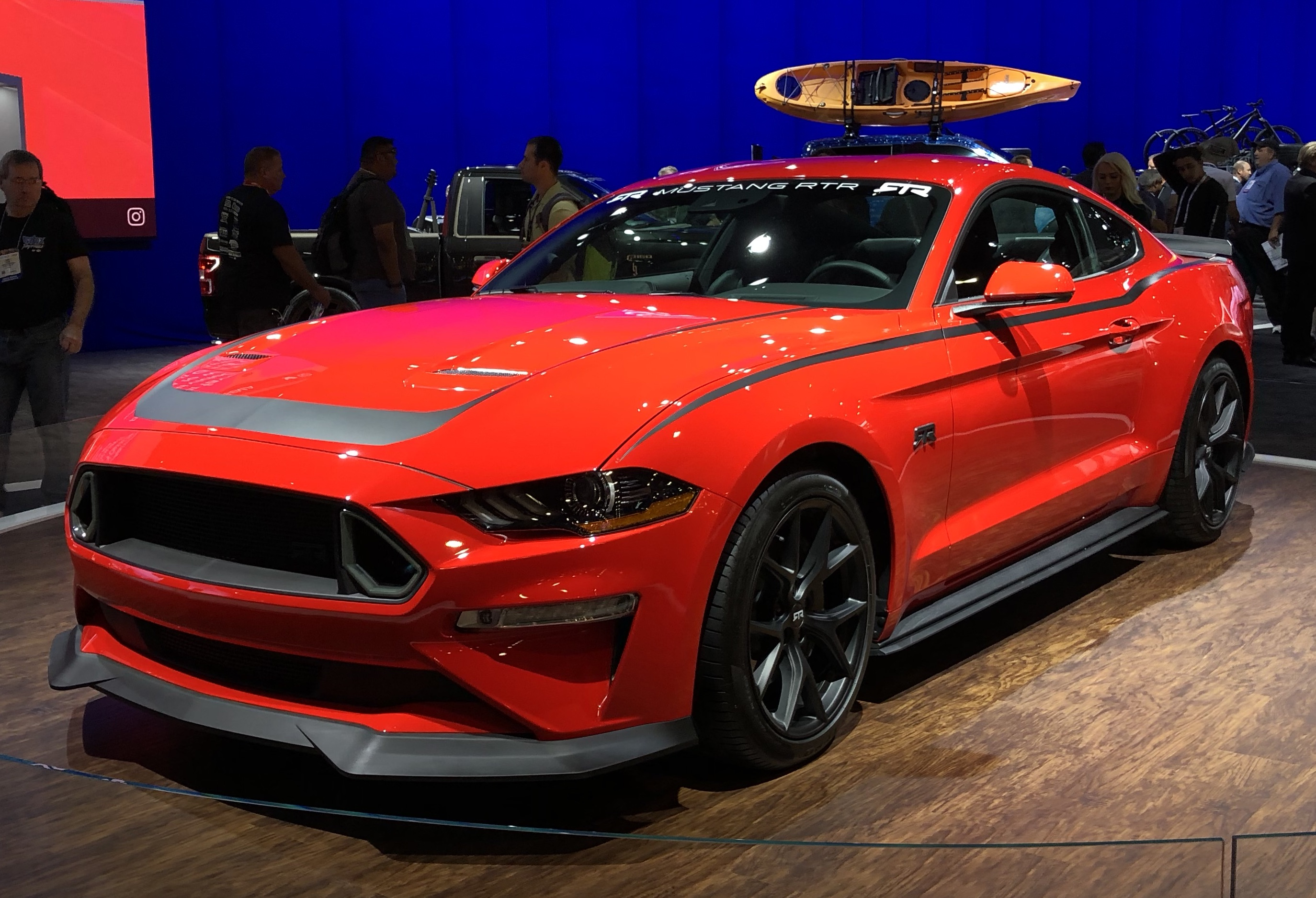
- Series 1 Mustang RTR Powered by Ford Performance

Overview
- Manufacturer: Ford
- Production: 2009–present
- Model years: 2010-present

Body and chassis
- Class: Muscle car
- Layout: FR layout
- Related: Ford Mustang

Powertrain
- Engine: 5.0L "Coyote" V8
- Transmission: 6-speed manual

RTR Vehicles is an American automotive company founded in 2009 by Vaughn Gittin Jr. involved and specializing in designing, developing, and manufacturing OEM+ performance vehicle packages for Ford’s product line, making body packages and components, primary for the Mustang, F-150, Ranger, and Bronco. RTR stands for “Ready to Rock!".

Gittin stated the purpose of launching the RTR brand in 2009 was to reinvigorate interest in the Ford Mustang for the younger generation, whose primary clientele was an aging demographic. Noting the interest of the youth in low-displacement, high-boost imports, Gittin and Ford reasoned that the drifter's influence could help market the high-displacement Mustang in a new way.

== History ==
=== Mustang RTR-C ===
In 2009, RTR announced the launch of a collaborative limited edition of the Ford Mustang entitled the Mustang RTR-C to be revealed at 2009 SEMA Show. The RTR-C features an all-carbon fiber body, HRE CF40 carbon-fiber wheels, 4-piston Wilwood brakes, and 5.0L 4 valve engine with a Ford Racing Supercharger producing over 650 horsepower. The model was limited to 10 units.

=== Mustang RTR-X ===
In 2011, RTR Vehicles produced the Mustang RTR-X, a custom one-off 1969 Ford Mustang. The RTR-X features a Boss 302R crate engine producing over 440 horsepower with Kinsler individual throttle bodies and updated tuning. The bodywork and track width has been heavily widened and lowered, and carbon-fiber accents have been added to both the exterior and interior.

=== Mustang RTR ===
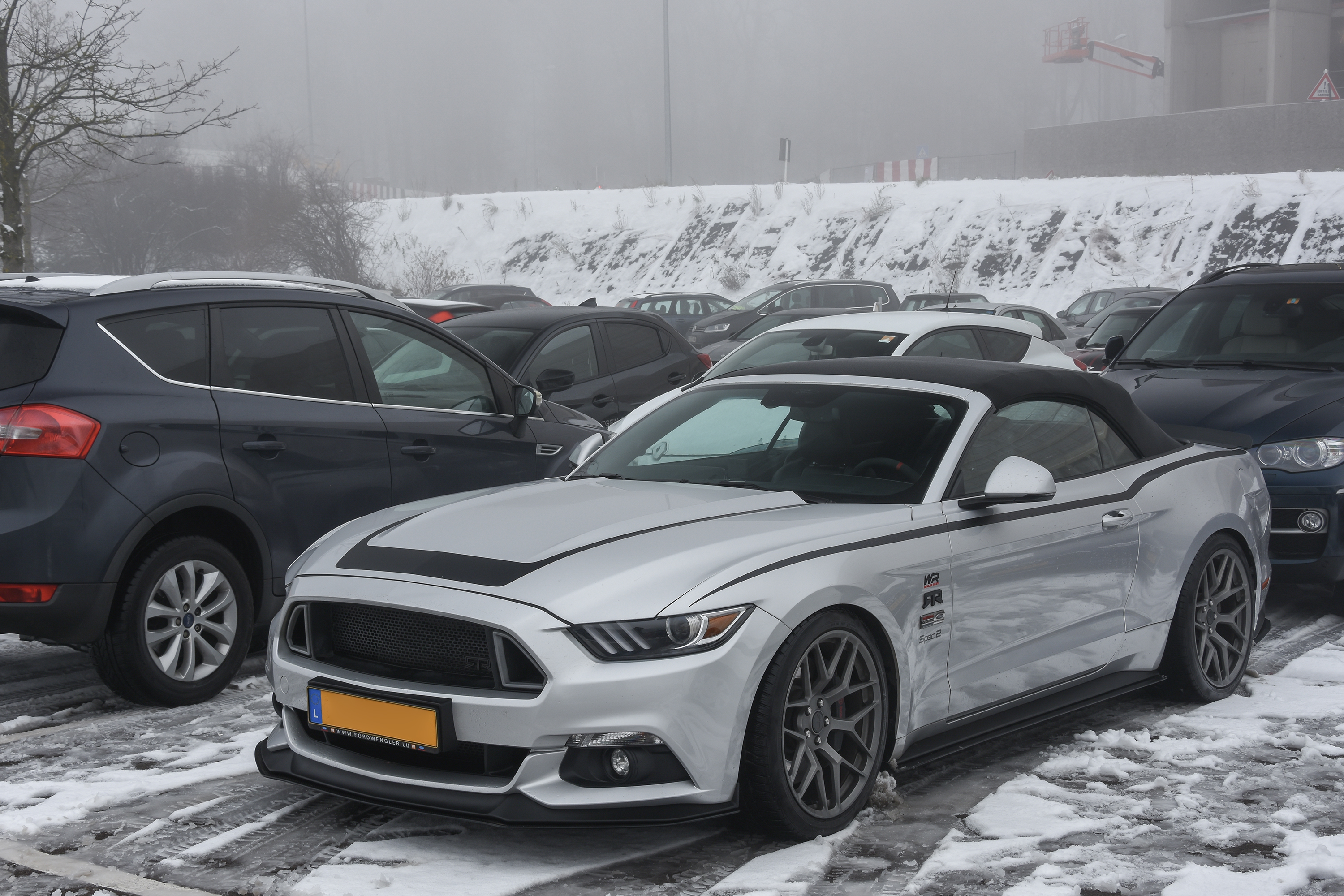
Sixth-generation Ford Mustang Convertible with a dealer-installed RTR Spec 1 package

Beginning in 2011, RTR Vehicles has produced aftermarket Mustang RTR packages, including styling elements such as signature grille lights and body kit parts, as well as tuning and chassis upgrades. These packages could be installed at select Ford dealerships, or ordered directly from RTR Vehicles. These packages also have escalating levels of customization, ranging from Spec 1 to Spec 5. For example, the 2026 RTR Spec 5 model offers a wide-body kit, extensive modifications, and tuning, producing over 870 horsepower from a Whipple-supercharged engine.

==== Production model ====
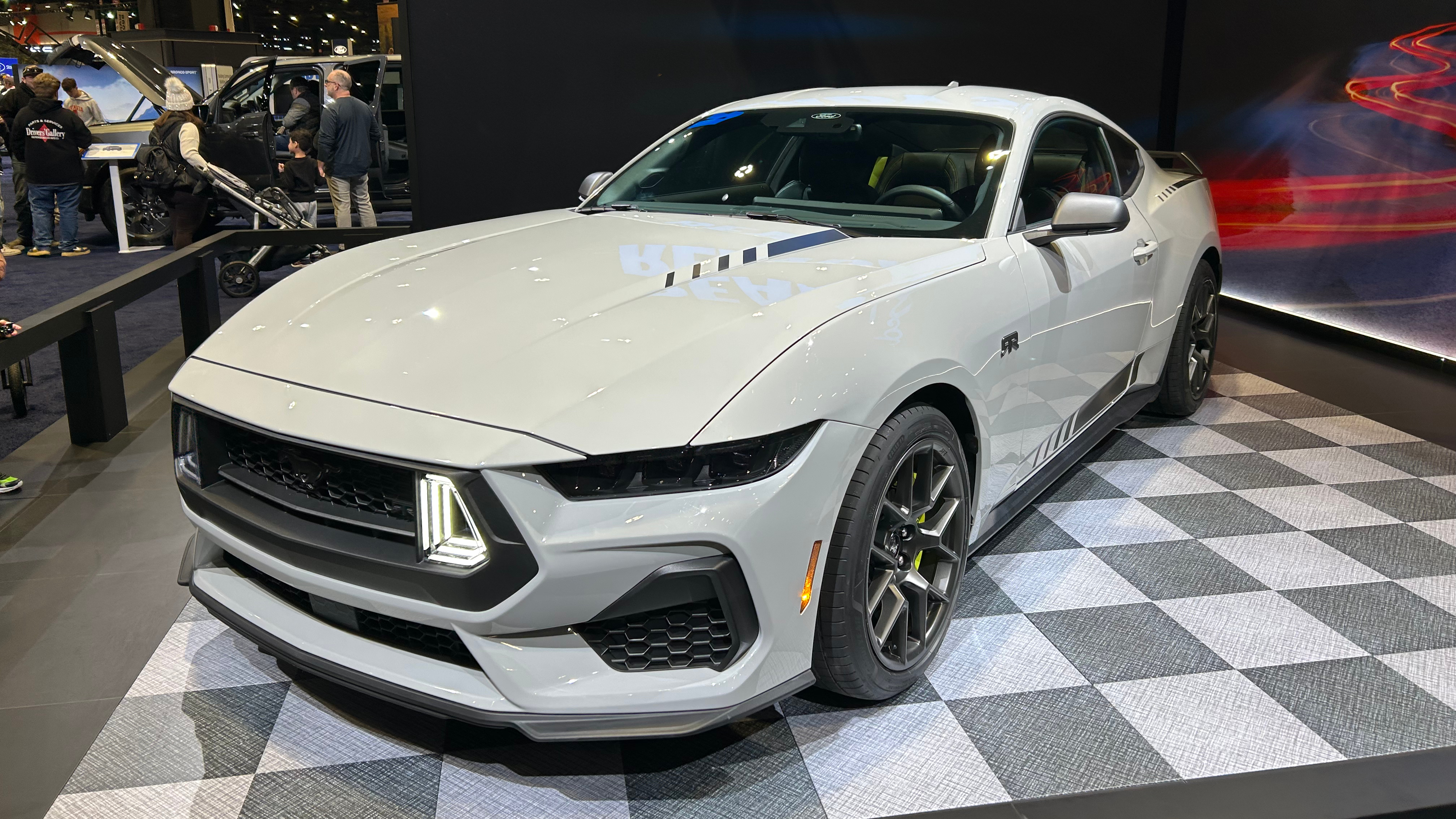
2026 Ford Mustang Ecoboost RTR

In October 2025, Ford and RTR announced an official production Ford Mustang RTR model for the 2026 model year. This is the first RTR model to be offered from the Ford factory. The model features updated styling, the 2.3 L EcoBoost turbocharged 4-cylinder, active exhaust system with quad tips, Brembo brakes from the Mustang GT's Performance Pack, and chassis parts from the Dark Horse. The Mustang RTR highlights drifting capabilities, featuring the "drift brake" handbrake, steering components with more travel, and the stability-control system with a special tune in Track mode.

=== Bronco RTR ===
In January 2026, Ford and RTR announced an official production Bronco RTR model for the 2027 model year. The model features updated styling, the 2.3 L EcoBoost turbocharged 4-cylinder, 33-inch tires and lifted suspension as standard. The addition of the Sasquatch package adds 35-inch tires, upgraded Fox dampers, and a locking front differential.

== In media ==
The Mustang RTR appears in the video game Need for Speed: The Run as a playable car. Need for Speed: Payback and Need for Speed: Heat also features RTR parts that can be installed on the 2015 Ford Mustang GT Premium in-game.

The Mustang RTR-X appears in Need for Speed: World, Shift 2: Unleashed, Need for Speed: The Run, and Need for Speed: Edge.

The 2018 Ford Mustang RTR Spec 5 was shown on season 3, episode 1 of The Grand Tour. Co-host Jeremy Clarkson drove the Spec 5 against co-host Richard Hammond in the Dodge Challenger SRT Demon, and co-host James May in the Hennessey Camaro ZL1 “Exorcist” in a series of challenges. The Spec 5 recording the best time on their makeshift race track and being declared the car Richard Hammond would buy of the three with his own money.

== RTR Motorsports ==
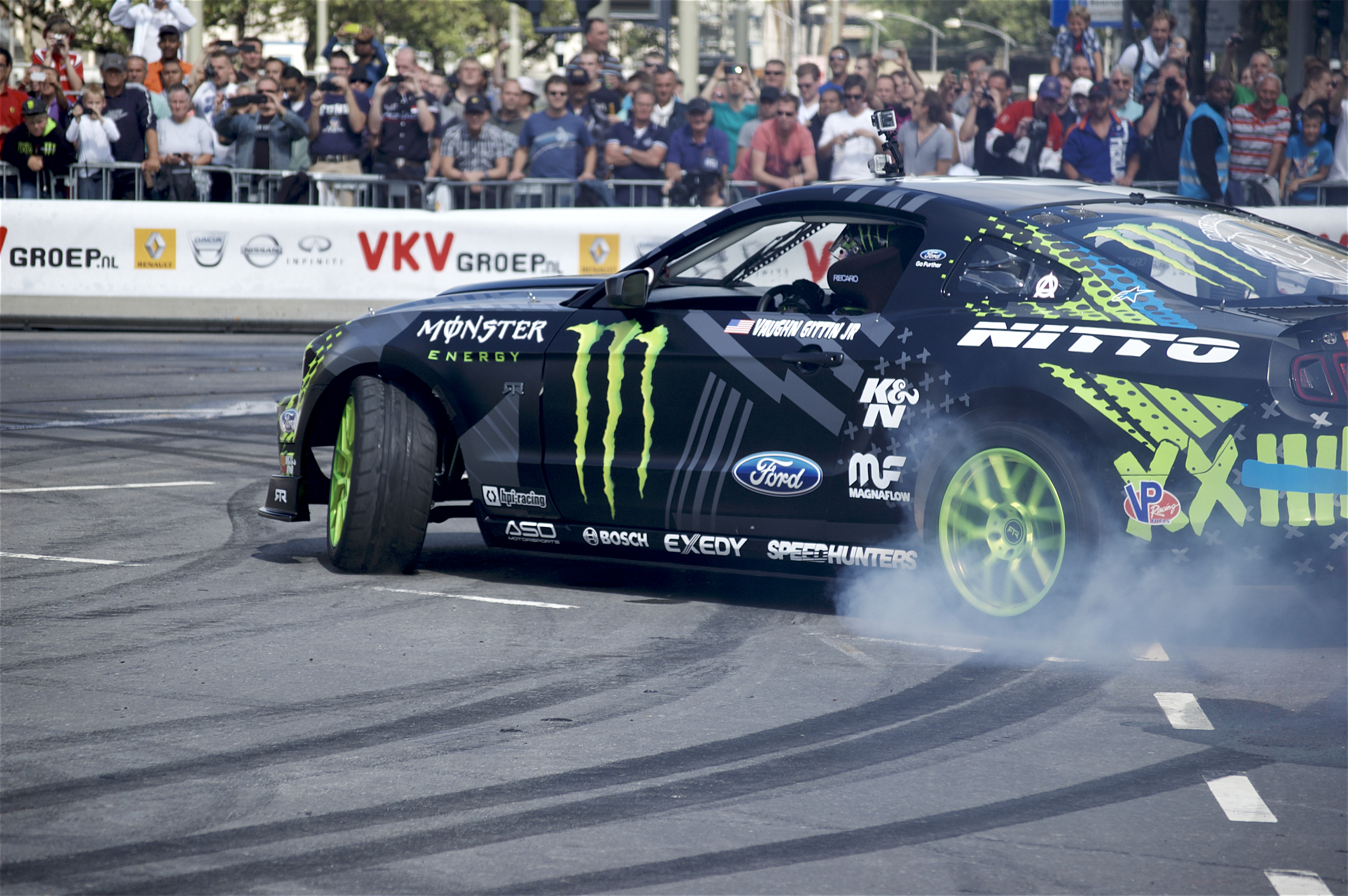
Gittin drifting the 2013 RTR Motorsports Mustang

In 2013, Vaughn Gittin Jr. formally announced the launch of his own RTR Drift Team in Formula Drift. The Formula D team later expanded in 2017 to include a second driver, Chelsea DeNofa. Gittin won the championship in 2020.

With Gittin's retirement from Formula D after 2021, Adam LZ has taken his place on the RTR Motorsports team alongside DeNofa. Gittin returned in part-time capacity in 2023, and James Deane was also added to the four-driver lineup.

DeNofa went on to win the 2023 Formula Drift championship, and retired from the sport.

Deane continued to have two successful championship seasons in 2024 and 2025, with 4 wins and 2 podium finishes, and 3 wins and 3 podium finishes, respectively. Deane became the first and only four-time and five-time Formula Drift champion, and RTR Motorsports became a four-time championship team.

The team has also backed Gittin in the Ultra4 USA racing series at the King of the Hammers, and in NASCAR Canada from 2014 to 2015.
