= Mine's =

Japanese auto tuning company

- Type: Kabushiki gaisha
- Industry: Car tuning
- Founded: 1985
- Founder: Michizo Niikura
- Headquarters: Yokosuka, Kanagawa Prefecture, Japan
- Website: mines-wave.com

Mine's Co., Ltd. (Japanese: 株式会社マインズ, Hepburn: Kabushiki-gaisha Mainzu), or simply Mine's, is a tuning firm based in Yokosuka, Kanagawa Prefecture, Japan.

== Overview ==
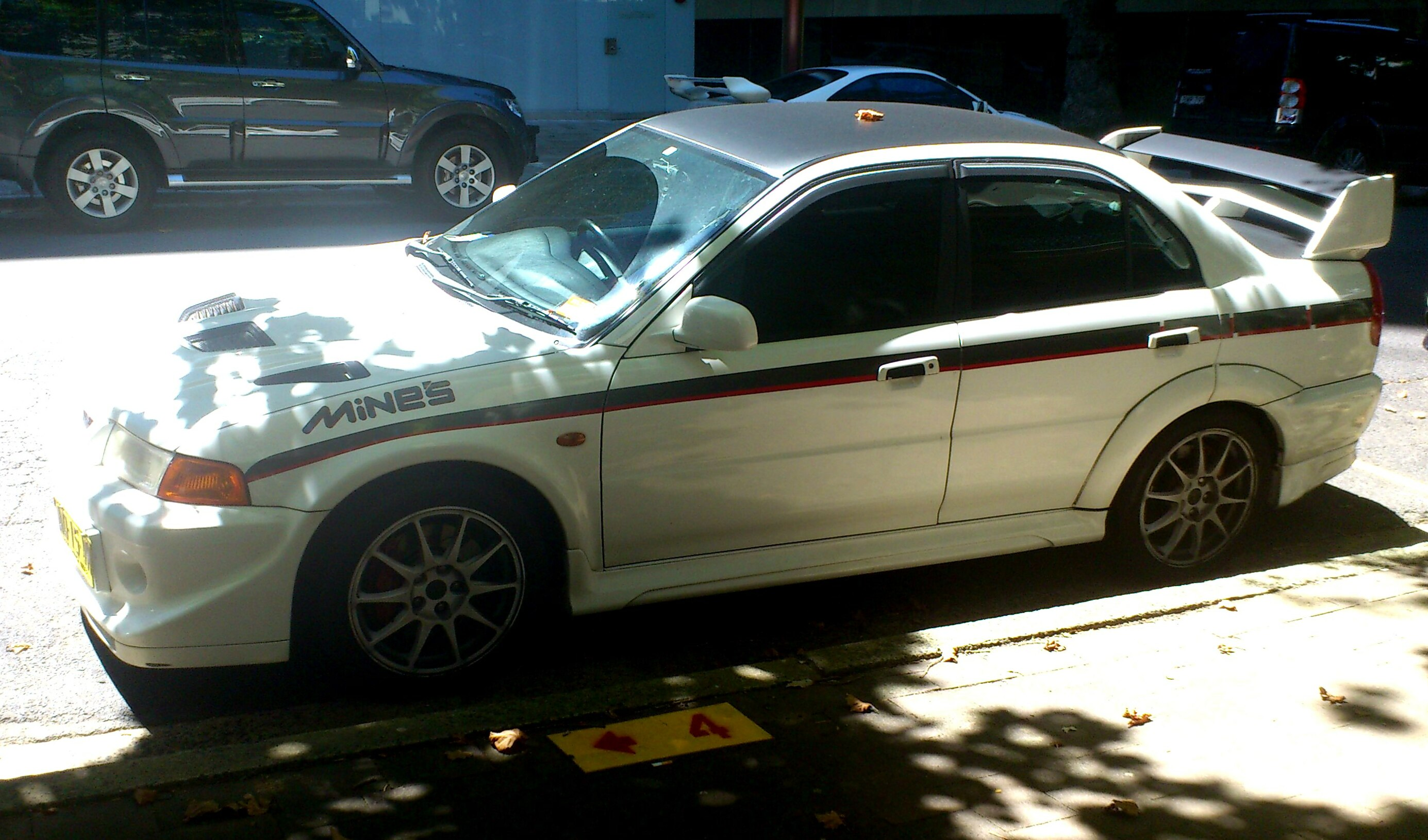
Mine's Mitsubishi Lancer Evolution VI

Mine's was started by Michizo Niikura in 1985. It attracted attention in 1988 with the debut of its VX-ROM ECU module for the Nissan R31 Skyline GT-R, being among the first Japanese companies to sell reprogrammed ECUs for Japanese sports cars. Mine's currently sells VX-ROMs for hundreds of Japanese cars, but only produces hardware upgrades for a few select cars. The latter includes exhaust systems, engine internals, suspension parts, brake systems, and carbon fiber body parts.

Mine's is also known for its work on the Nissan Skyline GT-R—specifically the R32, R33, and R34 models, as well as the Nissan R35 GT-R. Aside from the Skyline GT-R, Mine's also sells upgrades for other cars such as the Mitsubishi Lancer Evolution, the Subaru Impreza WRX, and the Nissan Fairlady Z. The Mine's Z is unusual because it remains naturally aspirated, unlike Zs from other tuners.

Mine's has also gained additional popularity through video games, most notably the Gran Turismo and Forza series.
