= Toyo Tires =

Japanese tire manufacturing company

Toyo Tire Corporation

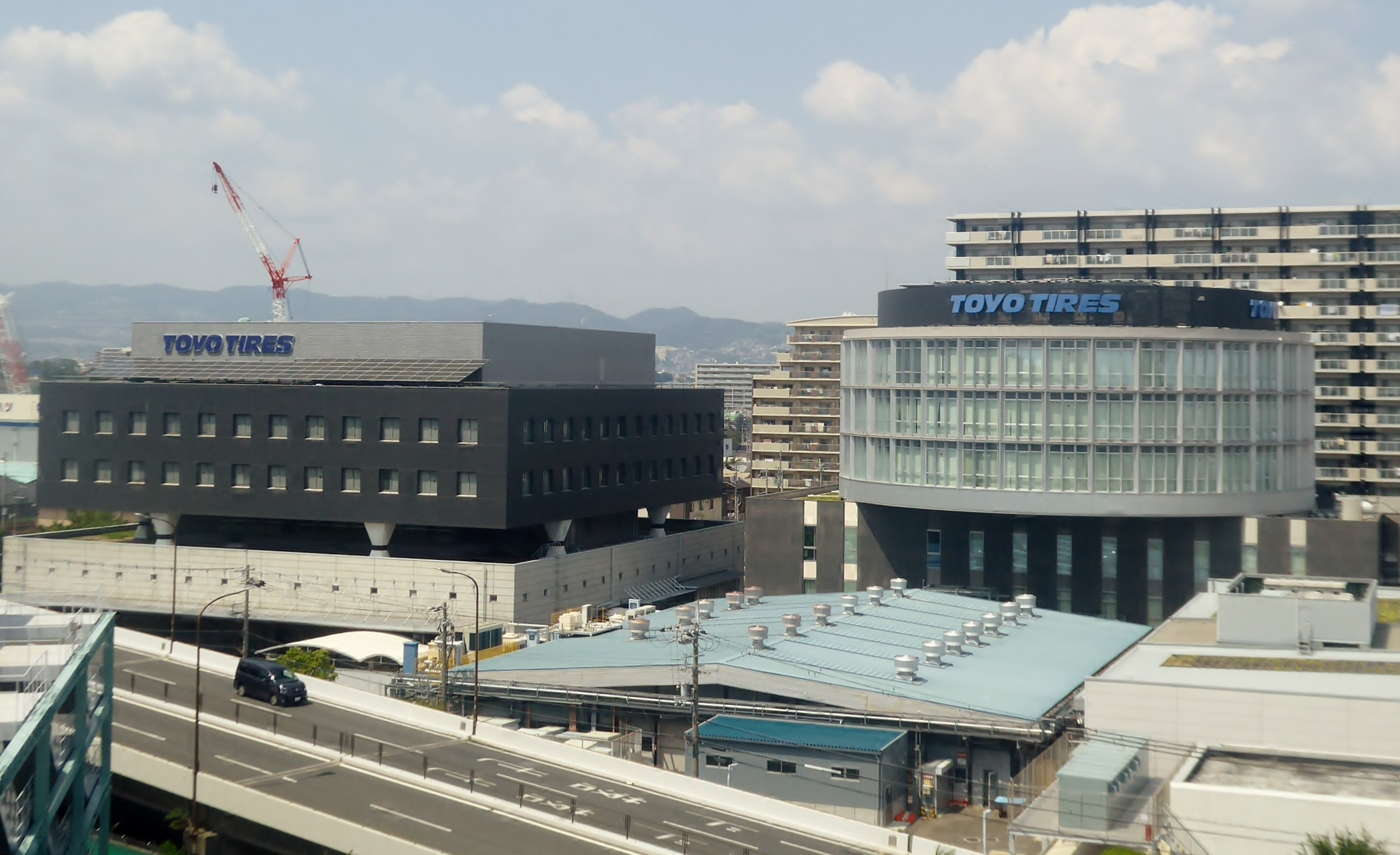
- The company headquarters building in Itami
- Trade name: Toyo Tires
- Native name: TOYO TIRE(トーヨータイヤ)株式会社
- Romanized name: TŌYŌ TAIYA kabushiki gaisha
- Formerly: Toyo Tire & Rubber Co., Ltd (until 2019)
- Type: Public KK
- Traded as: TYO: 5105
- Industry: Automotive
- Founded: August 1, 1945; 81 years ago
- Headquarters: Itami, Hyogo, Japan
- Area served: Global
- Key people: Takashi Shimizu (CEO)
- Products: Motor vehicle tires Industrial rubber products Rubber automotive parts
- Revenue: ▲JPY 497 billion (FY 2022)
- Net income: ▲JPY 48 billion (FY 2022)
- Number of employees: 12,804 (consolidated, as of December 31, 2018)
- Website: www.toyotires-global.com

Toyo Tire Corporation (TOYO TIRE(トーヨータイヤ)株式会社, TŌYŌ TAIYA Kabushiki-gaisha), commonly known as Toyo Tires, is a multinational tire and rubber products company based in Itami, Japan. The company owns and operates eight factories in Asia, North America, and Europe and distributes tires and automotive components through fourteen sales companies throughout the world.

Its lines of business are manufacturing and marketing of car tires, industrial rubber and synthetic resin products, soft and rigid polyurethane products, waterproof sheets, anti-vibration rubber for automotive parts, seat cushions, and sporting goods. Its tire brands are Toyo, Nitto, and Silverstone.

Toyo Tires posted net sales of 497B Japanese yen for fiscal year 2022. It is the eleventh largest tire company in the world based on 2022 revenue.

== History ==
The company started in 1945. In 1966, the company expanded to the United States as Toyo Tire USA Corporation. In 1999, Nitto Tire North America was established.

== Sponsorship ==
Toyo has sponsored off-road Trophy Truck drivers including Robby Gordon, Kyle LeDuc, BJ Baldwin, Tavo Vildósola, Gus Vildósola, Andy McMillin and Bryce Menzies. As well as rally and stunt driver Ken Block.

Meanwhile, Nitto has sponsored the King of the Hammers rock crawling race, and drifting drivers Vaughn Gittin Jr. (since 2013), Chelsea DeNofa (2017-2024), Ryan Tuerck (2019-2024), Fredric Aasbø (2020-2024), and Adam LZ (2021-2024).

In 1988, Toyo began an exclusive sponsorship deal with legendary Australian rally and touring car driver Colin Bond who was running a Ford Sierra RS500 in the Australian Touring Car Championship. Using largely experimental tyres as at the time Toyo were relatively new to making Racing slick tyres compared to their opposition (in Australian touring car racing the other tyre manufacturers of the time were Dunlop, Bridgestone, Yokohama, Pirelli and Avon), Bond would finish 3rd in the championship in 1988 as well as winning the Amaroo Park based AMSCAR series. He then teamed with 1980 Formula One World Drivers' Champion and former Network Alfa team mate Alan Jones to finish 3rd in the 1988 Tooheys 1000 at Bathurst before finishing 2nd outright in the Asia-Pacific Touring Car Championship. After a lean year in 1989, Bond and the Toyo's returned to prominence in the 1990 Australian Touring Car Championship, winning the Lakeside and Mallala rounds of the 8 round series to eventually finish the title in 4th place. Bond continued to run Toyo tyres on his teams cars (the Sierra's were followed in 1993 by Toyota Corolla Seca AE93's) until shutting his team down at the end of 1993. Bond and team mate John Smith had placed 3rd and 2nd respectively in the Corolla's in the 1993 Australian 2.0 Litre Championship.

The company has also sponsored the Ultimate Fighting Championship mixed martial arts promotion from 2006 to 2008 and later since 2011.

Since 2012, the company has been sponsoring Toyo Tires F1600 Championship Series, an Ontario-based Formula Ford racing series.

== Gallery ==
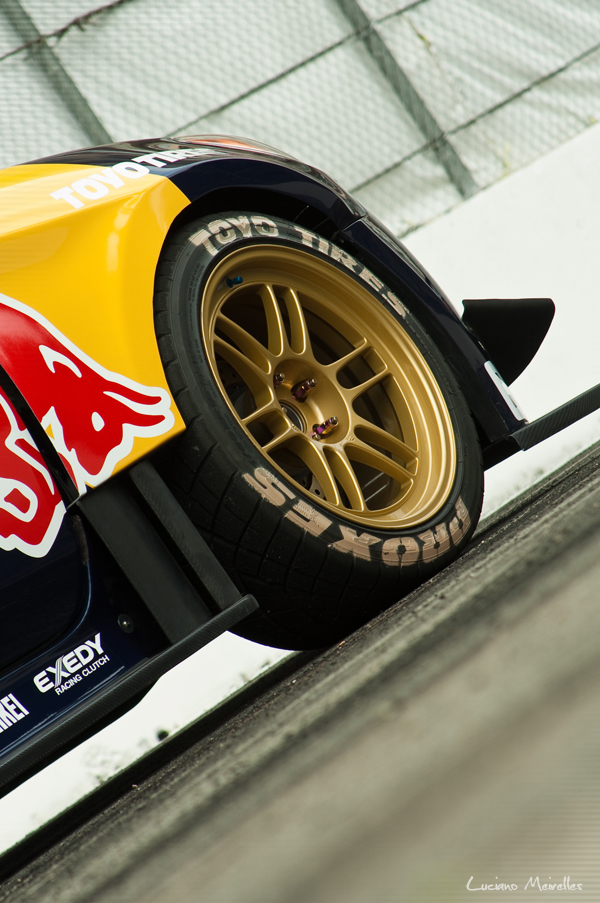
Formula Drift car with Toyo Tires in Long Beach, California

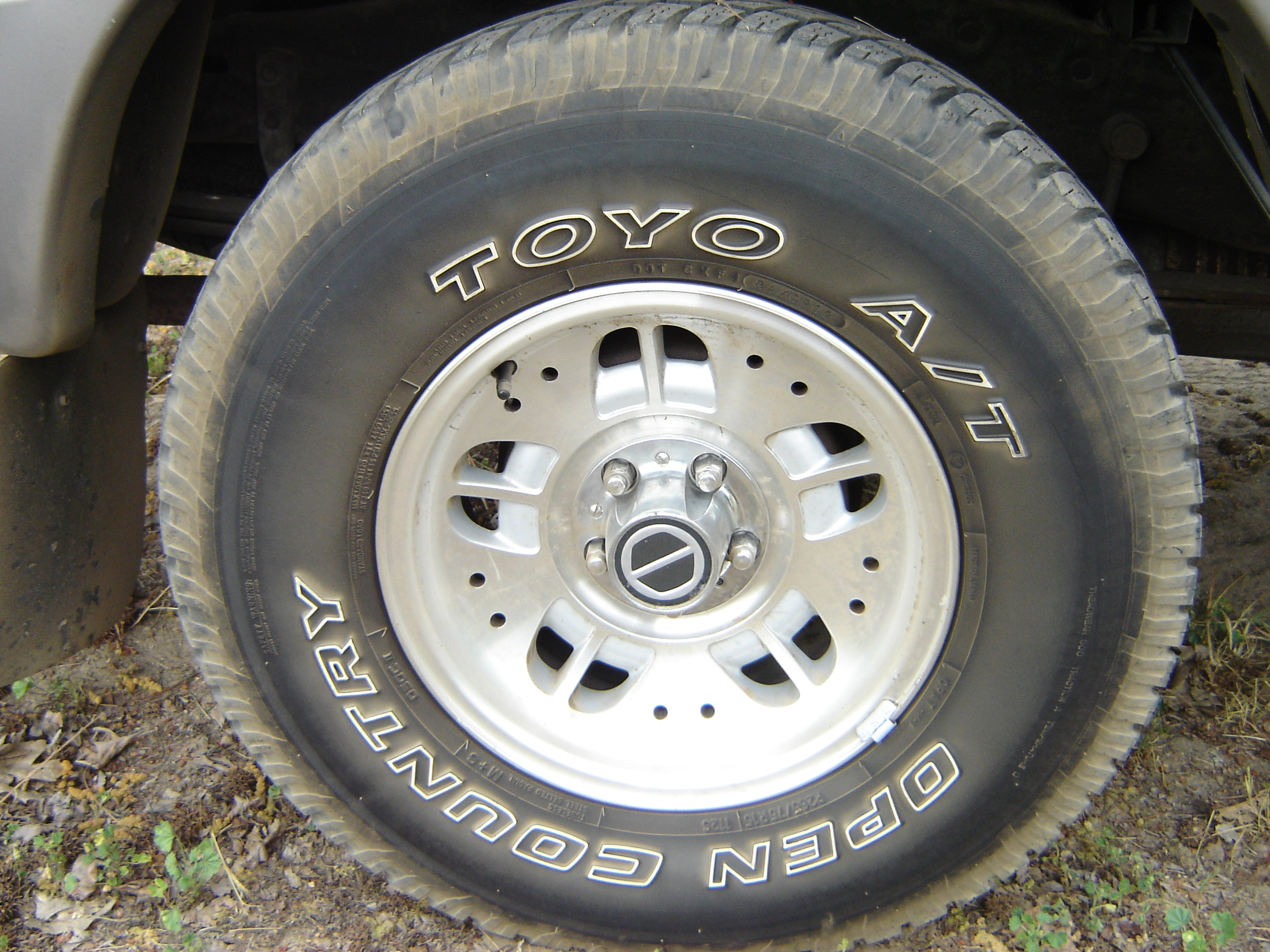
A Toyo Open Country A/T

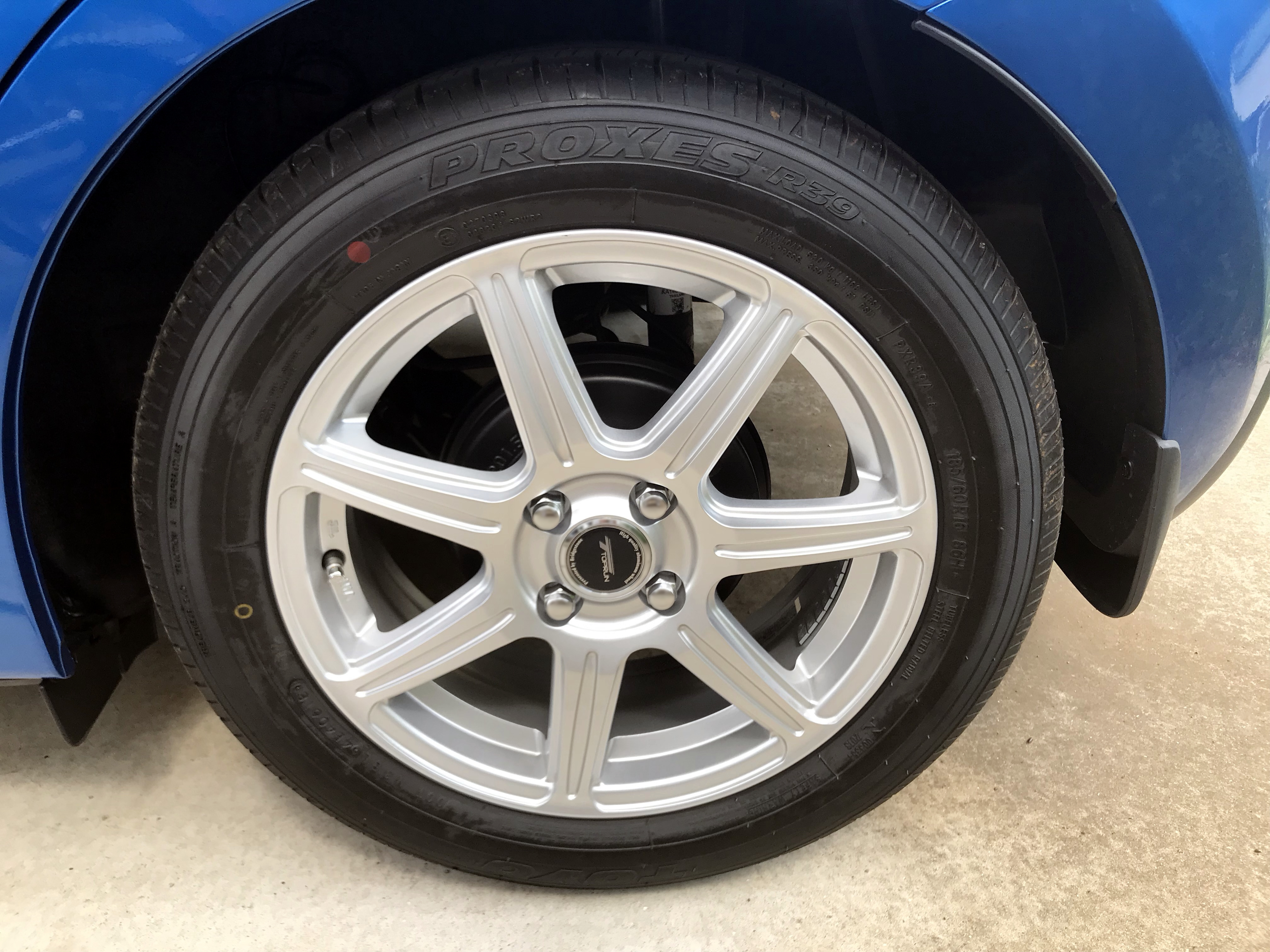
A Toyo Proxes R39 on a Mazda Demio

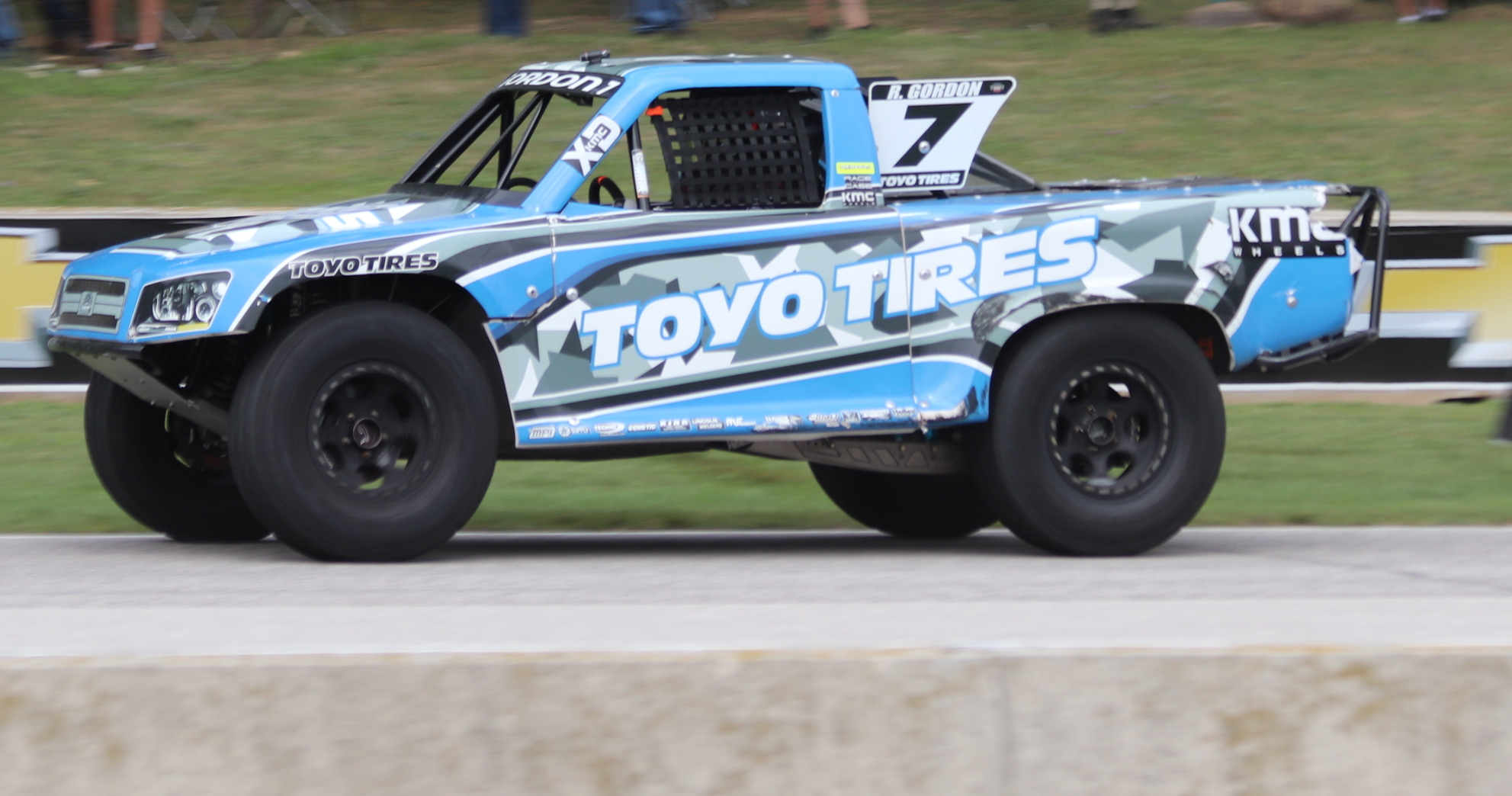
Robby Gordon's Toyo-sponsored truck at the 2018 Speed Energy Formula Off-Road

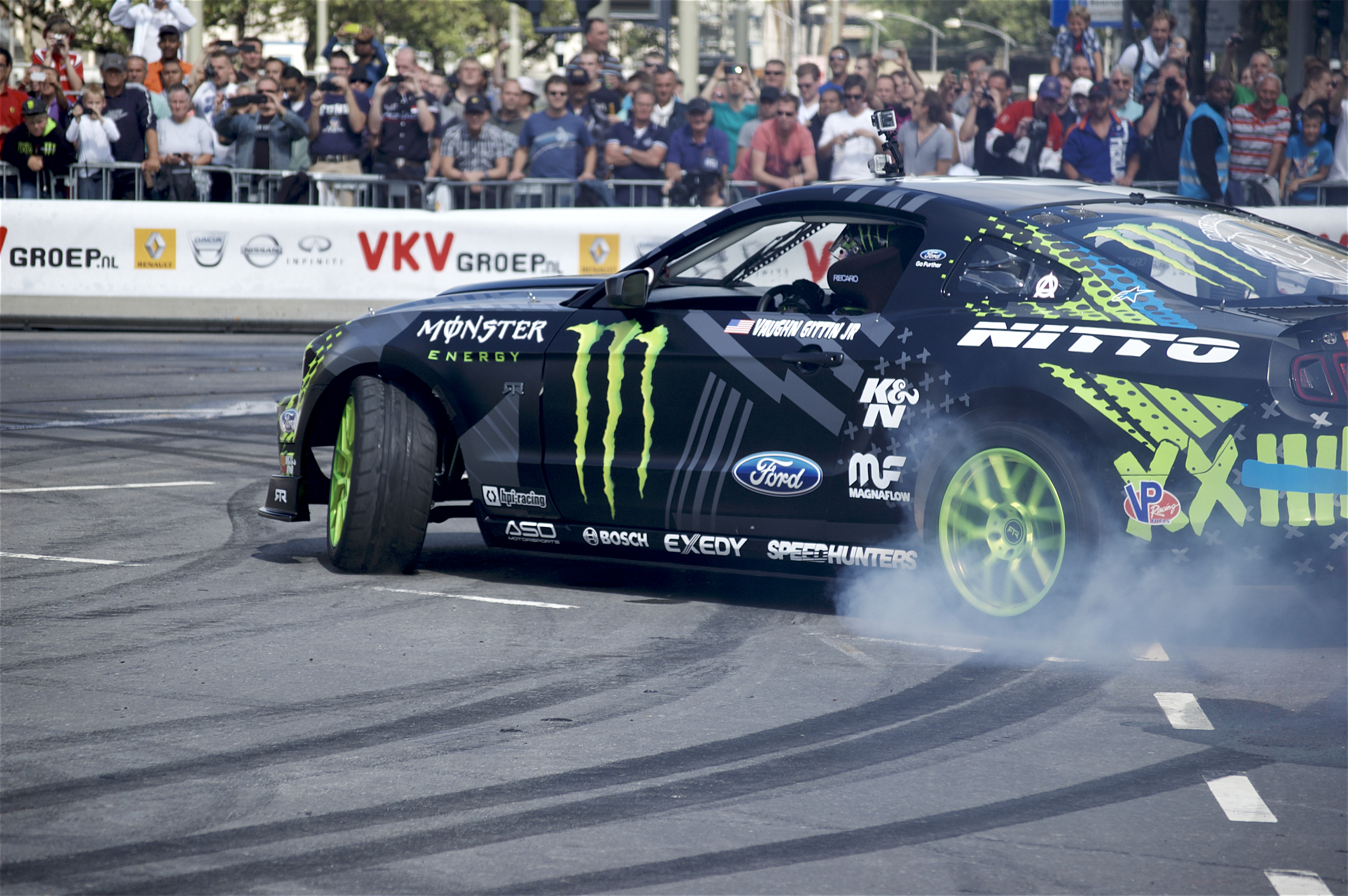
Vaughn Gittin's Nitto-sponsored car at a 2013 drifting event
