= Chris Forsberg =

American drifting driver

- Nationality: United States
- Born: Christopher Peter Forsberg; 6 April 1982 (age 44) Doylestown, Pennsylvania, U.S.

Formula D career
- Debut season: 2004
- Current team: Forsberg Motorsports
- Car number: 64
- Wins: 17
- Best finish: 1st in 2009, 2014, 2016

Championship titles
- 2009 2014 2016: Formula D Formula D Formula D

Christopher Peter Forsberg (born April 6, 1982), is an American Formula D driver from Doylestown, Pennsylvania. He competes in the Formula Drift series in his Nissan Z (RZ34) for Forsberg Racing, where he is the owner and shop manager.

Forsberg has competed in every round of Formula Drift since 2004, and is a three-time champion. During this time he amassed the most head-to-head battle wins and podium finishes in Formula Drift history.

Upon closing of the 2020 Formula Drift season, Forsberg won the award for Best Drifting Style, while Forsberg Racing's James Caldwell won Crew Chief of the Year at the Virtual Awards Banquet as voted on by Formula Drift teams.

Forsberg Racing (with Bryan Heitkotter as driver) competed in the 2021 Gridlife Touring Cup wheel-to-wheel racing championship. Its entry was a Nissan 370z.

Forsberg Racing has two entries in the eSports World Championships. This esports racing series mimics the FIA GT World Challenge and uses the Assetto Corsa Competizione software platform. The team consists of Bryan Heitkotter and Forsberg, each driving a Nissan GT-R NISMO GT3.

== Early life ==
As a teenager, Forsberg learned how to work on cars with his black 1988 Mazda RX-7 FC.

Forsberg credits Tony Angelo, Initial D, Option Magazine, and his brother Erik with introducing him to the RX-7 and drifting.

=== Grassroots Drifting ===
In the winter of 2003, Forsberg held a drift event in Old Bridge Township Raceway Park, New Jersey.

By March 2003, Mike Napp, then president of the facility, gave Forsberg permission to organize motorsport events.

== Professional drifting career ==
=== 2004 ===
In 2004, Forsberg placed second at his first ever Formula Drift event at Road Atlanta and followed with another podium finish at Round 2 in Houston, Texas.

Forsberg drove the 350Z SR20DET for part of the inaugural season, but had to switch to a borrowed Nissan Silvia S13 for one race because of technical difficulties. The SR20DET Z finished the campaign.

After Irwindale, the team participated in a D1 event in which Forsberg became the first American driver to beat a Japanese driver, Team Orange's Kazuhiro Tanaka.

=== 2005 ===
Forsberg competed in the Team Falken Password JDM Silvia S15. His last battle of the season was the season finale against Rhys Millen in his GTO. Super Street documented the drama:

"The finals between Rhys Millen and Team Falken's Forsberg Forsberg would be something for the books however. On Forsberg's old 350Z, he had a sticker that said, "too close for missiles, switching to guns!" Well, in the season finale and the final battle, the sticker could have read 'where there's smoke, there's fire!' That's right, in blazing glory and a fiery drift battle, Forsberg's rear bumper lit up as he went completely sideways through the course at speeds only Millen could duplicate. A one more time was in the works which proved too much for Millen's GTO. Suspension problems would ensue on the GTO as Forsberg continued his consistency through the track at blazing speed producing tons of smoke."

Forsberg won the round and attained his first Formula Drift win.

=== 2006 ===
Nissan North America took notice of Forsberg's driving and gave him a convertible 350z for the 2006 season. The team swapped the stock VQ35DE engine for the Nissan Titan's VK56DE V8. The convertible was not a competitive car for Forsberg, and he had to use his backup car, the SR20DET 350Z, for a few rounds as he sorted out the V8 and its chassis. He had two unfavorable rounds of the seven, though he still qualified.

=== 2007 ===
2007 was Forsberg's first to run his own team and act as team manager. Collaborating with Maxxis tires, and on a shoestring budget, he campaigned for a top three-level team. Fueled by contingency money, 2007 was a breakout year. Because of its success, Maxxis matched Formula Drift's winnings. The team finished second place overall, paving the way for its NOS Energy Drink sponsorship.

=== 2008 ===
NOS Energy Drink committed to a full title sponsorship, building on their previous relationship. The year started by beating Tanner Foust and Sam Hubbinette at Long Beach, taking first place.

=== 2009 ===
Forsberg won his first Formula Drift championship, as well as the Tires.com Triple Crown bonus prize, becoming the first driver to win both in the same season. His win marked the first time a Formula Drift champion had a purely drifting/enthusiast background, whereas previous champions had professional motorsport experience.

=== 2010 ===
Formula Drift brought in more V8s and more power. Midway through 2010, the team installed an upgraded Nissan Motorsports engine, adding 200 hp, and bringing total horsepower up to approximately 580rwhp.

=== 2011 ===
2011 marked Forsberg's first full season in a 370Z and a Nissan Motorsports engine. This car had factory angle, brakes, and gas tank. Nissan supplied the chassis and motor. The car was mildly built with a focus on good reliability. The team finished third overall.

=== 2012 ===
The team parted ways with its crew chief and Forsberg moved to Maryland, where MA Motorsports prepared and built his cars. Its focus was on vehicle weight reduction and engine reliability. The team finished 11th overall.

=== 2013 ===
In a personally contentious season, Forsberg would get second overall, accompanied by rumors, accusations, and conspiracy theories.

=== 2014 ===
Forsberg and the team held points position from the first round to the last round (never lost points position) and clinched their second Formula Drift title. NOS Energy Drink left as a primary sponsor due to the company's corporate restructuring, reducing funds and a raw, matte black, carbon fiber livery. That season, the car was upgraded by 150 hp, which included nitrous. The Forsberg Racing team expanded to two cars for 2014, with Jhonnattan Castro taking the second seat in an updated version of Forsberg's 2012 370Z chassis. Forsberg presented the idea of the "Start Line Chicane" to Formula Drift, which has been implemented in nearly every drifting series in the world.

=== 2015 ===
Forsberg ran the first half of the season without major financial support. It was the team's third consecutive year of top-three championship finishes.

=== 2016 ===
Despite not winning an event, Forsberg was crowned Formula Drift champion, once again piloting his V8-powered Nissan 370Z. His consistency (two third-place finishes and four second-place finishes, all consecutively) allowed him to take the championship lead after Round six in Seattle, which he continued to defend until the final round in Irwindale. He won the Formula Drift World Championship after participating in a Formula Drift World Championship round in Okayama, Japan, which made him eligible to score World Championship points.

=== 2017 ===
Forsberg moved back to California from Maryland. Nameless Performance took over the race team management and vehicle prep. The team developed a twin-turbo VQ35HR engine package versus the V8. The season's 11th overall finish was due to multiple engine issues and repeated use of the backup car.

=== 2018 ===
Forsberg took control of the race team and rebuilt the car with his team in southern California. 2018 was a year of growth for his pit crew, as they made the car more competitive. Even with multiple engine failures, the team managed several podiums as well as a win in Round 3. The team finished fourth overall.

=== 2019 ===
After two years of struggling with the VQ platform, the team committed to the Nissan VR38DETT engine. The team finished sixth overall and was able to prove the VR engine's reliability.

=== 2020 ===
Forsberg landed on the podium at Round 5 and followed with a first place finish in Round 6. However, engine failure during Rounds 7 and 8 took the team out of championship contention. The team finished fifth overall.

== Competition cars ==
Year	Team	Car	Engine
2004	N/A	Nissan 350Z	SR20DET
2005	Falken Password JDM	Nissan Silvia S15	SR20DET
2006	Sears Auto Center	Nissan 350Z	VK56DE V8
2007	N/A	Nissan 350Z	VK56DE V8
2008 - 2010	NOS Energy Drink Nissan	Nissan 350Z	VK56DE V8
2011 - 2016	NOS Energy Drink Nissan	Nissan 370Z	VK56DE V8
2017, 2018	NOS Energy Drink Nissan	Nissan 370Z	VQ35HR TT
2019, 2020, 2021	NOS Energy Drink Nissan	Nissan 370Z	VR38DE TT

== Special Projects and Vehicles ==
=== 1975 Datsun "Gold Leader" x RAD Industries 280Z ===
In 2014, Forsberg purchased a stripped-down RB motor equipped 1975 280Z for $4,000 with no intention of making it a show car, until AEM approached him about displaying it in their 2016 SEMA booth.

With help from RAD Industries some of the car's build specs included: CarbonSignal seats, carbon/suede door cards/center console, widebody kit, TechnoToy Tuning suspension, Wilwood brakes, Speedhut meters, hydraulic handbrake, 500 hp RB25DET engine and custom SSR MS-1 wheels. "Gold Leader" would win SuperStreet/Meguiar's Best in Show and the Sony PlayStation Best Import award.

=== Nissan Rally 370Z x Broken Motorsports ===
The Rally Z buildout is an American Rally Association compliant homage to the 1971 East African Safari Rally overall winner Datsun 240Z. The collaboration between Nissan/Nismo and Broken Motorsports was intended for display at SEMA 2020, but because of the global pandemic, this did not happen.

=== 2011 Toyota Nascar 2JZ-GTE x Good Enough! x Gumout ===
For his YouTube channel series Good Enough!, Forsberg and the gang purchased an ex-Brandon McReynolds NASCAR. Forsberg took it to Irwindale Speedway with Ryan Tuerck. Forsberg did one 1/8th mile pass, with a 0.499 reaction, for a 7.9466 at 94.38 mph where they ultimately blew the engine. They swapped in a 2JZ-GTE making 750-800 horsepower; upgrades include Brian Crower rods, JE pistons, and a Garrett GTX4088 turbocharger.

=== 2006 Infiniti M56 "La Flama Blanca" (the Party Car) ===
The M56 is a four-seat demo drift car complete with a 500 hp VK56DE 5.6L V8 engine. Forsberg built this car in 2010 at his shop in Southern California as a four-seat ride-along vehicle. Forsberg custom designed and fabricated the roll cage so that all four bucket seats (Recaro SPG driver seat; SPG XL passenger seats) were able to fit safely and securely. Engine mods include Nissan Motorsports individual throttle-bodies, Jim Wolf camshafts, and custom Tri-Y exhaust, mounted to a 350Z transmission, an ACT twin disc clutch, and a custom Driveshaft Shop driveshaft and axles.

=== 2016 Chevrolet Silverado 1500 Jimmie Johnson x Valvoline ===
Valvoline asked Forsberg to upgrade a brand new Silverado and then take it out with NASCAR champion Jimmie Johnson. He orchestrated the entire build. Features include ICON Vehicle Dynamics suspension and wheels, tubular bumpers, Rigid LED lights, and some engine performance upgrades from K&N and Magnaflow. The truck was later given away in a sweepstakes.

=== 2009 Nissan 370Z Twin Turbo x Drift Garage ===
Drift Garage, a YouTube series produced by Network A was hosted by Forsberg and Ryan Tuerck. Along with friends Dylan Hughes (fabricator) and Brian Wilkerson from MA Motorsports, they built a "just for fun" demonstration car with a "might as well…" build philosophy.

The 370Z was gutted and rebuilt after the show. Some of its features include: VQ35HR engine, Fast Intentions Stage II turbo kit, SSR SP4s wheels with Hankook RS3 tires, Nismo body kit, Seibon Carbon fiber body panels.

=== 1988 Mazda "Forsberg’s First" RX7 ===
Forsberg purchased this car in March 2000 at age 17 with the intention of learning how to drift and took it to the first Club Loose events at Englishtown Raceway Park. Since then it has had four owners. In 2004, it nearly completed a full season of Formula Drift. In 2009 Forsberg purchased the car from Lindsay Ross, slowly bringing it back to life over 10 years. The goal was to create a 250 hp naturally aspirated, easy to drive weekender package rather than lots of power and speed.

== Motor Trend's "Drift This" ==
Drift This was a 2019 web series produced by Motor Trend featuring Forsberg and Ryan Tuerck. The premise was to take improbable drift car candidates and modify them "using creative engineering, custom fabrication, and pure brute horsepower."

Some of the vehicles featured in Drift This were a 35-foot Escalade limousine, a turbocharged LS UPS truck, a sandrail, a bubble Caprice, a military issue Humvee M998, and bumper cars.

== Formula Drift results, accolades and accomplishments ==
- ALL-TIME podium finisher in Formula Drift
- Most wins in head-to-head competition in Formula Drift
- Most consecutive podiums in Formula Drift (six)

=== 2003 ===
- Course designer and instructor at first organized East Coast events. (DGTrials 2003)
- Aces High member of DGTrials.
- Featured in October 2003 Wired magazine article on drifting, alongside Tony Angelo

=== 2004 ===
- 3rd OVERALL in Formula Drift Series Championship
- 2nd at inaugural Formula Drift, Road Atlanta
- 3rd at Formula Drift Round 2, Houston
- First American built drift car on the cover of a national magazine
- Only driver to defeat champion Samuel Hubinette in Formula D 2004 season competition.

=== 2005 ===
- Formula Drift Best Comeback of the Year
- 1st at Formula Drift Round 6, Irwindale
- 1st American to defeat a Japanese D1 driver in tandem competition
- 5th in first ever D1 Grand Prix US vs. Japan, Irwindale Speedway

=== 2006 ===
- Formula Drift Best Looking Car of the Year
- 1st at Formula Drift Team Drift, Long Beach
- 1st at World Drift Series Team Drift Beijing, China

=== 2007 ===
- TIRES.COM TRIPLE CROWN CHAMPION
- 2nd OVERALL in Formula Drift Series Championship
- 1st at Formula Drift Round 2, Road Atlanta
- 1st privately owned team to win a Formula Drift Pro Championship event
- Qualified 1st at Formula Drift Round 3, West Virginia
- 1st at Ziptied All Star Team Drift, Willow Springs
- 1st at Formula Drift Team Drift, San Jose
- 1st at Formula Drift Round 5, Infineon Raceway
- 2nd at Formula Drift Round 7, Irwindale Speedway
- Judge of the 2007 Drift Mania Canadian Championship series

=== 2008 ===
- 5th OVERALL in Formula Drift Series Championship
- 6th OVERALL in Formula Drift World Finals
- Nominated Team Owner of the Year
- 1st at Formula Drift Round 1, Long Beach Grand Prix
- 1st at Formula Drift Team Drift, Long Beach Grand Prix
- 1st in Formula Drift Team Drift Championship with Drift Alliance

=== 2009 ===
- FORMULA DRIFT CHAMPION
- TIRES.COM TRIPLE CROWN CHAMPION
- Formula Drift Driver of the Year
- Qualified 1st at Formula Drift Round 1, Long Beach
- 1st at Formula Drift Team Drift, Long Beach Grand Prix
- 1st at Formula Drift Round 2, Road Atlanta
- 3rd at Formula Drift Round 4, Las Vegas
- 1st at Formula Drift Round 5, Seattle

=== 2010 ===
- 6th OVERALL in Formula Drift Series Championship
- 1st at Formula Drift Team Drift, Long Beach Grand Prix
- 3rd at Formula Drift Round 2, Road Atlanta
- Judge of the Xtreme Drift Circuit Championship series

=== 2011 ===
- 3rd OVERALL in Formula Drift Series Championship
- Formula Drift Team Manager of the Year
- 2nd at Formula Drift Abu Dhabi, Yas Marina
- Qualified 1st at Formula Drift Round 3, West Palm Beach
- 2nd at Formula Drift Round 5, Seattle
- 3rd at Formula Drift Round 7, Irwindale
- Judge of the Xtreme Drift Circuit Championship series

=== 2012 ===
- 2nd at Formula Drift Round 3, West Palm Beach
- 3rd at Formula Drift Round 4, Wall

=== 2013 ===
- 2nd OVERALL in Formula Drift Series Championship
- Formula Drift Ace of the Year
- 3rd at Formula Drift Round 1, Long Beach
- 3rd at Formula Drift Round 4, Wall
- 1st at Formula Drift Round 5, Seattle
- 3rd at Formula Drift Round 6, Dallas

=== 2014 ===
- FORMULA DRIFT CHAMPION
- Formula Drift Top Qualifier of the Year
- 1st at Formula Drift Round 1, Long Beach
- 3rd at Formula Drift Round 2, Road Atlanta
- 2nd at Formula Drift Round 3, Miami
- 2nd at Formula Drift Round 4, Wall
- 3rd at Formula Drift Round 5, Seattle
- 3rd at Formula Drift Round 6, Texas Motor Speedway
- 2nd at Irish Drift Championship Finale, Mondello Park, Ireland
- 2nd at Red Bull Drift Shifters, New Zealand

=== 2015 ===
- 3rd OVERALL in Formula Drift Series Championship
- 3rd at Formula Drift Round 2, Road Atlanta
- 2nd at Formula Drift Round 3, Orlando
- 3rd at Formula Drift Round 6, Texas Motor Speedway

=== 2016 ===
- FORMULA DRIFT WORLD CHAMPION
- FORMULA DRIFT CHAMPION
- Formula Drift Ace of the Year
- 3rd at Formula Drift Round 2, Atlanta
- 3rd at Formula Drift Round 3, Miami
- 2nd at Formula Drift Round 4, Wall
- 2nd at Formula Drift Round 5, Canada
- 2nd at Formula Drift Round 6, Seattle
- 2nd at Formula Drift Round 7, Dallas

=== 2017 ===
- Invited to run at the prestigious Goodwood Festival of Speed
- 2nd at Formula Drift Round 6, Dallas

=== 2018 ===
- 1st at Formula Drift Round 2, Orlando
- 3rd at Formula Drift Round 3, Atlanta

=== 2019 ===
- 3rd at Formula Drift Round 1, Long Beach
- 2nd at Formula Drift Round 2, Orlando
- 3rd at Formula Drift Round 7, Texas

=== 2020 ===
- Formula Drift Hardest Charger of the Year
- 2nd at Formula Drift Round 5, Dallas
- 1st at Formula Drift Round 6, Dallas

=== 2021 ===
- Formula Drift Comeback of the Year
- 2nd at Formula Drift Round 4, Englishtown

=== 2022 ===
- 2nd at Formula Drift Round 2, Atlanta
- 2nd at Formula Drift Round 3, Orlando
- 3rd at Formula Drift Round 6, Seattle

== Miscellaneous events, demos, and exhibitions ==
- 2018 - 2019 D1 China (BMW M4 2JZ, 3rd overall)
- 2017 - 2018 Goodwood Festival of Speed (attendee)
- 2016 SCORE Baja 1,000 (DNF)
- 2016 Battle BROyale (Can-Am Maverick X3)
- 2015 Belarus
- 2014 Irish Drift Championship (engine seize)
- 2014 Red Bull Drift Shifters New Zealand (2nd place)
- 2012 China World Drift Series: Team Drift (winner)
- 2011 Formula Drift Abu Dhabi: Yas Marina Circuit
- 2008 Chile Super Drift (Nissan 350Z SR20DET)
- 2008 Panama X-treme Wheels and Drift (Nissan 350Z SR20DET)
- 2006 - 2007 El Salvador (Nissan S13 VQ )
- 2006 China World Drift Series Team Drift (winner)
- 2005 Costa Rica (Nissan B210)
- 2005 - 2009 Indy Car/CHAMP Exhibitions: Texas Motor Speedway Ultimate Drifting
