= Chris Rado =

American racing driver

Christian Rado
- Nationality: American
- Born: July 30, 1975 (age 51) Pennsylvania, U.S.

Global Time Attack Time Attack
- Teams: WORLD Racing
- Starts: 109
- Wins: 78
- Poles: 45
- Fastest laps: See achievements below

Previous series
- 2008, 2009, 2010: Redline Time Attack Super Lap Battle

Championship titles
- 2009, 2010: Unlimited FWD Champion

Christian Rado (born July 30, 1975, in Reading, Pennsylvania) is a professional racing driver from the United States.

Rado is chiefly notable for his participation in import drag racing, previously piloting a factory backed Scion tC in the Pro FWD category in the NHRA Sports Compact series for his own team, WORLD Racing in addition to other series such as the NOPI Drag Racing Series and Battle of the Imports. In addition to this, Rado also participates in time attack events in a tC particularly in Global Time Attack (GTA) time attack and Super Street Super Lap Battles. His business ventures includes his cannabis company, Vaporous Technology, which he pioneered to provide black label hardware to major brands in the industry.

Beside his factory sponsor, Rado's sponsors include WORLD electronics, Lincoln Technical Institute, Descendant Racing, EA Sports, Alpinestars, HRE Performance Wheels, Brian Crower (BC), STACK, ScionLife.com, Deatschwerks Injectors, Golden Eagle Mfg., Isha Foundation, JE Pistons, Turbonetics, Spearco Intercoolers, Need for Speed (video game), Mishimoto Automotive, Brembo, Penske Racing Shocks and Continental Tire.

== History ==
Established in 1999 by Chris Rado, WORLD Racing, WORLD Motorsports and Vaporous (their cannabis company) headquartered in Torrance, CA, with a second facility in Reading, PA.

== Achievements ==
=== 2012 ===
• New FWD Record 1:25.555 Road Atlanta, Braselton, GA.
• New FWD Record 1:20.810 Palm Beach International Raceway, Jupiter, FL.

=== 2011 ===
• New FWD Record 1:05.481 New Jersey Motorsports Park – Millville, NJ.
• New FWD Record 1:47.394 Buttonwillow Raceway - Buttonwillow, CA.
• New FWD Record 1:45.320 Infineon Raceway – Sonoma, CA.
• New FWD Record 2:16.585 Sebring International Raceway - Sebring, FL.
• Rado to be featured in Need for Speed - The Run video game with his 2,500HP V-8 powered Supra street car.
• Rado to be featured in Shift 2: Unleashed video game in the Time Attack and spoke about it and with his 1,200HP Team Need for Speed AWD Scion tC.
• Rado to speak on Capital Hill regarding his Lincoln Technical Institute "Success Story" in early February 2012.
• Performance Auto & Sound Magazine – November 2011 Cover and Feature Article -Team Need for Speed, Fwing 2.0 Scion tC.

=== 2010 ===
• New FWD Record 1:21.910 Willow Springs International Raceway, Rosamond, CA.
• New FWD Record 1:46.730 Buttonwillow Raceway Park, Buttonwillow, CA - 1st Place
• New FWD Record 1:26.226 Road Atlanta, Braselton, GA
• New FWD Record 2:16.585 Sebring International Raceway, Sebring, FL
• August, 2010 competition debut for the 2010 Team Need For Speed All-Wheel Drive Scion tC - Road Atlanta, Braselton, GA
• Modified Magazine November, 2010 – Fire in the Hole – Cover/Feature - 2010 Team Need For Speed Scion tC

=== 2009 ===
•1st Place. New FWD Record 1:03.623 Phoenix International Raceway, AZ, taking first overall.
•1st Place. New FWD Record 2.27.xxx Spring Mountain Motorsprots Park Pahrump, NV.
•1st Place. New FWD Record 1:35.989 Carolina Motorsports Park, SC, taking 3rd overall.
•1st Place. New FWD Record 1:03.084 Nashville Super Speedway, TN, taking 2nd overall.
•1st Place. New FWD Record 1:22.623 Willow Springs, Rosemond, CA, taking 5th overall.
•1st Place. New FWD Record 1:30.717 Autobahn Country Club, Joliet, IL.

=== 2008 ===
• Broke his record from the previous year at Willow Springs International Motorsports Park. He currently holds the title of the fasted lap in the FWD Unlimited Class with a time of 1:27.30

• 1st Place FWD Record Summit Point Motorsports Park

=== 2007 ===
• Set a new lap record for FWD with a 1:29.34 and took first place at Willow Springs.
• Fastest in a FWD car 7.34 seconds in the 1/4 mile

=== 2006 ===
• Pepsi spokesperson for Car Culture & Street Motion Tour
• Factory Scion tC Drag Program spokesperson
• Raced in the NDRA & NHRA Drag Series
• Large presence with race and project vehicles at major car shows including: DUB, Hot Import Nights, Hot Import Days & the Super Street Tour

=== 2005 ===
• MTV Special: Life in the Fast Lane- documenting the wild lifestyle and heavy foot of Pro Drag Racer Chris Rado. The show has resulted in some of the highest ratings on MTV and MTV2, introducing the sport compact era to mainstream TV

=== 2004 ===
• 4 event Wins
• 2 event Runners-up
• #1 Qualifier in 8 straight events
• NHRA points Championship Runner-Up in Pro FWD
• NDRA points Championship Runner-Up in Pro FWD
• NDRA National ET & MPH record holder

=== 2003 ===
• First NHRA Sports Compact Toyota factory-team driver
• Toyota development and transition year in NHRA
• 4 event Wins

=== 2002 ===
• "Quickest & Fastest Pro FWD unibody vehicle in the World"
• First PRO FWD into the "8s" (8.91 @ 159.8 MPH)
• Held the World Speed Record (8.94 @ 161.8 MPH)
• NIRA Points Championship Runner-Up in Pro FWD
• 6 event wins

=== 2001 ===
• "Quickest and Fastest Pro FWD uni-body"
• 8 event wins
• World Record Speed for uni-body Pro FWD (9.25 sec. / 159 MPH)
• NHRA Points Championship runner-up in Pro FWD

=== 1999 ===
• 10 event wins
• Super Street "Rookie of the Year"
• First NHRA import winner
