= Yokohama Rubber Company =

Japanese tire and rim manufacturing company

The Yokohama Rubber Co., Ltd.
- Native name: 横浜ゴム株式会社
- Romanized name: Yokohama Gomu Kabushiki gaisha
- Type: Public K.K.
- Traded as: TYO: 5101
- Industry: Manufacturing
- Founded: October 13, 1917; 109 years ago
- Headquarters: Hiratsuka, Japan
- Key people: Masataka Yamaishi (President, Chairman of the Board)
- Products: Tires, rims, golf equipment, industrial rubber products
- Brands: Advan; AVID; AVS; BluEarth; Geolandar; IceGuard; Parada; PRGR; S.drive
- Revenue: ▲US$5.93 billion (2022)
- Operating income: ▲US$483.69 million (2022)
- Net income: ▲US$325.38 million (2022)
- Number of employees: 27,222 (as of December 2021)
- Website: www.y-yokohama.com www.yokohamatire.com

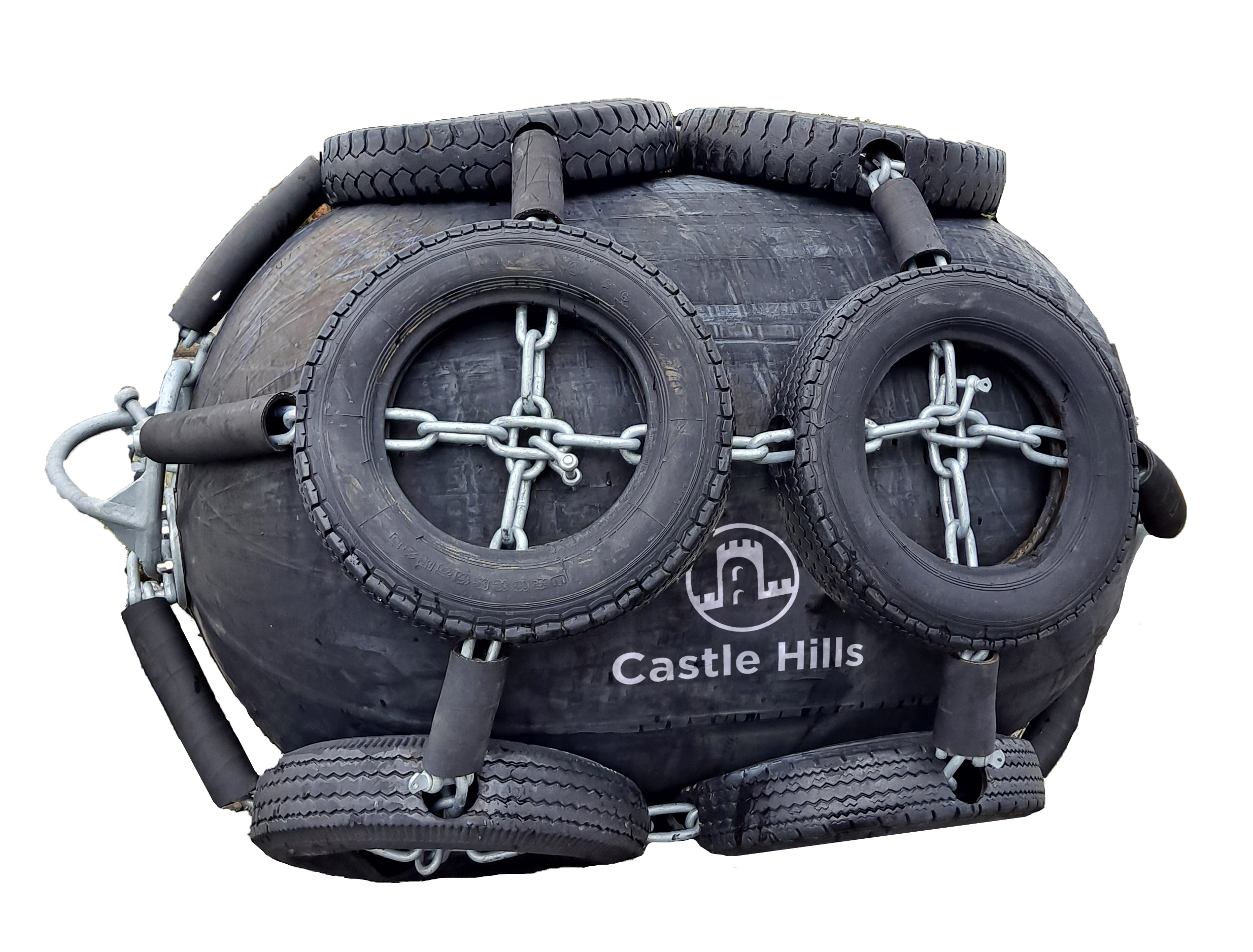
Yokohama fender, produced as a part of the company's series of maritime industry products

The Yokohama Rubber Company, Limited (横浜ゴム株式会社, Yokohama Gomu Kabushiki gaisha) is a Japanese manufacturing company based in Hiratsuka, Japan. The company was founded and began on October 13, 1917, in a joint venture between Yokohama Cable Manufacturing and BFGoodrich. In 1969, the company expanded to the United States as Yokohama Tire Corporation. It primarily produces tires, rims, and golf equipment (sold under the brand PRGR).

The company has one manufacturing facility in the United States in West Point, Mississippi. A previous facility in Salem, Virginia, closed in March of 2026.

== History ==
- 1917 – Established in Yokohama as 橫濱護謨製造株式會社 (Yokohama Rubber Manufacturing Co., Ltd.), a joint venture between 橫濱電線製造 (Yokohama Electric Cable Manufacturing Company, currently Furukawa Electric Co., Ltd.) and BF Goodrich Company.
- 1920 – Built a factory in Hiranuma, Yokohama. Installed US-made refining equipment and manufacturing equipment. Started manufacturing rubber belts, tires, hoses, etc. (At this time, tires of this company are sold in Japan under the "Goodrich" brand)
- 1929 – Built a new Yokohama Factory in Heian-cho, Tsurumi-ku, Yokohama.
- 1937 – Changed the tire brand to "Yokohama".
- 1942 – Built a rubber factory in Singapore.
- 1943 – Built a factory in Mie prefecture.
- 1946 – Built a factory in Mishima, Shizuoka Prefecture.
- 1950 – Stocks listed on the Tokyo Stock Exchange and the Osaka Securities Exchange.
- 1963 – Company name changed from 横浜護謨製造株式会社 (Yokohama Rubber Manufacturing Co., Ltd.) to 横浜ゴム株式会社(Yokohama Rubber Company, Limited).
- 1964 – Built a factory in Shinshiro, Aichi Prefecture.
- 1969 – Established Yokohama Tire Corporation in the United States.
- 1974 – Launched the Yokohama Wheel brand.
- 1981 - BFGoodrich sells all shares in Yokohama.
- 1983 - Launched Performance Y logo for the Yokohama Performance Radials and PRGR ranges; later became corporate logo.
- 1983 - Launched the PRGR brand of golf equipment.
- 2007 – Established Yokohama India.
- 2016 - Yokohama Rubber acquired farm tire maker Alliance Tire Group for $1.18 billion.
- On March 25, 2022, Yokohama Rubber announced it would be acquiring Trelleborg Wheel Systems from Trelleborg for 2.1 billion euro ($2.31 billion), its largest acquisition to date.
- On December 26, 2025, a former employee stabbed eight of his co-workers and injured seven others from a chemical spray in the Mishima factory.

== Tires ==
Yokohama Tire Company develops a range of tires for passenger vehicles, crossover utility vehicles (CUVs), sport utility vehicles (SUVs), electric vehicles, commercial trucks, motorsport applications, and off-road use. The company organizes its consumer tire portfolio into several product families designed for different driving conditions and vehicle types.

=== ADVAN ===
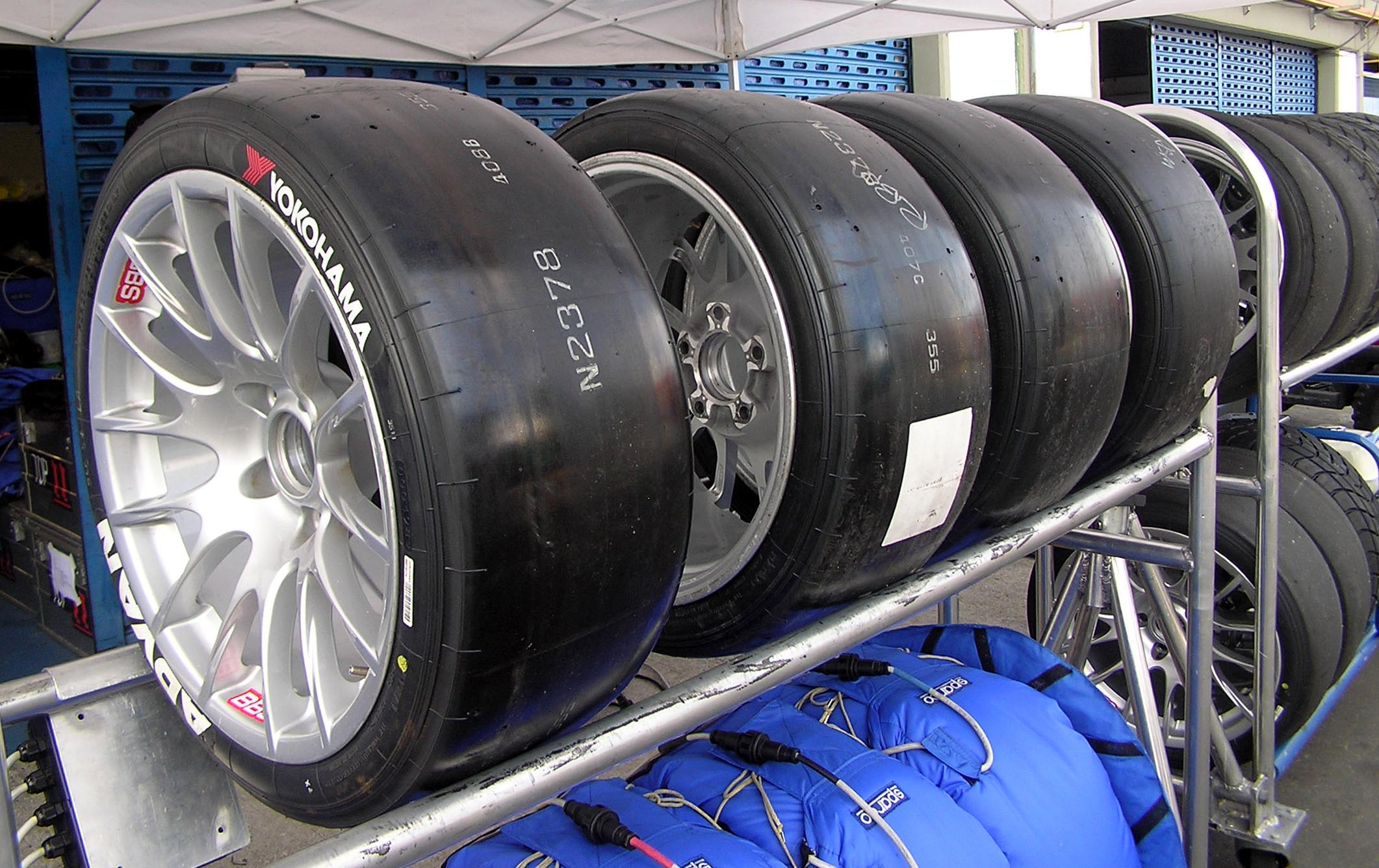
Yokohama ADVAN racing tires

The ADVAN family is the company’s performance-oriented tire line. It includes summer tires and all-season tires intended for sports cars, luxury sedans, and high-performance vehicles. ADVAN tires are designed to provide handling precision, cornering stability, and high-speed capability. Products in this line have been used in various forms of motorsport, including grand touring (GT) racing and time attack events, and are also supplied as original equipment on some performance vehicles.

=== GEOLANDAR ===
The GEOLANDAR family is designed primarily for SUVs, pickup trucks, and crossover vehicles. It includes tires suited for all-terrain, mud-terrain, and highway-terrain use, supporting driving on surfaces such as dirt, gravel, and mixed on- and off-road conditions.

=== AVID ===
The AVID family consists of all-season touring tires for passenger vehicles, including sedans, compact cars, and CUVs. The line includes products intended for general driving conditions, with characteristics such as tread durability, ride comfort, and performance in dry and wet conditions.

=== Commercial and industrial tire lines ===
The company also produces tires for commercial and industrial applications, including trucks, buses, and specialized equipment. These tires are designed for uses such as long-haul transportation, regional distribution, construction, and port operations, with emphasis on durability, tread longevity, and retreadability.

== Wheels ==
Under the Yokohama Wheel brand Almex, Yokohama Rubber Co., Ltd. began making rims in 1974. The Yokohama Wheel brand currently produces the Advan Racing wheel brand for performance and motorsport applications, the AVS brand for premium applications, and the Kreutzer brand for luxury applications.

== Motorsports ==
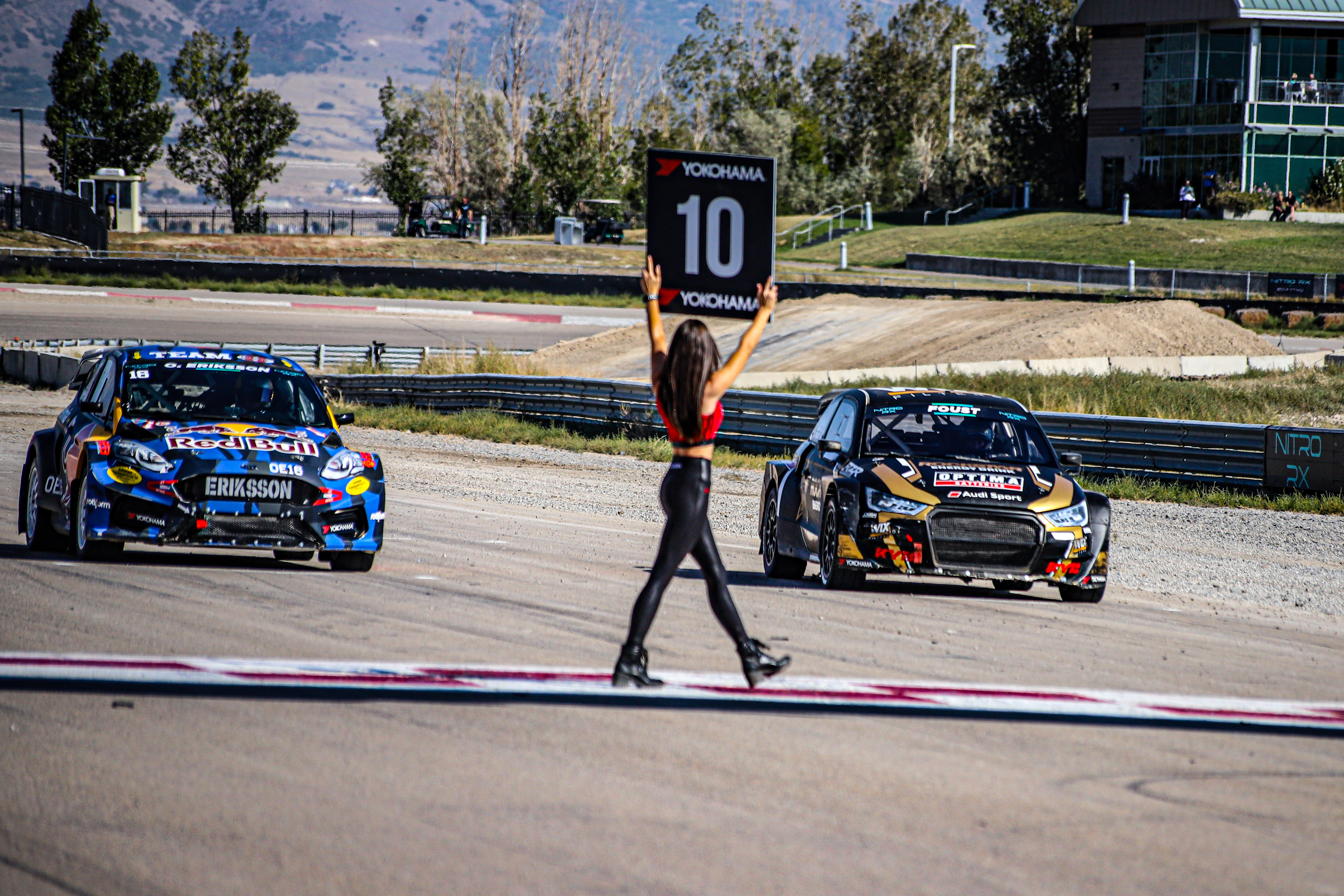
An example of Yokohama sponsorship in racing at a Nitro Rallycross event

Yokohama is the official tire supplier of the Super Formula Championship since 2016. In the Japanese Super GT, it supplies the Bandoh GT500 team and several GT300 teams. The company makes D1 Grand Prix and Formula Drift Japan tires for Daigo Saito among other drivers. It was the official tire supplier of the Macau Grand Prix Formula 3 race from 1983 until 2019, with an exception in 2016, when Pirelli was chosen for the tire supplier that year.

The company was the supplier of the World Touring Car Championship and World Touring Car Cup from 2006 until 2019. It currently supplies tires to 24 Hours of Nürburgring and Nürburgring Langstrecken Series competitors, including BMW and Ford factory-supported teams.

In the United States, Yokohama was a tire supplier in the American Le Mans Series, including PTG (from 2005 to 2009) and Alex Job Racing. It was the official tire supplier of the IMSA GT3 Cup Challenge, and continues that role in the Porsche Carrera Cup North America and Porsche Sprint Challenge North America.

Yokohama has been a tire supplier of Subaru Motorsports USA and of Pikes Peak International Hill Climb competitors such as Robb Holland, Billy Johnson and Daijiro Yoshihara. It has also participated in Redline Time Attack, Nitro Rallycross and Stadium Super Trucks. The company is a sponsor and supplier of North American desert competitions including the Championship Off-Road, Best in the Desert, Unlimited Off-Road Racing and Mexican 1000.

In September 2025, Yokohama was announced as the official tire supplier for the FIA Extreme H World Cup and will use a prototype tire based on the Geolandar X-AT.

== Sponsorship ==
From 2015 to 2020, Yokohama was the main sponsor of Premier League football club Chelsea. Yokohama also sponsors the NBA teams the Boston Celtics and the San Antonio Spurs.

== Logos ==
The Yokohama Rubber logo was first displayed in the Tokyo Asahi Shimbun newspaper in 1917. The company used it until 1987. In 1983, Yokohama launched the "Performance Y" logo for its Yokohama Performance Radials series, which became its corporate logo in 1987. A similar style logo is used by the Taiwanese tire company Nankang Rubber Tire.

Yokohama Tire company logo through 1987

Yokohama Tire "Performance Y" since 1983 on tires, since 1987 as corporate logo

Nankang Rubber Tire logo

Yokohama Tire company logo in China (Chinese: 优科豪马轮胎; pinyin: Yōukēháomǎlúntāi)
