= Super Lap Battle =

The Super Lap Battle Finals are a time attack event held at Buttonwillow Raceway Park near Bakersfield, California. This competition is fielded largely by privateer teams racing unibody-based production vehicles.

== History ==
Beginning in 2004, The Sport Compact Car and Superstreet magazine sponsored Super Lap Battle finals are typically held just before SEMA, which lands in November of each year. The event was held twice in its inaugural year and with the exception of non-finals events being held at other venues, the Super Lap Battle finals have since been run once a year on Buttonwillow's Clockwise 13-turn (CW13) configuration.

Borrowing heavily from the Hyper Rev Super Battle held at Tsukuba Circuit in Japan, its prominence has been bolstered by numerous visiting world-class time attack teams. The most notable visiting team has arguably been the Japanese HKS team and their Mitsubishi Evolution "C230R", which made its way to Buttonwillow Raceway Park in 2007, lapping the course in 1 min 43.523 sec which was five seconds quicker than the previous record set by the Japanese Sun Auto "Cyber Evo" team in 2004. The HKS C230R record lap triggered an aggressive response by American competitors to regain the title.

After nearly three years of progressive development and failed attempts at regaining the Super Lap Battle record from HKS, the lap time was finally bested by a substantial margin at the 2010 event by Sierra Sierra Enterprises' Mitsubishi Lancer Evolution and Factor X Motorsports Development's Acura NSX, muscling their way to lap times of 1:41.056 and 1:41.949 respectively.

The event was previously sanctioned by the National Auto Sport Association. Since 2019 it is sanctioned by the Sports Car Club of America.

== Notable Japanese teams ==
- Signal Auto Nissan Skyline GT-R R34
- Sun Auto "Cyber Evo" Mitsubishi Evolution VII, Eiji "Tarzan" Yamada(2004)
- HKS C230R Mitsubishi Evolution VIII, Nobuteru Taniguchi (2007)
- Cusco/Tomei Powered Subaru Impreza STI, Eiji "Tarzan" Yamada(2009)
- 5Zigen Honda Accord Euro R

== Notable American teams ==
- Sierra Sierra Enterprises Mitsubishi Lancer Evolution VIII, David "Emp" Empringham (Overall Record, Unlimited AWD Standing Record)
- Factor X Motorsports Development NSX, Billy Johnson (Unlimited FR Standing Record)
- World Racing Scion tC "Fwing", Chris Rado (Unlimited FF Standing Record)
