= Scion Fuse =

Compact coupe concept car

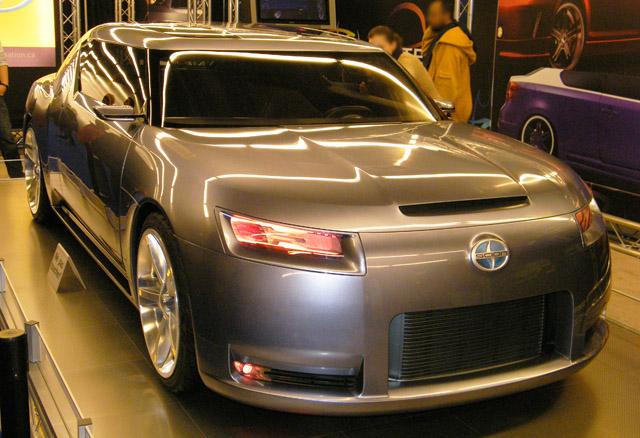

Overview
- Manufacturer: Scion
- Production: 2006 (Concept car)

Body and chassis
- Class: Sport compact car
- Body style: 2-door coupe
- Layout: FF layout

Powertrain
- Engine: 2.4L I4

Dimensions
- Wheelbase: 106.3 in (2,700 mm)
- Length: 174.0 in (4,420 mm)
- Width: 70.7 in (1,796 mm)
- Height: 52.1 in (1,323 mm)

The Scion Fuse is a concept car created under one of Toyota's brands, Scion.

The Fuse was built by Five Axis Models in Huntington Beach, CA with assistance from MillenWorks. It was introduced at the 2006 New York International Auto Show and is a 2-door coupe, with 4 seats and scissor doors.

The Fuse uses a DOHC gasoline I4 engine with multi-port fuel-injection and VVT-i. The engine's compression ratio is 9.6:1, and rated at 160 hp (119 kW) and 163 lb⋅ft (221 N⋅m) of torque.

The Fuse has steer-by-wire, retractable spoiler, power-operated hatch that slides upwards,, flip-out bench for tailgating, beverage cooler, Wi-Fi connection, LED lighting e.g. in the seat piping and wheels, programmable multi color headlights and passenger seat that folds into a footrest or table.

The 2011 Scion tC was modelled on the Fuse.
