= Scion Hako Coupe =

Japanese compact hatchback concept

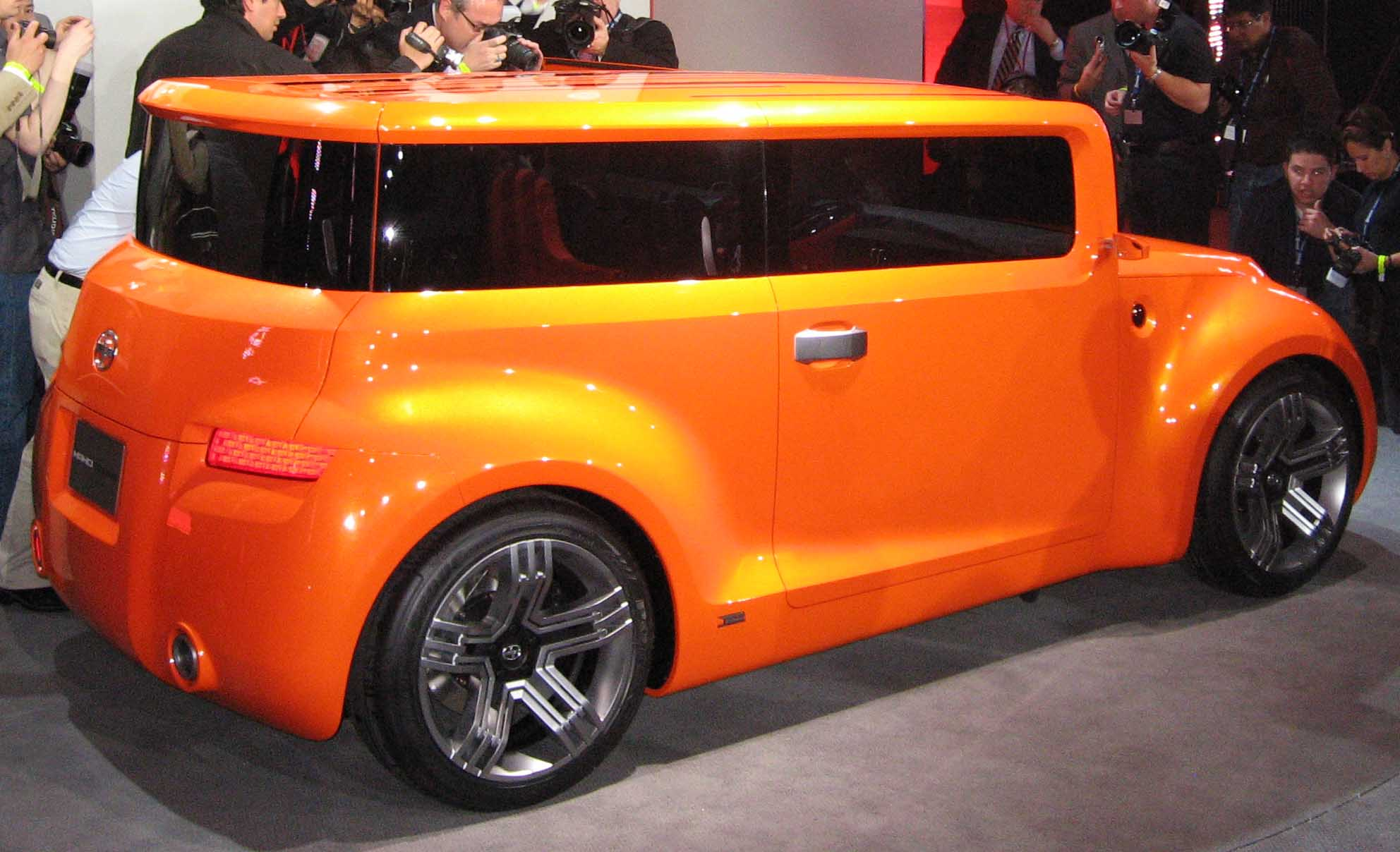

Overview
- Manufacturer: Scion
- Production: 2008 (concept car)

Body and chassis
- Class: Sport compact car
- Body style: 3-door hatchback
- Layout: FF layout

Dimensions
- Wheelbase: 94.5 in (2,400 mm)
- Length: 145.7 in (3,701 mm)
- Width: 74.0 in (1,880 mm)
- Height: 57.5 in (1,460 mm)

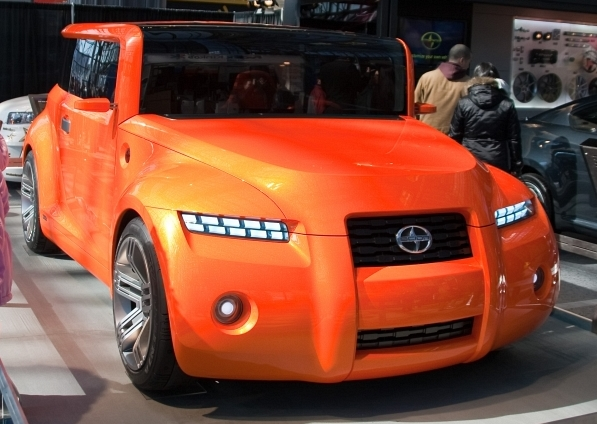
Scion Hako Coupe at the 2008 New York International Auto Show

The Scion Hako Coupe is a concept car unveiled by the automaker Scion at the 2008 New York International Auto Show. Inspired by the Scion xB and the emergence of American vintage style amongst young Tokyo trendsetters, Tokyo Design Division developed the Hako Coupe with classic American coupes in mind. This retro-style automobile is named for its square, "boxy" appearance and features wraparound glass windows. The front passenger cabin features two dash-mounted video screens, while the rear cabin contains side-mounted video screens.

== Sources ==
- Scion
