= Scion (automobile) =

Automobile marque from Toyota for US and Canada

- Type: Marque
- Industry: Automotive industry
- Founded: 2003; 23 years ago
- Fate: Absorbed back into Toyota in 2016, name reintroduced in 2026
- Headquarters: Torrance, California, U.S.
- Area served: United States and Canada
- Key people: Andrew Gilleland (VP, US)
- Parent: Toyota

Scion is a marque of Toyota that debuted in 2003, discontinued in 2016, and reintroduced in 2026 as "Scion by Toyota". It was available only in the United States and Canada.

During its first iteration, the marque was intended to appeal to millennials; emphasizing inexpensive, stylish, and distinctive sport compact vehicles using a simplified "pure price" sales concept that eschewed traditional trim levels and dealer haggling. Each vehicle was offered in a single trim with a non-negotiable base price, while a range of dealer-installed options was offered to buyers for personalizing their vehicles. The Scion name, meaning the descendant of a family or heir, refers both to the brand's cars and their owners. In its effort to target millennials, Scion primarily relied on guerrilla and viral marketing techniques.

The brand first soft launched in the United States at selected Toyota dealers in the state of California in June 2003, before expanding nationwide by February 2004. Sales peaked in 2006 with 173,034 units sold. In 2010, Scion expanded into Canada. However, Toyota's initial propositions of short product cycles and aggressive pricing based on low dealer margins became increasingly unsustainable as sales fell after the 2008 financial crisis. Toyota abolished the Scion brand at the start of the 2017 model year in August 2016; the vehicles were either rebranded as Toyotas or discontinued.

In November 2026, the Scion name was reintroduced in the United States as "Scion by Toyota", focusing on niche, low-volume low-speed vehicles. Its first product is the KEI-01, a rebadged version of the Daihatsu Hijet / Toyota Pixis Truck kei truck.

== History ==
In 1999, Toyota launched Project Genesis, an effort to bring younger buyers to the Toyota marque in the United States. This project aimed to create a "marque within a marque" in sales and advertising strategy for compact and coupe models sold by Toyota. The effort, which included the introduction of the Toyota Echo economy car, along with late generation Toyota MR-2 and Toyota Celica models, was judged unsuccessful and cancelled in 2001. In response, Toyota chose to launch a separate marque, an effort called Project Exodus. A Los Angeles-based digital design company, Fresh Machine, was retained by Toyota to develop the brand, logo, and website. This project became known as Scion. Toyota had previously participated in a project in Japan with other Japanese companies who attempted to market products to younger buyers. Toyota manufactured three vehicles under the WiLL brandname, which were exclusive to Toyota Netz Store Japanese dealerships.

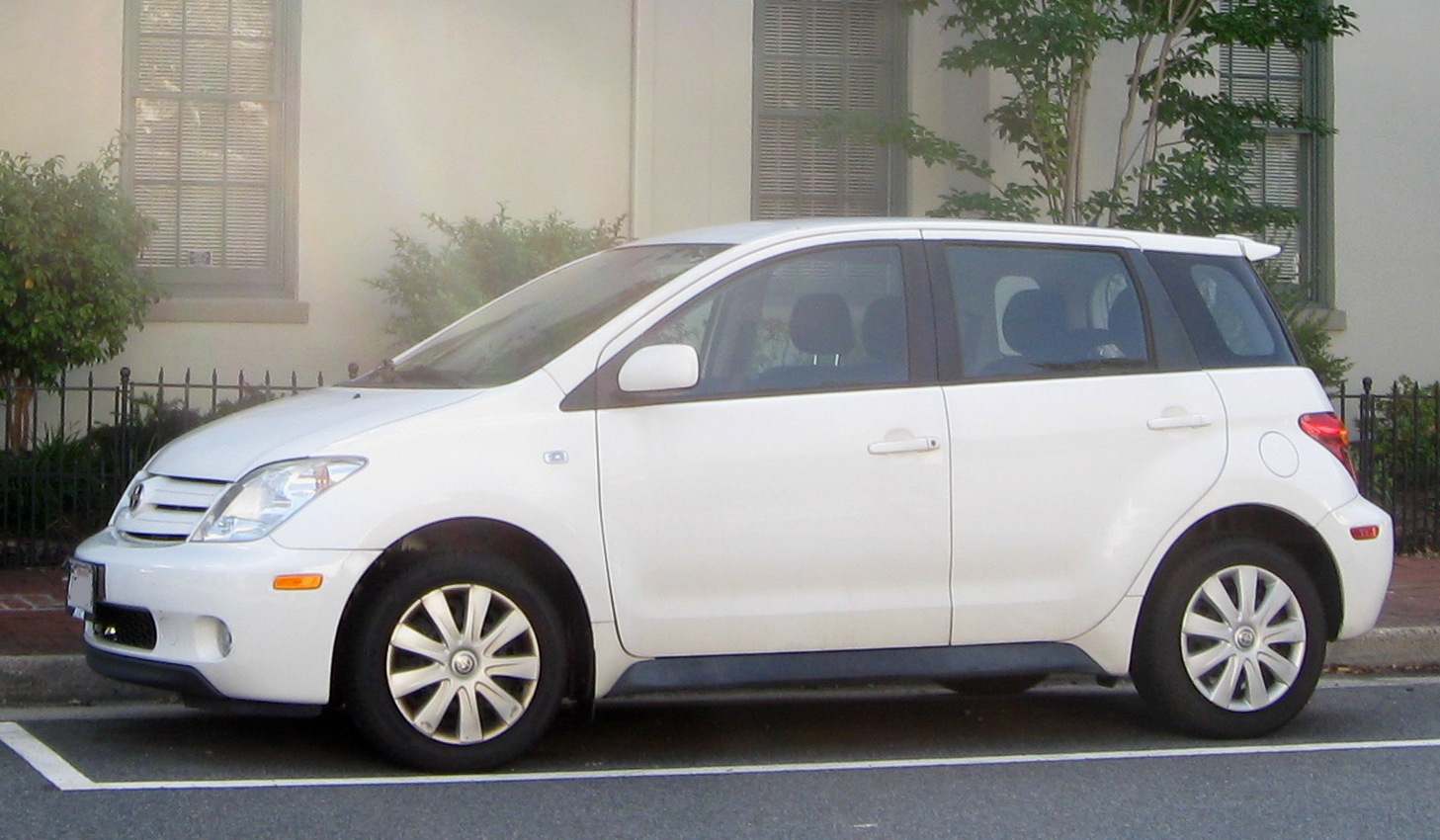
Scion xA

Scion was marketed as a youth brand and was first introduced in March 2002, at the New York Auto Show. There were just two concept vehicles, the bbX (which became the xB), and the ccX (which became the tC). The 2004 xA and xB were unveiled at the Greater Los Angeles Auto Show on January 2, 2003. They were available only in 105 Toyota dealerships in California at their initial launch on June 9, 2003. The subsequent rollout of the brand to the South, the Southeast, and the East Coast occurred in February 2004. Scion vehicles were available nationwide in June 2004, coinciding with the release of the 2005 tC. On December 16, 2006, Scion unveiled the next-generation xB, based on the t2B concept, and the new xD, successor of the xA, at an invitation-only, no-camera event in Miami. Both cars were then publicly unveiled on February 8, 2007, at the Chicago Auto Show. The xD, a five-door subcompact car that is sold in Japan as the second generation Toyota Ist, was based on the Yaris platform with the tenth-generation Corolla's engine.

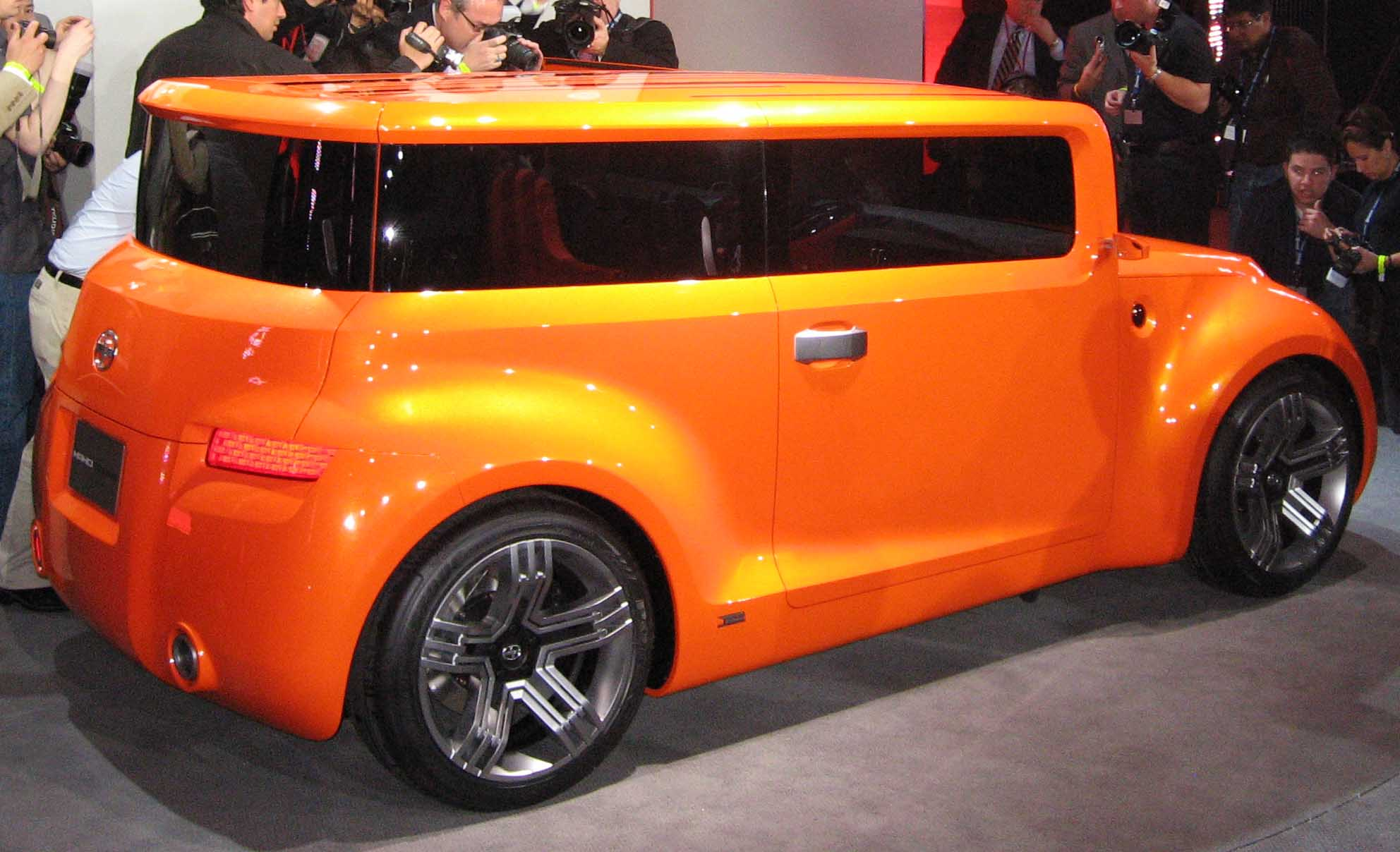
Scion Hako concept

In September 2010, Scion expanded into Canada, with vehicles offered at 45 selected dealers starting in Toronto, Montreal, and Vancouver, followed by other cities. Launch models included the tC, xD, and xB. The first new Scions were shown in Canada at the 2009 Montreal International Auto Show.

=== Struggles ===
Sales of the Scion brand were down to a low of 45,678 for the 2010 model year, compared to over 170,000 for 2006. The management tried to resuscitate the brand, hoping to sell 35,000 to 45,000 tC in a year after the model was redesigned for 2011. In October 2011, the iQ, an ultra-compact city car, debuted as a 2012 model. In April 2012, Jack Hollis (Vice President of Scion) announced that the xB and xD would be dropped after 2012, supposedly in favor of all new models from Toyota's hatchback division, Daihatsu; the same month, the FR-S sports car went on sale as a 2013 model. Later in 2012—despite the announcement of its imminent discontinuation—a facelifted version of the xB was unveiled.

In late 2013, the xD and second-generation xB were in their seventh year without a substantial redesign, and Scion sales were still far short of their 2006 peak. Toyota began allowing dealers to drop the Scion marque without penalty. The recently introduced FR-S had strong initial sales, but combined sales of the new FR-S and redesigned tC did not equal sales of the tC alone during 2005 through 2008, and industry observers concluded that the FR-S was cannibalizing sales of the similar tC. iQ sales never met expectations, and by 2014, observers were characterizing it as a "disappointment." A primary goal of the Scion brand was to introduce young first-time buyers to Toyota products, but analysts found that relatively few Scion buyers were making follow-on purchases from the more profitable Toyota and Lexus lines, and Gen Y buyers were generally making more pragmatic car-buying choices than their predecessors due to economic factors.

For the 2015 model year, Scion released the iM hatchback, based on the international Toyota Auris, and the iQ, xB, and xD were discontinued. Scion also introduced the iA sedan, a rebadged version of the Mazda2; however, Toyota opted to sell the iA as the Toyota Yaris sedan in Canada.

=== Discontinuation ===
On February 3, 2016, Toyota announced that the Scion brand would be phased out in August after the 2016 model year, stating that the company no longer required a specific marque to target younger demographics. The FR-S, iA, and iM models were amalgamated into the Toyota marque for the 2017 model year as the Toyota 86, Toyota Yaris iA, and Toyota Corolla iM respectively, while the tC was discontinued. The then-upcoming C-HR was also moved to the Toyota marque after originally being unveiled as a Scion. The change was not expected to cause disruption to service options, as Scion models were sold and serviced at Toyota dealerships.

=== Revival ===
On November 9, 2026, Toyota reintroduced the Scion name as Scion by Toyota. It is intended as an experimental brand, with Toyota describing the brand as a "freedom lab" for exploring new approaches to mobility, adventure and personal expression through vehicle concepts and designs.

Its first model is a kei truck called the "KEI-01", a rebadged Daihatsu Hijet Truck built at Toyota's Indiana factory in Princeton. It is kept as a right-hand-drive vehicle, and designed to comply with the federal safety requirements for low-speed vehicles (FMVSS No. 500), which limits its top speed to 25 mph (40 km/h). It will initially be sold to fleet customers through a small number of Scion by Toyota dealers selected from the existing Toyota dealer network, with limited retail sales to be considered at a later date.

Toyota also showed two concepts alongside the KEI-01. The SxS Concept is an off-road side-by-side, first shown at the 2025 SEMA Show, with a turbocharged four-cylinder hybrid powertrain producing more than 300 hp (220 kW) and an electric-only "Silent Mode", while the BKE Concept explores "compact personal mobility".

== Leadership ==
- Jim Lentz (2003–2008)
- Mark Templin (2008–2012)
- Doug Murtha (2012–2015)
- Andrew Gilleland (2015–2016)

== Pricing, accessories, and availability ==
Scion used sales tools such as "Pure Price" and monospec trim levels with a wide selection of factory and TRD accessories. Extensive market research and testing with Generation Y consumers formed the basis of the Scion badge.

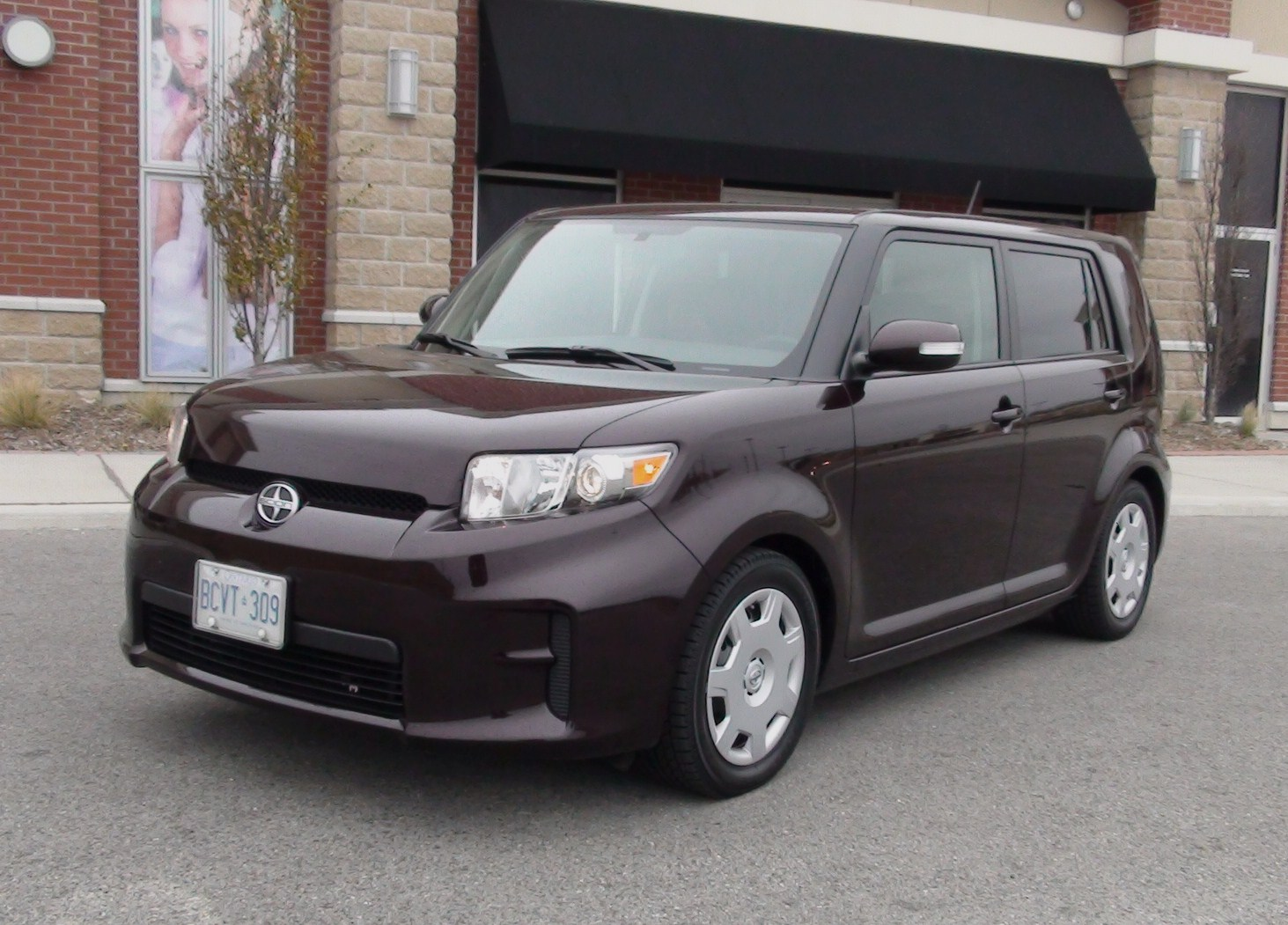
Scion xB

"Pure Price" means that the price posted, whether on the vehicle, in an advertisement, or on a menu display board in the dealership, was the price customers would pay. This included the vehicle, accessories, finance and insurance products. Pure Price was designed to ensure a shorter and simpler process, eliminating all negotiation, though it was common for dealers to add aftermarket accessories and mark vehicles up to increase profits. The concept aimed to be open and consistent to all customers. The concept was not new to the U.S. market, having been introduced in the early 1990s by the Geo and Saturn marques of General Motors.

Scion's sales approach differed greatly from that of the Toyota brand. In the United States, for instance, the Toyota Camry was offered with four different trim levels intended for different crowds (budget-conscious, mainstream, sports-oriented and luxury); all Scions, in contrast, had only one standard trim level (monospec) and were designed to be uniquely customized for the driver.

== Post-production accessories ==
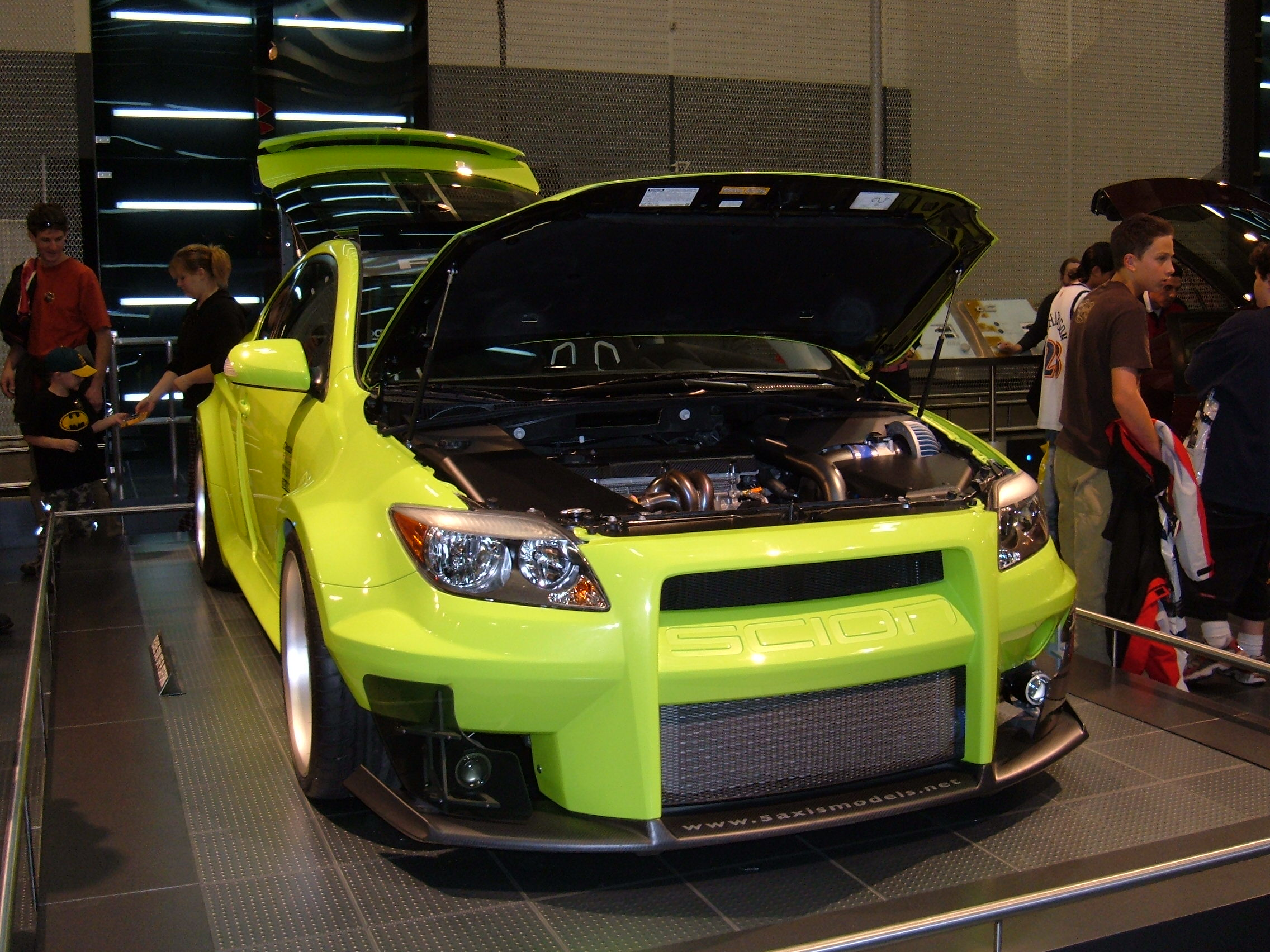
Aftermarket customized Scion tC

Scion offered about 150 different accessories; other after-market companies through the Optōmize Scion program offer to add other accessories, as well. For example, one can add a subwoofer as well as different types of decals. The tC had offered an optional supercharger to increase power from 161 to 200 hp (120 to 150 kW), but this option was since discontinued in 2007 due to early failure of the bearings inside the centrifugal blower. All accessories are sold individually, and do not require special packages. However, some options, such as Ground Effects, do prevent other accessories (such as mud flaps) from being installed.

Companies that participated in the Optōmize Scion program include GReddy, OBX, RÄZO, a few car detailing companies, and others.

== Release series ==
Beginning in the second quarter of 2004 with the launch of the 2004 Scion xB RS 1.0 (Release Series 1.0), followed by the Scion xA RS 1.0, Scion decided to create limited edition vehicles pre-packaged with exclusive accessories in limited quantities. Limited Edition vehicles from a marketing standpoint were used to create a buzz for the brand name, with their exterior colors tending to be loud or bright hues (e.g. orange, yellow, red, blue, green). Because of the growing popularity of the Scion product line and the scarce production runs (most dealers only get 2-3 of each RS model), these limited edition vehicles quickly sold out. Pre-ordering is available at each dealership on a first-come, first-served basis. To the customer's benefit, Scion's "Pure Price" MSRP bounds dealerships against market-demand vehicle mark-up. Naturally, resale values of Release Series vehicles command a premium because of their packaged options and scarcity.

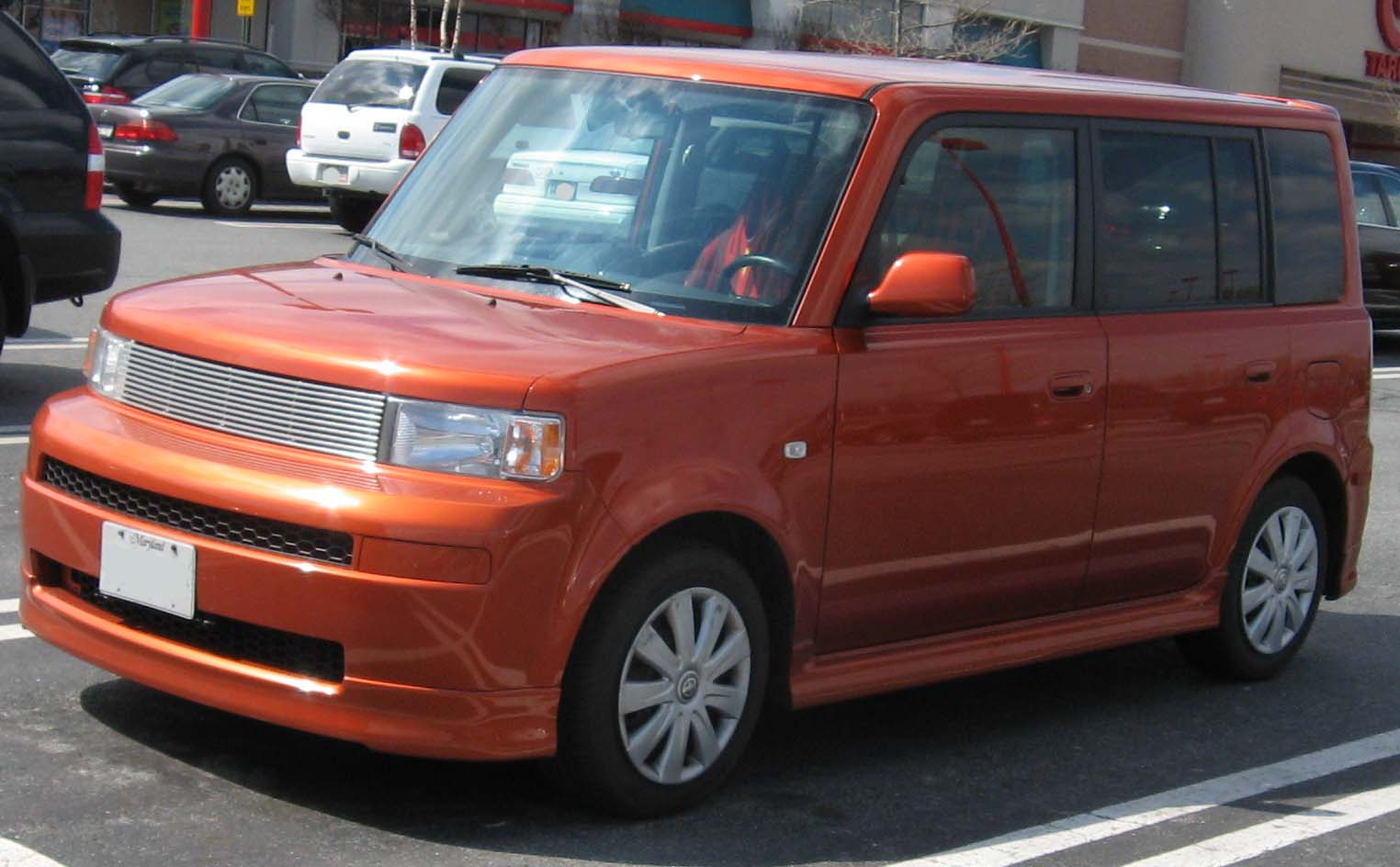
Scion xB RS 1.0

2004

- xB RS 1.0 only available in Hot Lava Orange with 2100 units produced (504 units w/5spd, 1596 units w/automatic)
- xA RS 1.0 only available in Absolutely Red with 1550 units produced

2005

- xB RS 2.0 only available in Solar Yellow with 2500 units produced
- xA RS 2.0 only available in Spectra Blue Mica with 1700 units produced
- tC RS 1.0 only available in Absolutely Red with 2500 units produced

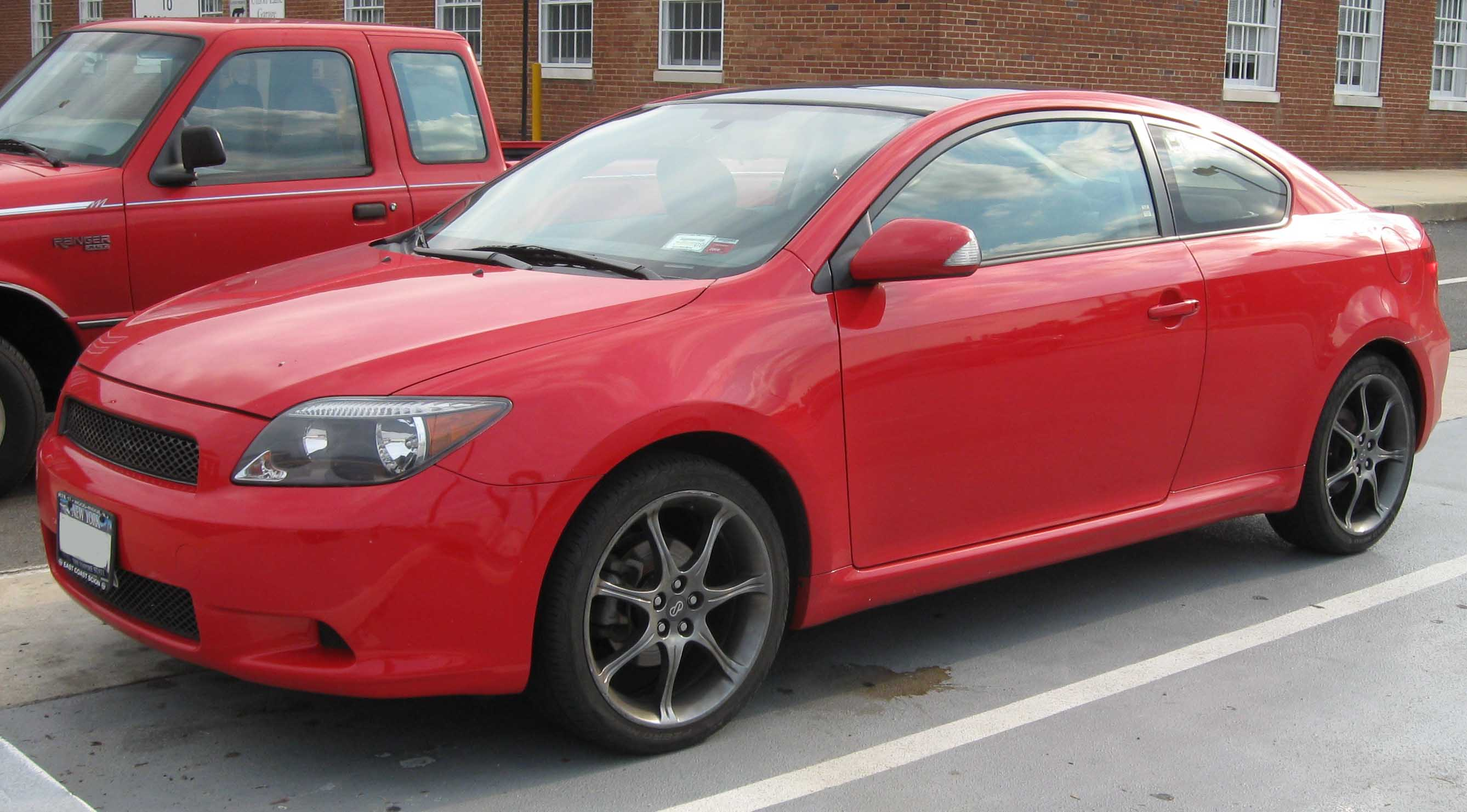
Scion tC RS 1.0

2006

- xB RS 3.0 only available in Envy Green with 2200 units produced
- xA RS 3.0 only available in Stingray Metallic light blue with 2500 units produced
- tC RS 2.0 only available in Blue Blitz Mica with 2600 units produced
- xB RS 4.0 only available in Maziora Torched Penny (polarized goldish brown) with 2500 units produced

2007

- tC RS 3.0 only available in Blizzard White with 2500 units produced

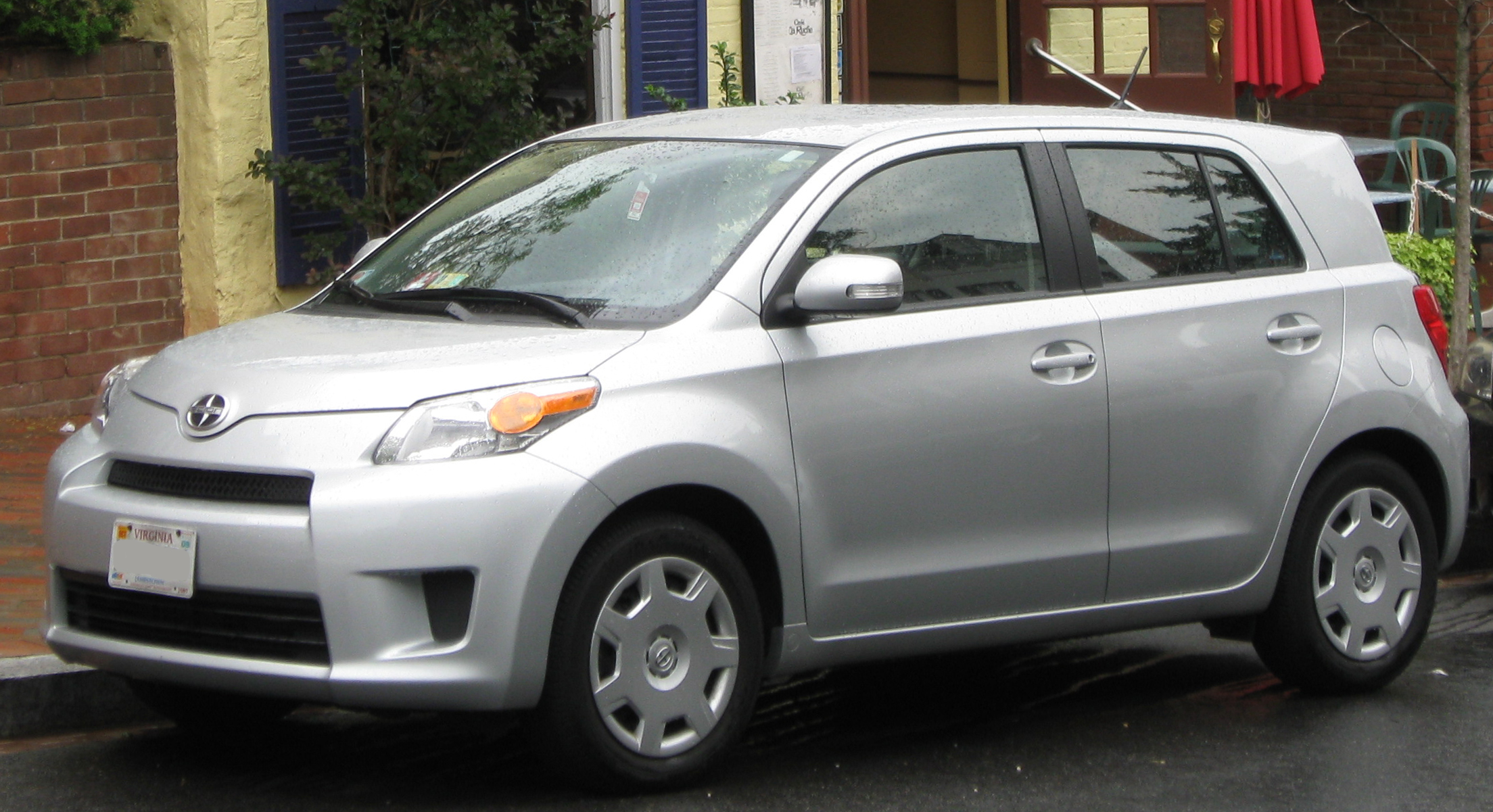
Scion xD

2008

- xB RS 5.0 only available in Gold Rush Mica with 2500 units produced
- tC RS 4.0 only available in Galactic Gray Mica with 2300 units produced
- xD RS 1.0 only available in Hot Lava Orange with 2000 units produced

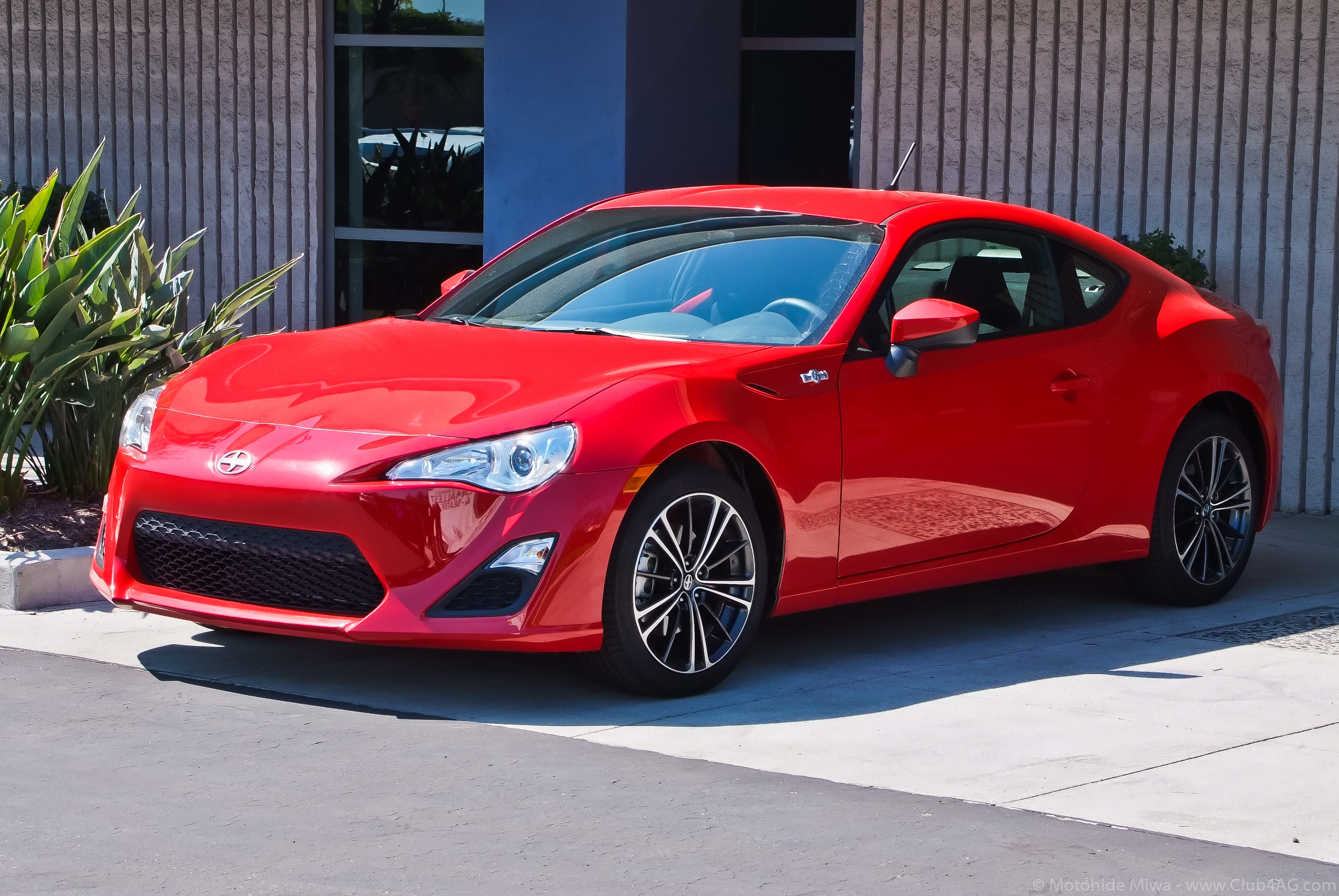
Scion FR-S

2009

- xB RS 6.0 only available in Absolutely Red with 2500 units produced
- tC RS 5.0 only available in Gloss Black with 2000 units produced
- xD RS 2.0 only available in Wasabi Green with 2000 units produced

2010

- xB RS 7.0 only available in Murasaki Purple with 2000 units produced
- tC RS 6.0 only available in Speedway Blue with 1100 units produced

2011

- xB RS 8.0 only available in Voodoo Blue with 2200 units produced
- xD RS 3.0 only available in xPRESSO with 1500 units produced

2012

- xB RS 9.0 only available in Hot Lava with 1500 units produced
- xD RS 4.0 only available in Blizzard Pearl with 800 units produced
- tC RS 7.0 only available in High Voltage Yellow with 2200 units produced

2013

- tC RS 8.0 Only available in Absolutely Red with 2000 units produced

2014

- FR-S RS 1.0 Only available in Yuzu Yellow with 1500 units produced
- xB RS 10.0 Only available in Electric Quartz with 1500 units produced

2015

- tC RS 9.0 Only available in Two-Tone Black/Orange color with 2000 units produced.

2016

- FR-S RS 2.0 Only available in a bright smoked color called "Lunar Storm" with cloth and brown leather seat sidings, with the steering wheel having half of brown and half of black with it having white stitching, as well as the interior panels having brown leather, and the interior having brown stitching with 1000 units produced. The badge is located in the passenger side airbag in cloth stitching.

== Target market ==
In 2007, the median age of a Toyota consumer was 54 years old. Comparatively, Scion's average buyer age at that time was lowest in the industry, at 39.

Initially, Scion's first two cars (the xA and xB), while unusual for American roads, were well received among consumers not interested in standard entry-level vehicles. The tC was also well received with brisk sales.

The marque's best-selling year was 2006, with 173,000 vehicles sold. Sales dropped in the ensuing years, to 57,961 vehicles in 2009. By 2010, the tC was the mainstay of the brand, accounting for over 40% of all Scions sold since the brand was established. However, some sales of the second-generation tC were cannibalized by the similar FR-S. In the U.S., sales of the xB declined after the introduction of the second generation, from a peak of over 60,000 to 17,017 in 2011; sales of the xD fell to 9,573 in 2011 from 32,603 in 2006.

By the time it was discontinued, over a million Scion-branded cars were sold. Over 70% were sold to people new to Toyota and just over 50% of the cars sold were to people under the age of 35; tC buyers had an average age of 29, the lowest in the industry.

== Advertising ==
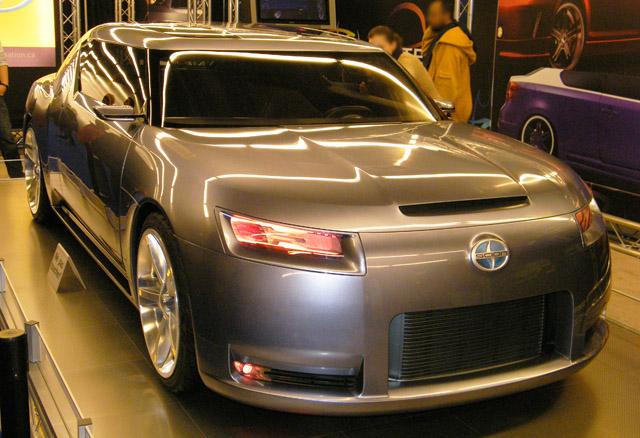
Scion Fuse concept

To advertise Scion, Toyota began a promotional campaign using a form of guerrilla marketing, using posters and ads in movie theaters and TV to direct consumers to its various "want2bsquare" web sites. Scion's marketing endeavors extended to sponsorships, such as that of VBS.tv's show, Thumbs Up!, which featured David Choe hitchhiking across the United States. Scion sponsored two commercials featuring Concours race car driver Matt Verbin during the Castle Hill Concours d'Elegance, showing him racing a custom painted yellow and orange xB on Cambridge streets. Scion also teamed with Gaia Online, providing the xB, xD, and tC as a choice for user cars, as well as other things across the site.

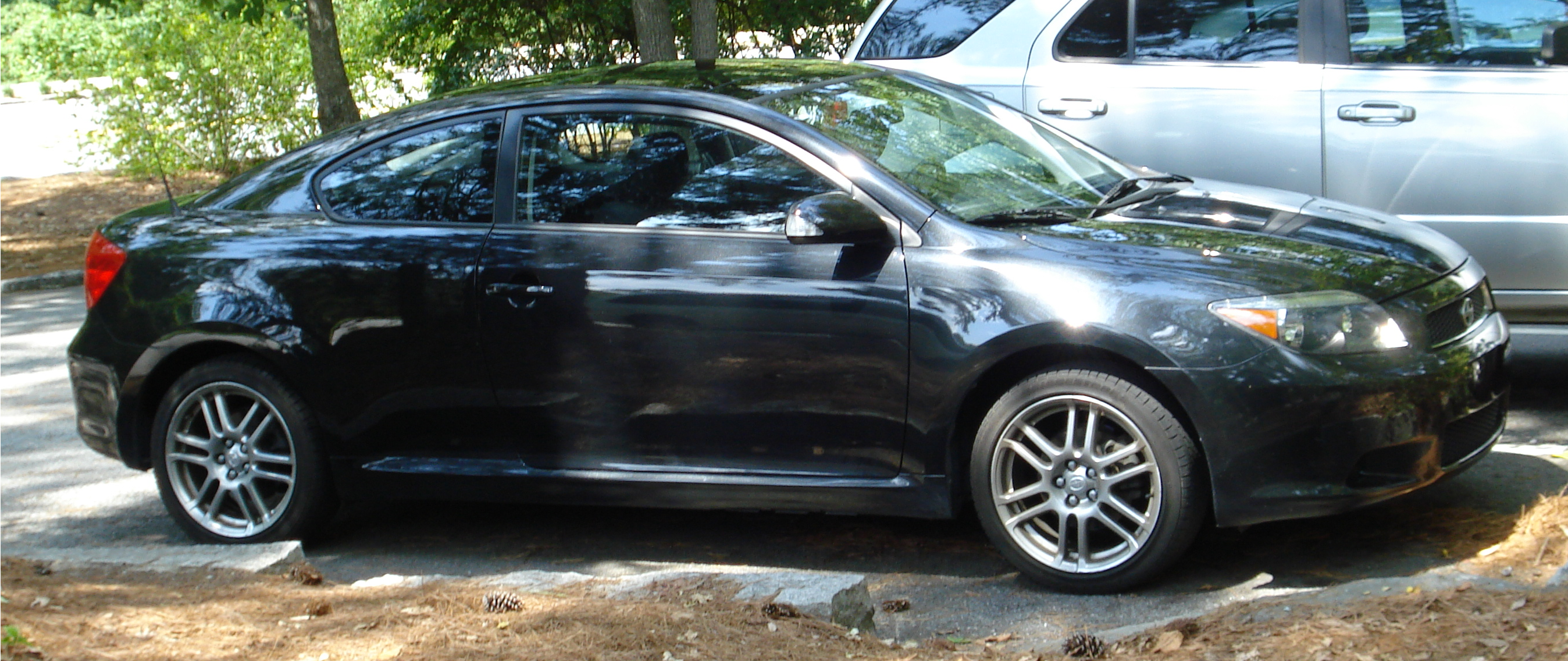
2006 Scion tC

Scion also used smaller, regional viral campaigns to reach niche demographics. Online campaigns such as Scion xPressionism allowed a user to modify and design their own Scion with graphics, decals, and aftermarket car parts. Online advertising, much of it quirky and offbeat, was part of Scion's marketing mix for both these campaigns and for the launch of new models. Shows like Slick's Picks went around the country interviewing artists, stores, and events and put short videos on the site. Scion Radio 17 was an internet-radio initiative that features 17 non-mainstream channels, ranging from rock and hip hop to electro and soul. Scion AV served as the brand's lifestyle marketing initiative, funding projects in music, art, and film.

In August 2008, Scion released the "United by Individuality" ad campaign, featuring over 300 Scion owners' vehicles in various magazine articles, commercials, and billboards. The latest commercial video showed a convoy of Scions parading through the desert in Boulder City, Nevada. These videos and ads could be seen on Scion's website.

== Sales ==
| Model | 2003 | 2004 | 2005 | 2006 | 2007 | 2008 | 2009 | 2010 | 2011 | 2012 | 2013 | 2014 | 2015 | 2016 | Total |
|---|---|---|---|---|---|---|---|---|---|---|---|---|---|---|---|
| FR-S | | | | | | | | | 0 | 11,417 | 18,327 | 14,062 | 10,507 | | 54,313 |
| iQ | | | | | | | | 0 | 248 | 8,879 | 4,046 | 2,040 | 482 | | 15,695 |
| tC | | 28,062 | 74,415 | 79,125 | 63,852 | 40,980 | 17,998 | 15,204 | 22,433 | 22,666 | 19,094 | 17,947 | 16,459 | 9,336 | 427,571 |
| xB | 6,936 | 47,013 | 54,037 | 61,306 | 45,834 | 45,220 | 25,461 | 20,364 | 17,017 | 19,789 | 17,849 | 16,583 | 15,223 | | 392,632 |
| xD | | | | | 10,948 | 27,665 | 14,499 | 10,110 | 9,573 | 10,756 | 9,005 | 7,377 | 794 | | 100,727 |
| xA | 3,962 | 24,184 | 28,033 | 32,603 | 9,547 | 39 | 3 | | | | | | | | 98,371 |
| iA | | | | | | | | | | | | | 7,605 | | 7,605 |
| iM | | | | | | | | | | | | | 5,097 | | 5,097 |
| Total | 10,898 | 99,259 | 156,485 | 173,034 | 130,181 | 113,904 | 57,961 | 45,678 | 49,271 | 73,507 | 68,321 | 58,009 | 56,167 | | 1,092,675 |

== See also ==
- eBox (a conversion of a Scion xB into BEV)
