= Scion tC =

Japanese compact coupe

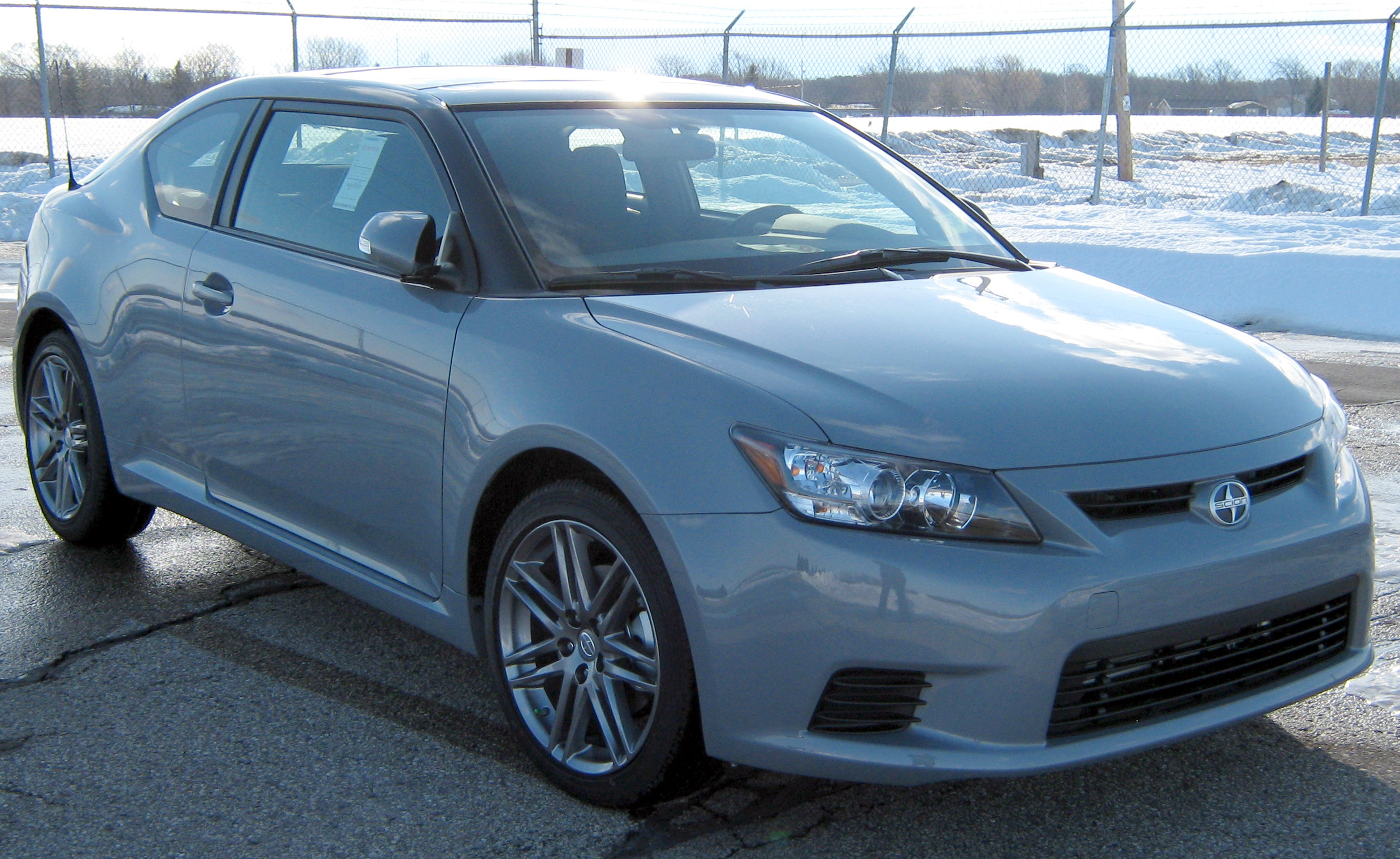
- 2011 Scion tC

Overview
- Manufacturer: Toyota
- Production: 2004–2016
- Model years: 2005–2016
- Assembly: Japan: Toyota, Aichi (Tsutsumi plant)

Body and chassis
- Class: Compact car
- Body style: 3-door hatchback coupe (liftback)
- Layout: Front-engine, front-wheel-drive

The Scion tC is a compact car manufactured by Toyota under its Scion brand from 2004 to 2016 over two generations: ANT10 (2004–2010) and AGT20 (2011–2016). Both generations were built in Japan. The tC was introduced first in the United States for the 2005 model year and then, beginning with the second generation in the 2011 model year, in Canada as well. The tC was Scion's best-selling model, constituting almost 40% of total Scion sales.

The name tC stands for "touring coupe." Beginning in 2011, the tC was sold as the Toyota Zelas in the Middle East, China and South America, a name derived from "zelante", Italian for "passionate" or "zealous."

== First generation (AT10; 2004) ==
First generation
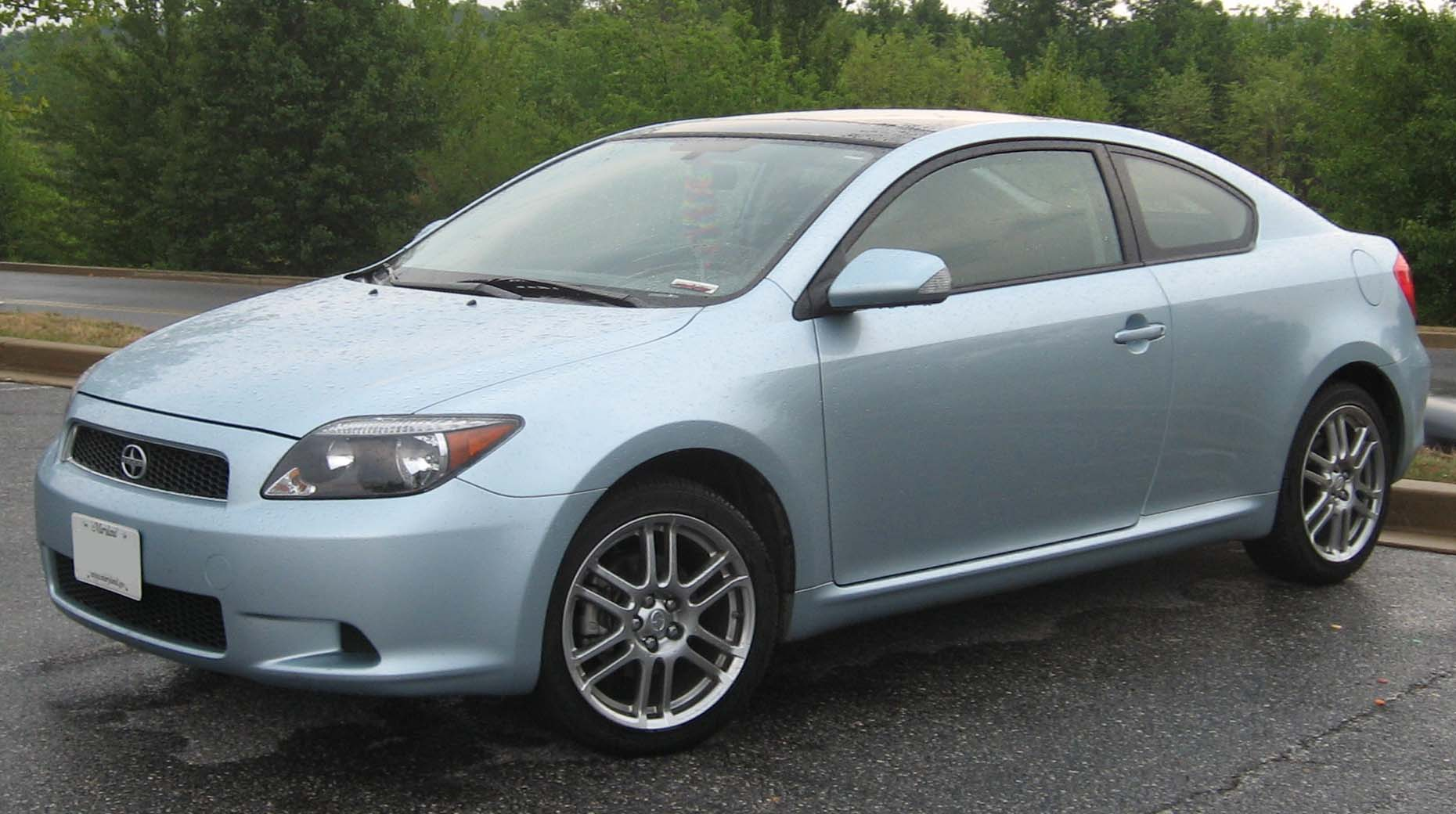

Overview
- Model code: AT10
- Production: 2004–2010
- Model years: 2005–2010
- Designer: Shunsaku Kodama and So Tamiya

Body and chassis
- Platform: Toyota MC platform
- Related: Toyota Avensis (T250)

Powertrain
- Engine: 2.4 L 2AZ-FE I4
- Transmission: 5-speed E350 manual 4-speed U241E automatic

Dimensions
- Wheelbase: 2,700 mm (106.3 in)
- Length: 4,420 mm (174.0 in)
- Width: 1,755 mm (69.1 in)
- Height: 1,415 mm (55.7 in)
- Curb weight: 1,318 kg (2,905 lb) (manual); 1,350 kg (2,970 lb) (automatic)

Toyota debuted the production tC at the January 2004 North American International Auto Show with sales beginning in May 2004 as a 2005 model year. The tC was a spiritual successor to the Celica intended to appeal to the Millennial market. To this end, Toyota included numerous standard features, and optional features were easy to add. Standard equipment included power windows, cruise control, air conditioning, keyless entry, mirror-mounted turn signal lights, four-wheel anti-lock disc brakes, a 160-watt Pioneer sound system with CD player, 17-inch alloy wheels, and a panoramic moonroof.

The tC shares its chassis with the Avensis and uses a MacPherson strut front and double wishbone rear suspension. It was offered at a low base MSRP (US$17,670 for the 2009 model with manual transmission) with the pure "monospec" pricing marketing style that Toyota adopted. This generation was not sold in Canada.

A bare-bones version of the tC known as the Spec Package was offered without many of the standard accessories. The Spec Package replaced the 17-inch (430 mm) alloy wheels with 16-inch (410 mm) steel wheels and seven spoke wheel covers, and had simplified interior and exterior equipment, including a fixed rather than powered glass roof, deletion of cruise control and steering wheel audio controls, and urethane steering wheel finish instead of wrapped leather. Meant to serve as a blank slate to the tuner market, the Spec Package was offered in only four colors: Super White, Flint Mica, Black Sand Pearl and Classic Silver Metallic. MSRP was $1,400 less than the standard model. The Spec Package was discontinued for the 2009 model year.

The tC received a minor refresh in 2007 for the 2008 model year that included a revised grille and new head and taillights.

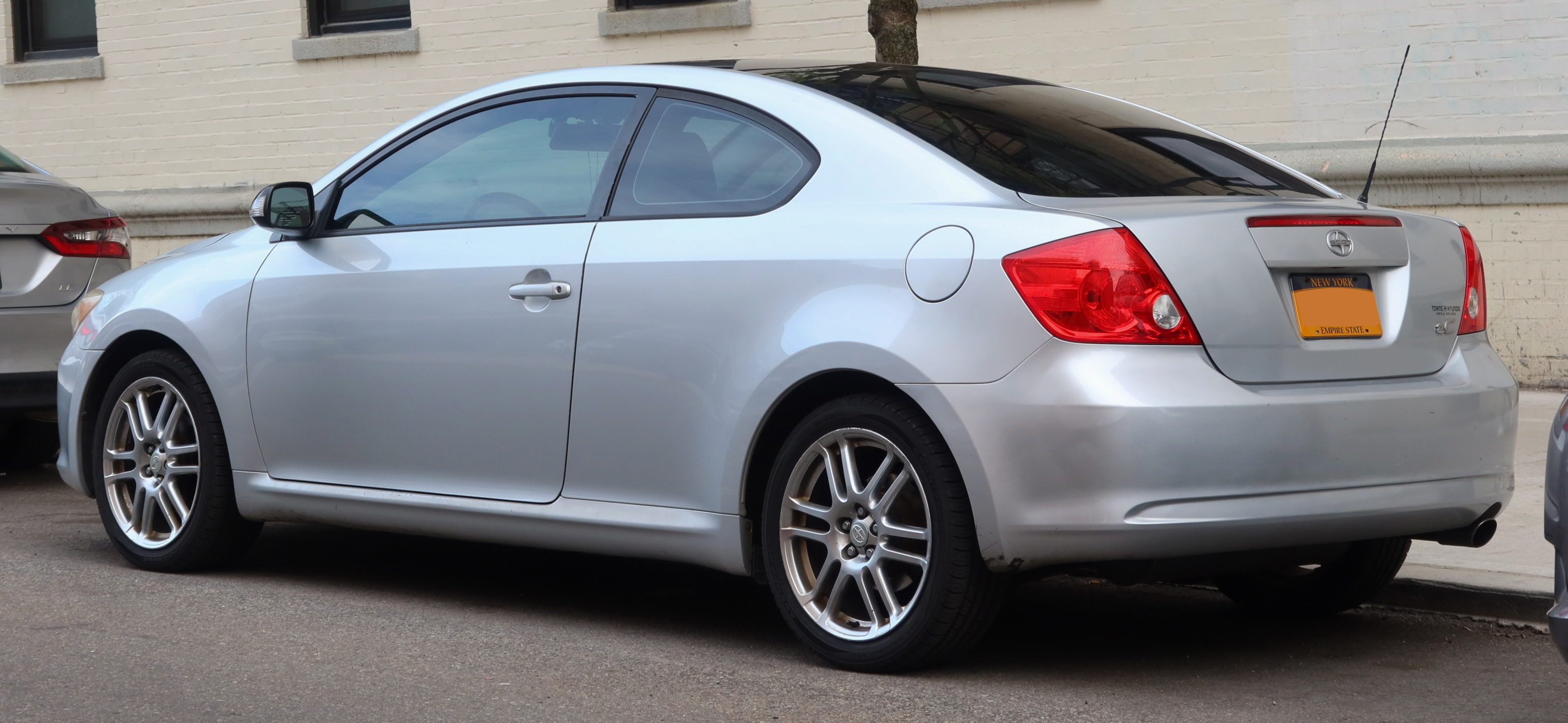
2005 Scion tC

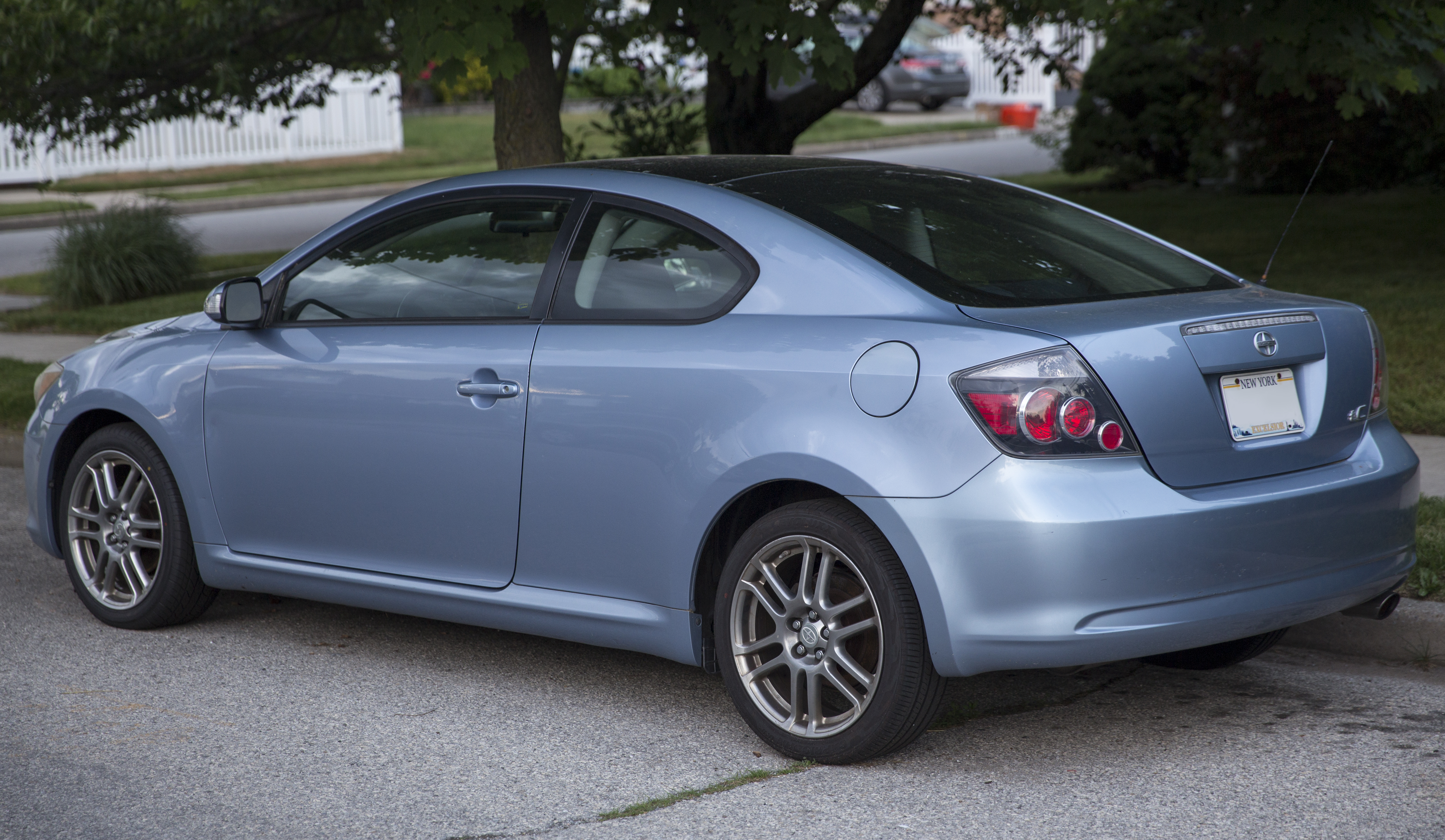
2010 Scion tC (facelift)

Scion tC interior

The model was Scion's best seller, reaching over 79,125 units sold in 2006, but the car's sales quickly dwindled by 2010, only moving 15,204 units. A 2nd generation was released for the 2011 model year.

Car and Driver praised the 2005 tC for its list of accessories but criticized its low headroom in the backseat and limited cargo room.

=== Specifications ===
- Engine: 2.4 L dual overhead cam (DOHC) 16-valve 4-cylinder with VVT-i, compression ratio of 9.6:1 for the 2005/06 models and 9.8:1 for 2007–2010.
- Displacement: 2362 cc
- Power: 161 hp (120 kW) at 6000 rpm (2007MY+) / 160 hp (119 kW) at 5700 rpm (2005-06MY)
- Torque: 162 lb⋅ft (220 N⋅m) at 4000 rpm (2007MY+) / 163 lb⋅ft (221 N⋅m) at 4000 rpm (2005-06MY)
- 200 hp (149 kW) / 185 lb⋅ft (251 N⋅m) with TRD supercharger
- Transmission: Standard 5-speed manual transmission or optional 4-speed electronically controlled automatic transmission (2008-2010 automatic transmissions are labeled as "4 speed sequential" transmission in the Scion brochure)
- Curb weight: 2,970 lb (1,347 kg) (automatic); 2,905 lb (1,318 kg) (manual)
- Fuel tank: 14.5 US gal (55 L; 12 imp gal)
- EPA ratings for manual transmission: 20 mpg_{‑US} (12 L/100 km; 24 mpg_{‑imp}) city / 27 mpg_{‑US} (8.7 L/100 km; 32 mpg_{‑imp}) hwy (2007MY+); 19 mpg_{‑US} (12 L/100 km; 23 mpg_{‑imp}) city / 27 mpg_{‑US} (8.7 L/100 km; 32 mpg_{‑imp}) hwy (2005/06)
- EPA ratings for automatic transmission: 21 mpg_{‑US} (11 L/100 km; 25 mpg_{‑imp}) city / 29 mpg_{‑US} (8.1 L/100 km; 35 mpg_{‑imp}) hwy (2007MY+); 20 mpg_{‑US} (12 L/100 km; 24 mpg_{‑imp}) city / 27 mpg_{‑US} (8.7 L/100 km; 32 mpg_{‑imp}) hwy (2005/06)
- Performance
- 0-60 mph (97 km/h): 7.4 seconds
- 1/4 mile (~400 m): 15.6 seconds at 89.9 mph (144.7 km/h)
- 1/4 mile (~400 m): 14.2 seconds (with TRD supercharger)

=== Safety ===
NHTSA crash test ratings (2006)

- Frontal Crash Test - Driver:
- Frontal Crash Test - Passenger:
- Side Impact Rating -
- Side Impact Rating - Rear:
- Rollover Rating:

The Insurance Institute for Highway Safety (IIHS) gave the Scion tC an "Acceptable" overall score in both the frontal offset and side impact crash tests.

All Scion tCs come standard with 4-wheel disc brakes with anti-lock brakes. For 2008 models, front seat-mounted side torso airbags, front and rear side curtain airbags, and a driver's knee airbag became standard. Front passenger classification was also added, allowing dual stage control of airbag release dependent upon the weight of the passenger. Vehicle Stability Control was not originally offered until 2011 when Toyota began rolling out Electronic Stability Control (ESC) and Vehicle Stability Control (VSC) in all their vehicle brands, including Scion, sold in North America.

== Second generation (AT20; 2010) ==
Second generation
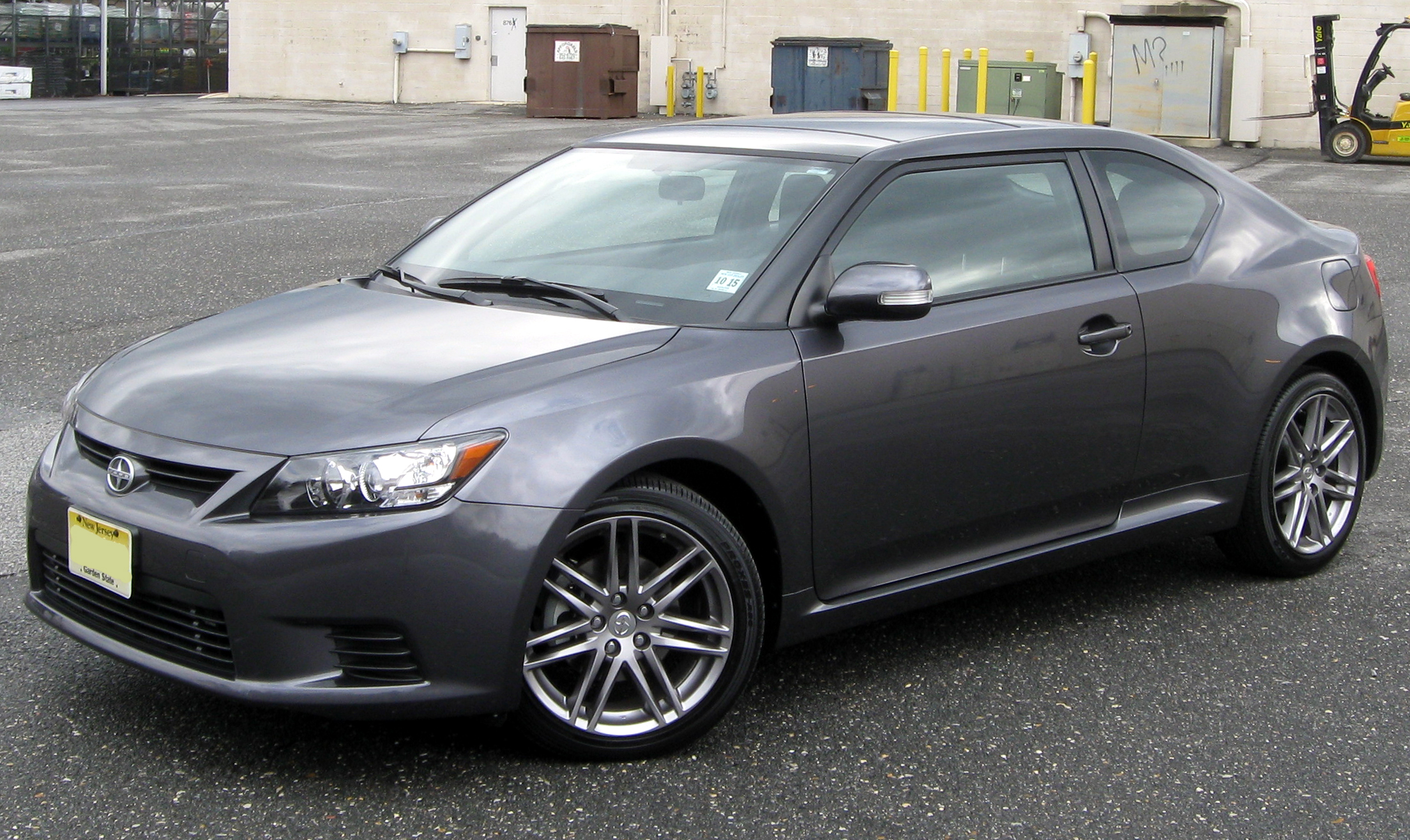
- Front view (pre-facelift)

Overview
- Model code: AT20
- Also called: Toyota Zelas (Central America, China, Middle East, Africa, South America)
- Production: 2010 – August 2016
- Model years: 2011–2016
- Designer: Bob Mochizuki

Body and chassis
- Platform: Toyota New MC platform
- Related: Toyota Avensis (T270)

Powertrain
- Engine: 2.5 L 2AR-FE I4
- Transmission: 6-speed EB60 manual 6-speed U760E automatic

Dimensions
- Wheelbase: 2,700 mm (106.3 in)
- Length: 4,420 mm (174.0 in)
- Width: 1,796 mm (70.7 in)
- Height: 1,415 mm (55.7 in)
- Curb weight: 1,402 kg (3,090 lb) (manual); 1,433 kg (3,160 lb) (automatic)

=== 2011–2013 ===
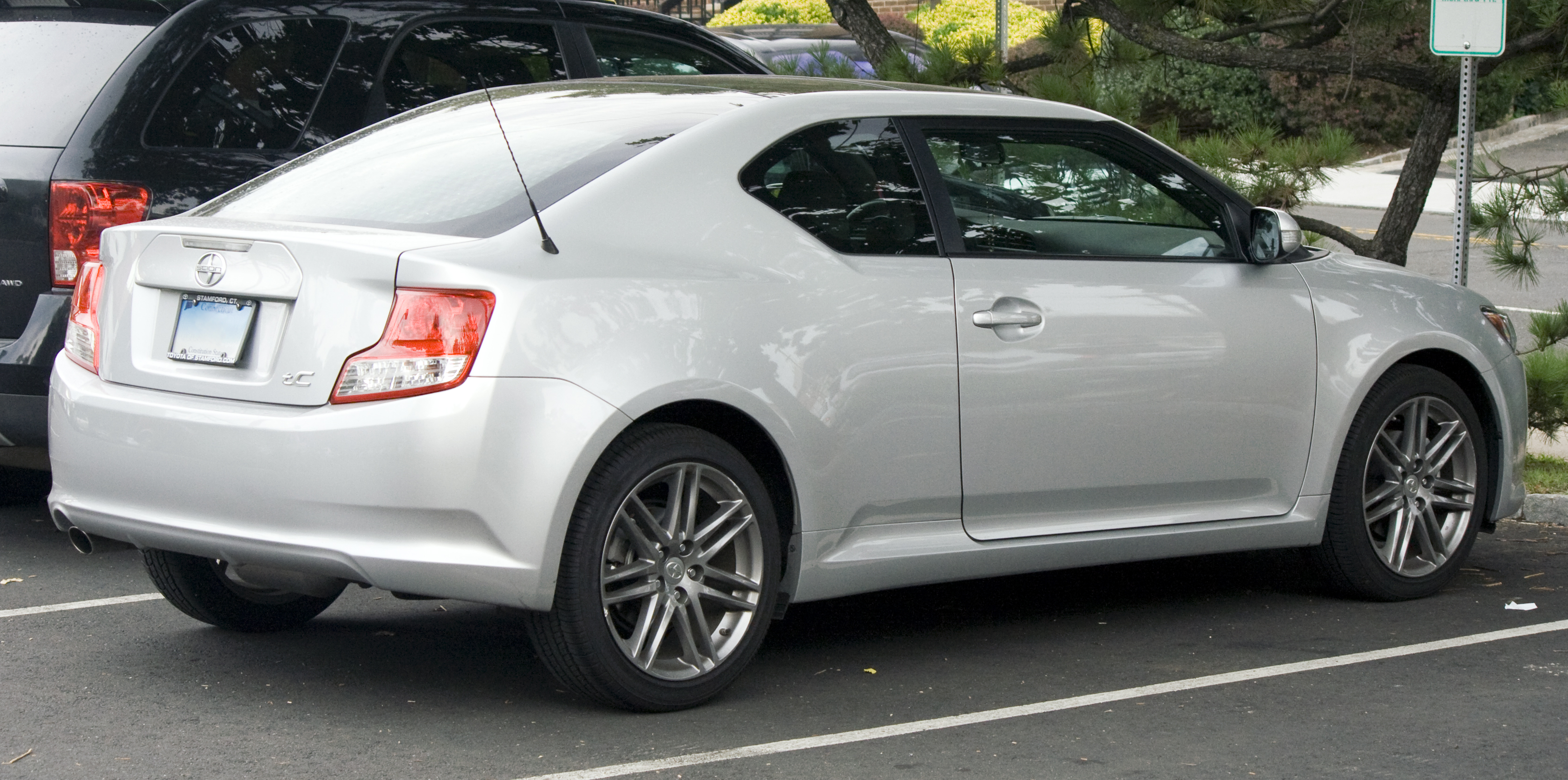
Rear view (pre-facelift)

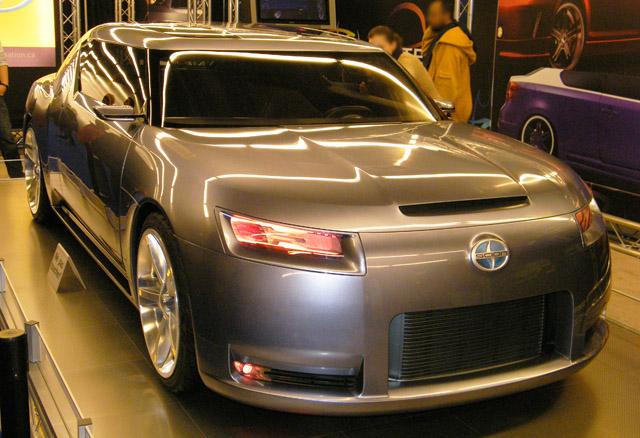
2006 Scion Fuse concept car

The replacement model debuted at the April 2010 New York International Auto Show, and appeared in U.S. dealerships in October 2010. It received a performance bump; with the new engine being carried over from the Toyota Camry being a 2.5 liter I4 2AR-FE engine producing 180 hp (130 kW) and 174 lb⋅ft (236 N⋅m). Like the first generation, the chassis remained a variant of the Toyota Avensis, the model using the third generation chassis. Visually, the second generation is a toned-down variant of the 2006 Scion Fuse concept, featuring a similar rear quarter-panel window line to the concept but with xB-styled blacked-out A-pillars. The headlights, taillights and grille received a makeover to make the car seem more muscular and angular. It continued to receive very high safety marks, an all-glass roof, roomy interior, and a hatchback design. Other changes included a wider track, standard 18-inch (460 mm) wheels, larger brake discs, a more powerful engine, a six-speed transmission, and a performance-tuned electric power steering system. The Scion tC now comes standard with Vehicle Stability Control. A TRD supercharger was originally offered for the car, as well as a special body kit by FiveAxis, but both have since been discontinued. The tC remained popular in the tuner market, with many aftermarket performance upgrades still being available.

==== Toyota Zelas ====
Toyota Zelas

At the 2010 Abu Dhabi Motor Show, the Scion tC was introduced under the Toyota Zelas nameplate. It later went on sale in the Middle East, with an aggressive body kit not featured on the Scion tC.

=== 2014–2016 ===
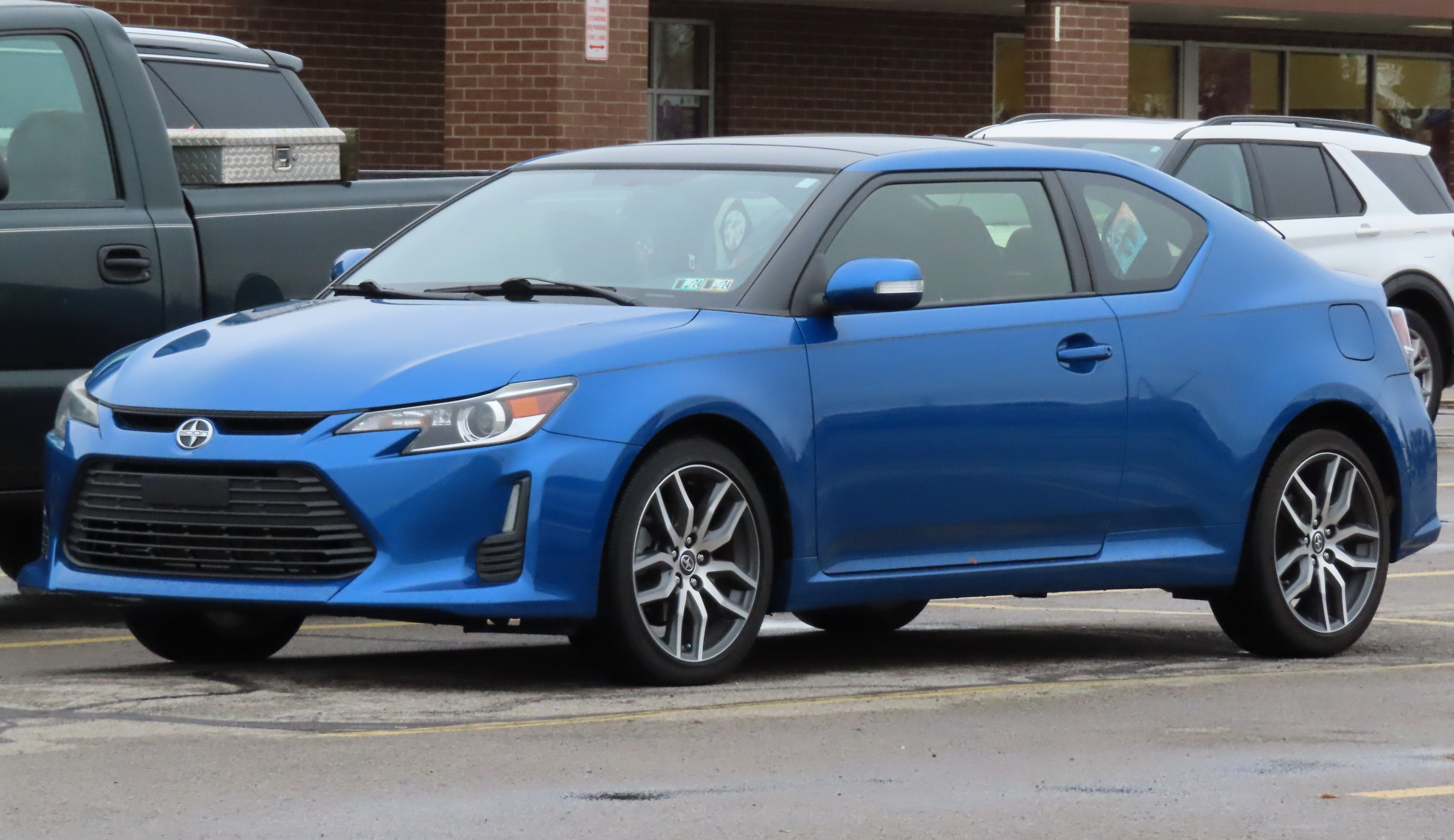

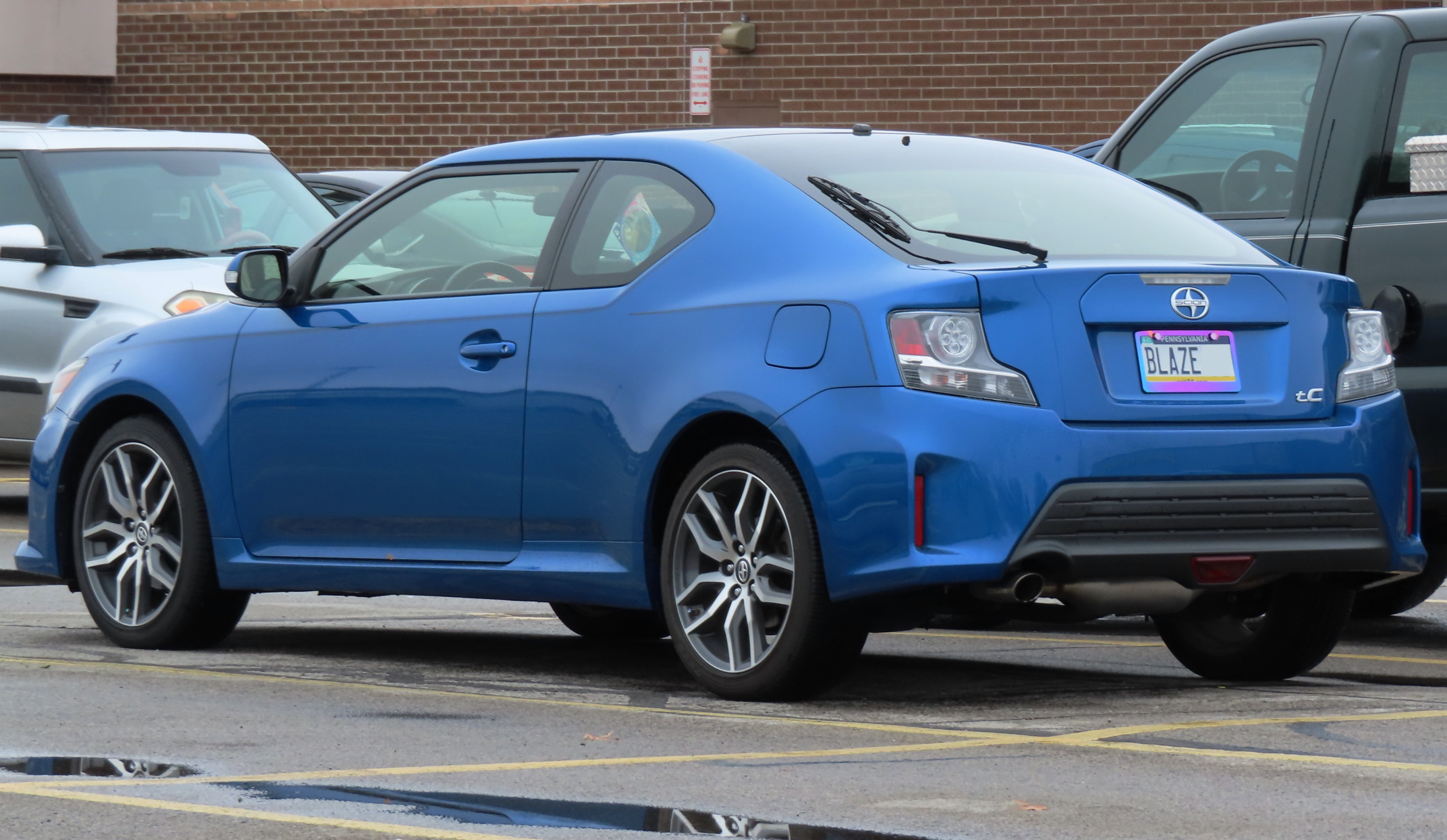
Facelift

Initial sales of the second generation tC fell short of expectations, and to coincide with the launch of the Scion FR-S, the tC received a facelift for the 2014 model year. Inspired by the design of the FR-S, the 2014 tC received updated headlamps, grille, LED taillights, 18-inch alloy rims, body kit, a sport-tuned suspension, reworked faster shifting transmission, sport-tuned shocks, and a new touch screen audio system standard. For the first model year, Scion offered a Series 10 anniversary edition of the ten-year anniversary of the brand, limited to 3500 units. It included a new silver color, silver seat belts, a solar-powered illuminated shift knob, an LED Scion locator badge that lights up when the car is unlocked and a sequentially numbered interior badge. For the 2016 model year, the tC received some minor changes, such as a standard rear windshield wiper, new silver interior door handles, center console tray cover, and a leather-wrapped shift knob, the latter of which was formerly an optional upgrade.

The tC ended production in August 2016 after a final release edition as part of the phasing out of Scion brand. At 29, the tC sports coupe had the lowest-average age buyer in the industry according to Toyota.

==== Specifications ====
Model	Engine	Power@rpm	Torque@rpm	Transmission	0-60 mph (0-97 km/h)	1/4 mile	EPA fuel economy ratings	Weight	Fuel tank	Tire size
Scion tC	2.5 L 2AR-FE I4 (gasoline)	180 hp (134 kW) @ 6000 rpm	173 lb⋅ft (235 N⋅m) @ 4100 rpm	6-speed manual transmission	6.5s	15.1s @ 92.4 mph	23 mpg_{‑US} (10 L/100 km; 28 mpg_{‑imp}) city / 31 mpg_{‑US} (7.6 L/100 km; 37 mpg_{‑imp}) hwy	3,060 lb (1,388 kg) -3,093 lb (1,403 kg)	14.5 US gal (55 L; 12 imp gal)	225/45R18
Scion tC	2.5 L 2AR-FE I4 (gasoline)	180 hp (134 kW) @ 6000 rpm	173 lb⋅ft (235 N⋅m) @ 4100 rpm	6-speed automatic transmission with manual shift mode	7.4s	15.8s @ 88 mph	23 mpg_{‑US} (10 L/100 km; 28 mpg_{‑imp}) city / 31 mpg_{‑US} (7.6 L/100 km; 37 mpg_{‑imp}) hwy	3,102 lb (1,407 kg) - 3,160 lb (1,433 kg)	14.5 US gal (55 L; 12 imp gal)	225/45R18
Toyota Zelas	2.5 L 2AR-FE I4 (gasoline)	178 hp (133 kW) @ 6000 rpm	172 lb⋅ft (233 N⋅m) @ 4100 rpm	6-speed automatic transmission with manual shift mode	7.4s	15.8s @ 88 mph	23 mpg_{‑US} (10 L/100 km; 28 mpg_{‑imp}) city / 31 mpg_{‑US} (7.6 L/100 km; 37 mpg_{‑imp}) hwy	3,086 lb (1,400 kg) -3,142 lb (1,425 kg)	14.5 US gal (55 L; 12 imp gal)	215/50R17

==== Safety ====
NHTSA crash test ratings (2011)

- Frontal Impact - Driver:
- Frontal Impact - Passenger:
- Side Impact - Driver:
- Side Impact - Rear Passenger:
- Side Pole - Driver:
- Rollover Rating -

IIHS scores
Moderate overlap frontal offset	Good
Small overlap frontal offset	Acceptable
Side impact	Good
Roof strength	Good

== Toyota Racing Development (TRD) ==
Similar to many other models of Toyota/Lexus/Scion, there are many upgrades available through the in house tuning shop Toyota Racing Development (TRD). TRD used to produce performance parts such as lowering springs and racing struts, full coil-over suspension systems, performance brake kits, rear sway bars, front strut tower bars, limited-slip differentials, upgraded clutches, axle-back exhausts and cold-air intakes for the Scion tC. Other cosmetic accessories such as TRD branded valve covers and oil caps were also offered.

TRD also offered a supercharger, which is a rebadged Vortech supercharger, that is capable of putting out 20 psi (1.4 bar), although when installed by a dealership and under warranty it is set at 6 psi (0.4 bar). Starting in 2008, Scion began making the supercharger with tamper-proof pulleys. As of mid-2009, TRD discontinued production of superchargers for the Scion tC.

In 2016, TRD discontinued production of all parts for the Scion tC.

== Release Series line ==
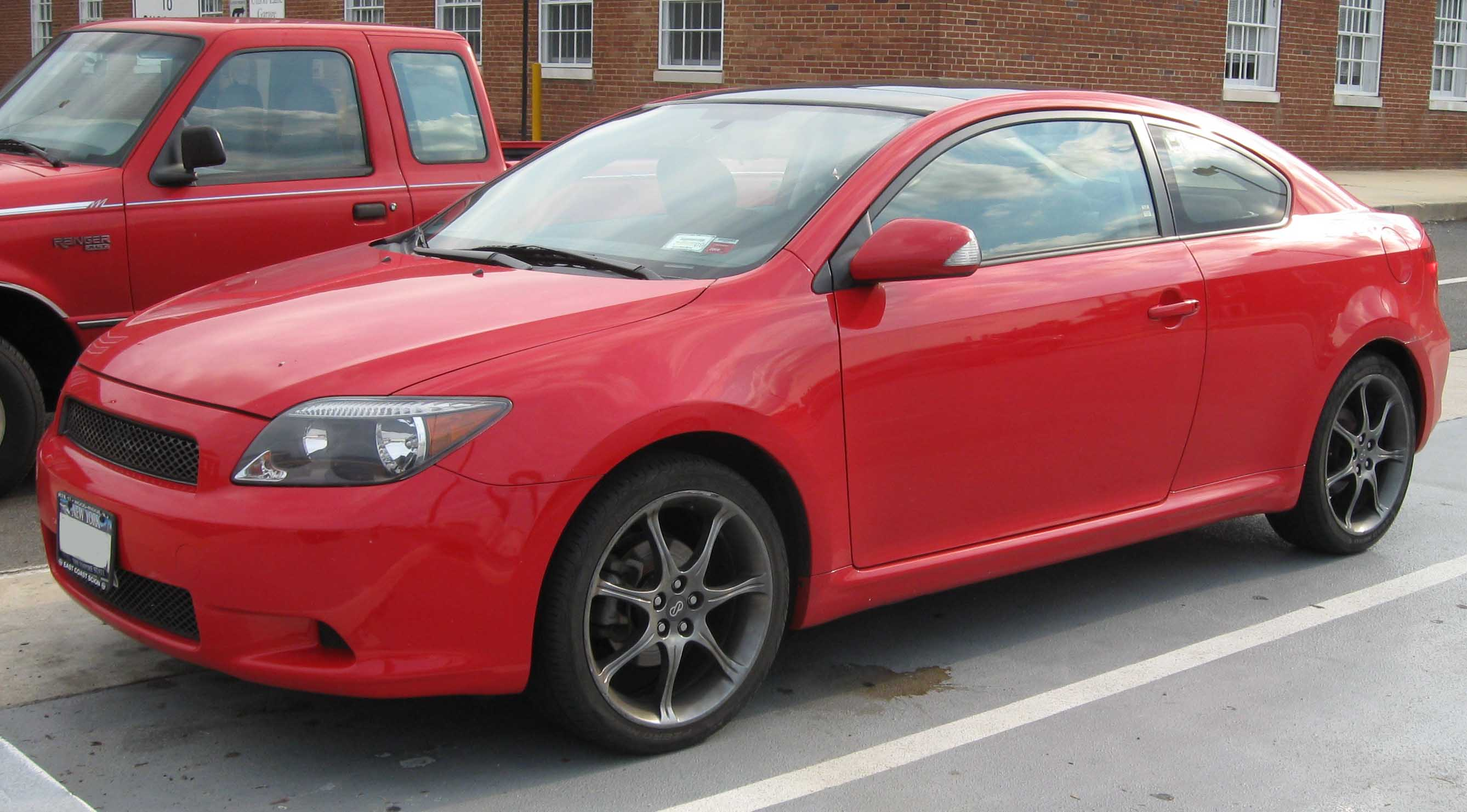
2005 Scion tC RS 1.0

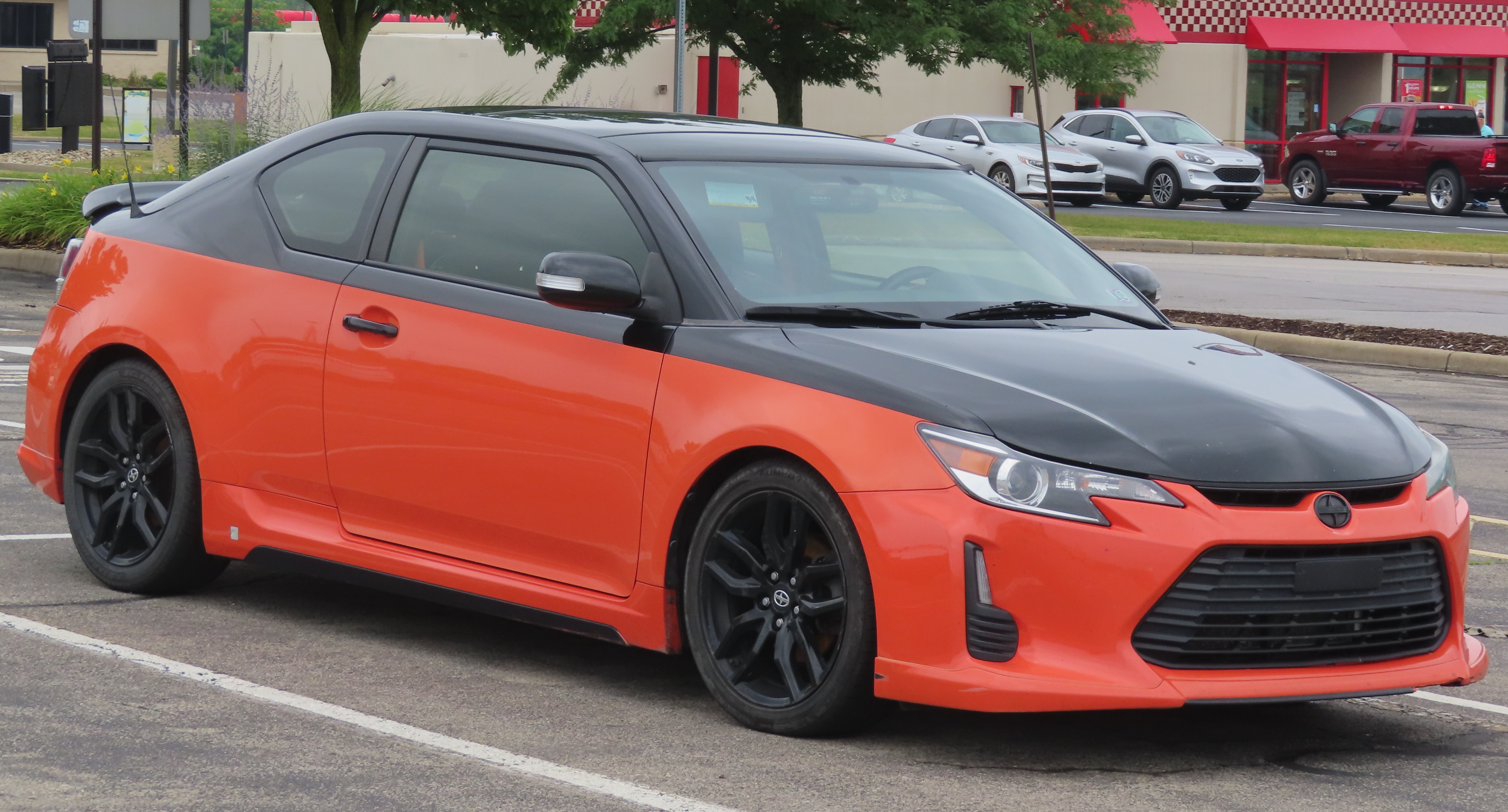
2015 Scion tC RS 9.0

Scion used a simplified "pure price" sales model that eschewed traditional factory options in favor of fixed base-vehicle pricing and buyer customization via dealer-installed accessories; hence, the tC was offered in a single standard trim, with exterior colors and the choice of transmission typically being the only factory options. However, some limited-production special editions with added factory equipment and exclusive colors were offered. Beginning in late spring 2004, Scion launched the Release Series (RS) line, limited quantities of their current vehicles pre-packaged with individual numbered badging, exclusive accessories, and other special features. Their exterior colors were bright hues (i.e. orange, yellow, red, blue, green).

Please note that not all cosmetics, features, and options are not listed in this page.

2005

- tC RS 1.0 only available in Absolutely Red with 2,500 units produced

2006

- tC RS 2.0 only available in Blue Blitz Mica with 2,600 units produced

2007

- tC RS 3.0 only available in Blizzard Pearl with 2,500 units produced

2008

- tC RS 4.0 only available in Galactic Gray Mica with 2,300 units produced

2009

- tC RS 5.0 only available in Gloss Black with 2,000 units produced

2010

- tC RS 6.0 only available in Speedway Blue with 1,100 units produced

2012

- tC RS 7.0 only available in High Voltage Yellow with 2,200 units produced

2013

- tC RS 8.0 only available in Absolutely Red with 2,000 units produced

2014

- tC 10th Anniversary Series only available in Silver Ignition with 3,500 units produced

2015

- tC RS 9.0 only available in Two Tone Magma Orange and Gloss Black with 2,000 units produced

2016

- tC RS 10.0 only available in Barcelona Red with 1,200 units produced

== Sales ==
The tC immediately became Scion's most popular model, representing almost half of the brand's sales in its peak years from 2005 to 2007, before being eclipsed by the redesigned xB in 2008. On release of the second-generation model, Scion hoped to sell 40,000–60,000 units annually once the economy recovered, but actual sales fell well short of this figure; analysts believe that sales were cannibalized by the similar FR-S. Despite the decline, the tC reclaimed and held its sales lead in the Scion lineup in 2011; it was ultimately the all-time best-selling Scion, constituting almost 40% of total Scion sales from 2004 through 2015, the brand's last full year before being amalgamated into Toyota.

Calendar Year	US Sales
2004	28,062
2005	74,415
2006	79,125
2007	63,852
2008	40,980
2009	17,998
2010	15,204
2011	22,433
2012	22,666
2013	19,094
2014	17,947
2015	16,459
2016	9,336

== Motorsport ==
- With the demise of the Toyota Celica, the Scion tC was used for the Toyota Pro/Celebrity Race held during the Long Beach Grand Prix from 2006 to 2012, when it was replaced with the FR-S.
- There are several tCs in drag racing. Kenny Tran Jotech Motorsports, Leslie Armendariz Horizon Motorsports, Christian Rado World Racing, and Gary White (formerly Brad Personett)Titan Motorsports. Kenny Tran has been competing in the NHRA Sport Compact drag racing series hotrod class where he garnered the 2007 championship. Kenny cut his fastest run with 7.91 ET at 184 mph (296 km/h) during a NHRA race at Pomona Raceway. In 2007 and 2008, the Jotech Motorsports team won back-to-back Pro Import Class titles of the Battle Of The Imports drag series. Leslie Armendariz's All-Motor Scion tC pushed a record setting 9.34 at 143 mph (230 km/h). Christian Rado claimed 2nd place in the Pro FWD class of the 2008 BOTI nationals, he also later claimed a victory with the first FWD car to pass the seven second mark in a quarter mile with a blistering time of 6.97 seconds. Gary White won second place in the Extreme 10.5" class of the ADRL Battle of the Belts World Finals.
- A 2011 tC was entered for the Formula Drift season in 2011 and is driven by Fredric Aasbo for Team Need For Speed. The 2AR-FE engine, being 2.5 liters was bumped up to 2.7 liters for over 500 hp.
- For the 2008 Formula Drift year, RS*R converted a Scion tC to rear wheel drive. This was done by taking a Toyota Avensis chassis (which the Scion tC is based on, originally an AWD platform) and converted it into RWD. The car was powered by a tuned BEAMS 3S-GE engine. Ken Gushi previously competed with this vehicle. After talks with teammate Christian Rado, Ken Gushi switched back to the factory 2AZ-FE engine, for the 2010 Formula Drift season. Ken Gushi stated "Chris Rado, my Scion Team mate who runs his famous record tearing Scion tC uses the same base motor (of course for a different application) has proven this motor to withstand numbers up to 900hp, possibly even more." Ken Gushi's tC is now pushing 790 hp.
- For the 2009/10 Formula Drift seasons, Tanner Foust competed using a Rockstar, AEM and Toyo Tire sponsored Scion tC converted to RWD, built by Papadakis Racing. It was powered by a TRD (Toyota Racing Development) built V8 taken from a former TRD Busch Series NASCAR stocker.
- For the 2008 KONI Challenge season, Dan Gardner and Craig Stanton drove a Scion tC in the Street Tuner (ST) Class. This marked Scion's world-first professional start in road racing, and the team led the race for a period of time in a 50+ car field.
- For 2009, a Supercharged tC driven by team owner Dan Gardner was entered in the SCCA World Challenge Touring Car 2 (TC2) class. Scott Webb drove the car to victory, bringing Scion home their first-ever professional win.
- For the 2010 SCCA World Challenge season, Dan Gardner and Robert Stout drove a pair of supercharged Scion tCs in the Touring Car (TC) class. Robert Stout would win at the 2010 Toyota Grand Prix of Long Beach, giving Scion its first-ever TC class win.
- In 2010 DG-Spec won the manufacturer's championship in World Challenge for Scion. This marked the first time any Toyota brand had ever won the prestigious championship. No Toyota marque has won since.
- In 2011 Dan Gardner Spec won the WERC endurance series for the second time, capping off the performance with an entry into the 25 Hours of Thunderhill. The team led the race by as much as a whopping 28 laps before an engine failure brought the car into the pits. The team accomplished the impossible, doing a full motor-swap in 2 hours, and putting the car back on track with 25 minutes to go in the race, claiming the final step on the podium.
- In June 2012, Christian Rado used a Team Need for Speed AWD Scion tC at the Palm Beach International Raceway for a lap record of 1:20.810 minutes.
