= Redline Time Attack =

Redline Time Attack is a North American auto racing series, founded by Nikolas Malechikos and Chris Willard, that emerged with its first racing season in 2006. The West Coast Operations are still being held Today but the East Coast Operations were suspended in 2011 because it was no longer financially viable to continue.

The basic format of time-attack racing is that production based sports cars compete for the fastest single lap around a paved road course. The cars range from lightly modified to very heavily modified production cars. Cars are classed based on their drive type (FWD, RWD, or AWD) and level of modification. Time Attack is most often associated with Japanese autos, because the sport originated in Japan. However, all makes and models are allowed to compete in Redline Time Attack events.

The courses are typically popular paved road courses such as Buttonwillow, Laguna Seca, Sebring, or Autobahn. Since drivers compete against the clock, instead of wheel-to-wheel as in traditional road course racing, the potential risk to participants is minimized. It is common for participants to use their daily driven autos in competition in the entry classes. The higher classes include semi and fully professional racing teams who often have some level of sponsorship. In addition to the traditional Time Attack, Redline Time Attack also includes a Super Session which consists of a 5 lap sprint race with a traditional wheel-to-wheel format. Participation is limited to teams with a sufficiently fast qualifying lap and possessing a car with the required safety equipment.

== Classes ==
The three classes are described below, with each class subdivided by drive type; (FWD, RWD, or AWD).

=== Enthusiast ===
  - New for 2011. Enthusiast Class will not be part of the Redline Pro Time Attack Series beginning in 2011. **

=== Street Tire ===
The Street Tire Class is intended for vehicles that are "Street Legal" and use DOT approved Street Tires. Competitive cars in this class typically have in excess of 300 wheel-horsepower, with some of the fastest above 500 wheel-horsepower. The Street Tire Class is the most popular class based on participation.

Notable changes for 2011: "Pro" drivers are allowed, vehicles do not need to be currently registered with the DMV, mandatory safety requirements

=== Modified ===
The Modified Class allows extensive modification and does not require that the vehicle maintain a registration for street use. Cars are allowed the use of R-Compound track tires as well as much flexibility in the areas of suspension, aerodynamics, and body work. Professional drivers are allowed in this class, though many of the drivers are also the car owner. Competitive cars in this class typically have in excess of 400 wheel-horsepower, with the fastest above 600 wheel-horsepower.

=== Super Modified ===
Formerly the "Unlimited" class, the Super Modified class was renamed in 2010 because although the cars appear to be built without limitations, there are some requirements. Super Modified cars make use of carbon/composite body panels, large wings, wide racing slick tires and massive amounts of power. The fastest cars have 600 to 800 wheel-horsepower and reach speeds in excess of 180 mph on some courses.

== Format ==
Typical Redline Time Attack events occur over the course of a weekend.

=== Saturday ===
Saturday is conducted much like a typical HPDE and offers drivers an opportunity to practice. Drivers share the course with drivers of similar experience level for four to five sessions of 15 to 20 minute duration. Participation in Saturday practice is optional. Some drivers choose to participate only on Saturday perhaps because they are a novice driver not ready for competition or they simply choose not to compete. Redline Time Attack also offers driver instruction from professional driving instructors to anyone that requests it. Lap times on Saturday hold no weight in the competition on Sunday.

=== Sunday ===
==== Practice ====
Sunday begins with 2 additional practice sessions. Lap times recorded in these practice sessions are used to qualify the competitors for the Time Attack session. No points are awarded based on qualifying position.

==== Time Attack ====
The Redline style Time Attack consists of two sessions for each competitor for a total of six timed laps. Each session consists of one warm-up lap, three timed laps, and one cool down lap. Up to eight competitors may share the track for a Time Attack session, but the cars are staggered such that they typically will not encounter one another during the session. If a driver does catch the car ahead, safe passing is allowed. Only the fastest timed lap of the six total laps are used to rank the competitors. A competitor need not complete all six laps to be eligible for an award; a single lap is sufficient. Points are awarded to the drivers based on finishing position in their respective class.

==== Super Session ====
The Super Session is the finale of the event. The fastest competitors from the Time Attack amongst Street, Modified, and Super Modified classes are invited to participate in a five lap sprint race. Only vehicles with the necessary safety equipment are allowed to compete. One race with mixed classes is conducted in a traditional wheel-to-wheel format, with the grid arranged with the fastest cars up front and slowest in back. The field takes the green under a rolling start, and the winner is the first to cross the finish line after five laps. Passing is allowed at any time after the green flag. Points are awarded to the drivers based on finishing position.

As of 2011 Super Sessions were no longer a part of Redline Time Attack competitions.
