= Toyota GR Supra =

Fifth-generation Toyota Supra

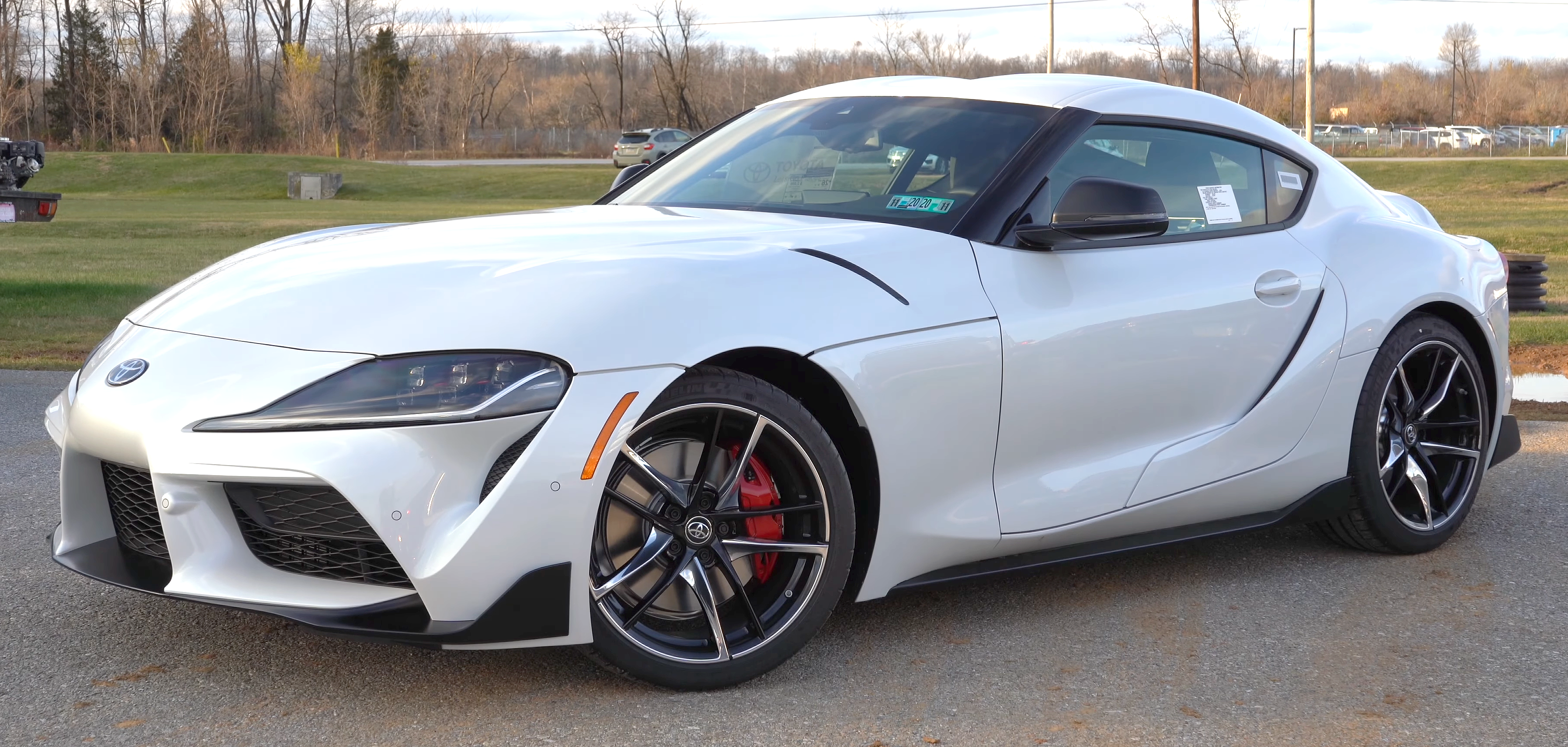

Overview
- Manufacturer: Toyota
- Model code: J29; DB; A90/A91 (for marketing purposes)
- Production: March 2019 – March 2026
- Model years: 2020–2026
- Assembly: Austria: Graz, Styria (Magna Steyr)
- Designer: Nobuo Nakamura (project chief designer)

Body and chassis
- Class: Sports car (S)
- Body style: 3-door liftback/fastback coupe
- Layout: Front-engine, rear-wheel drive
- Platform: Toyota-BMW joint sports car architecture
- Related: BMW Z4 (G29)

Powertrain
- Engine: Petrol: 1,998 cc (1.998 L; 121.9 cu in) BMW B48B20 turbo I4; 2,998 cc (2.998 L; 182.9 cu in) BMW B58B30C turbo I6; 2,998 cc (2.998 L; 182.9 cu in) BMW B58B30O1 turbo I6; 2,998 cc (2.998 L; 182.9 cu in) BMW B58B30M1 turbo I6
- Power output: 145–190 kW (194–255 hp; 197–258 PS) (2.0 L); 250–324 kW (335–434 hp; 340–441 PS) (3.0 L)
- Transmission: 8-speed ZF 8HP automatic (2019–2026); 6-speed ZF S6-53 manual (2022–2026)

Dimensions
- Wheelbase: 2,470 mm (97.2 in)
- Length: 4,380 mm (172.4 in)
- Width: 1,865 mm (73.4 in)
- Height: 1,290–1,295 mm (50.8–51.0 in)
- Curb weight: 1,410–1,520 kg (3,109–3,351 lb)

Chronology
- Predecessor: Toyota Supra (A80)

The Toyota GR Supra (model code J29/DB or A90/A91 for marketing purposes) is a sports car manufactured by Magna Steyr for Toyota from 2019 to 2026. The fifth-generation Supra, the GR Supra was sold under and developed by Toyota Gazoo Racing (TGR) brand in collaboration with BMW. It is the successor of the A80 Supra, which ceased production in 2002.

The GR Supra rides on a platform developed by Toyota and BMW, with a short wheelbase, wide track, and low centre of gravity, that also underpins the G29 BMW Z4. Initially, BMW considered using a pre-existing platform of their own to underpin the new Supra, but chief engineer Tetsuya Tada declined. Both cars are manufactured at the Magna Steyr plant in Graz, Austria.

The fifth-generation Supra uses BMW model code conventions, designated as a J29 series with DB model codes. However, Toyota used the "A90" and "A91" code for promotional and marketing materials for the fifth-generation Supra to maintain continuity from previous Supra generations.

The GR Supra ended production in March 2026 after a seven-year lifespan with no planned successor.

== Development ==
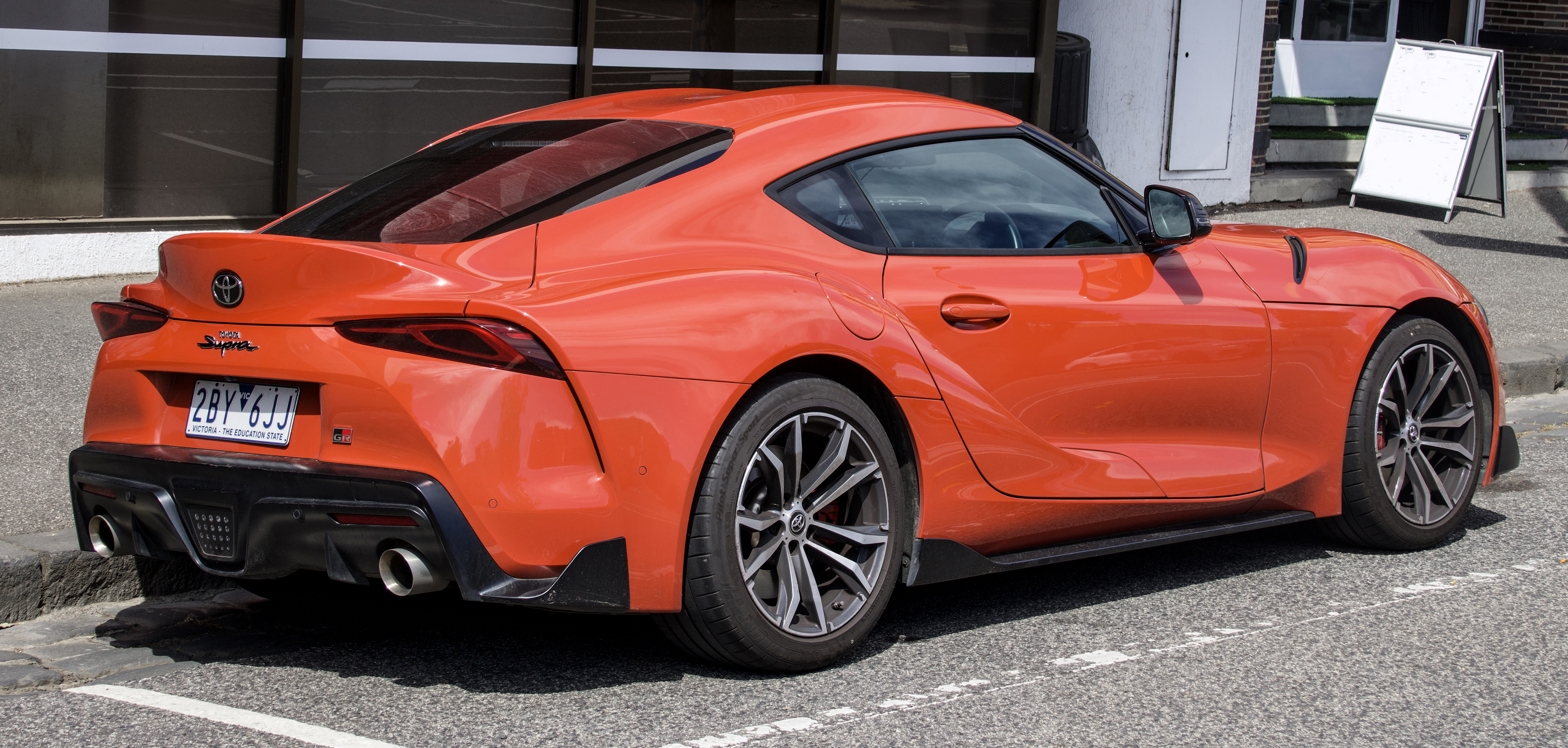
Rear view

Motor Trend had reported that a possible Supra successor could be based on the FT-HS (Future Toyota-Hybrid Sport), which debuted at the 2007 North American International Auto Show. The publication also reported that the fifth generation of the Supra could be powered by a 3.5-litre V-6 hybrid system generating over 298 kW (400 hp; 405 PS). Toyota quoted that it was not rushing for the Supra successor but instead was waiting to see how the sales and interests of the GT86/FR-S went.

In 2010, Toyota applied for a trademark for the Supra name. The trademark had to be used within three years for it to be valid. In December 2011, Autoguide reported a possible Supra replacement that would sit above the GT86. Tetsuya Tada, the chief engineer of the Toyota 86/Scion FR-S told reporters in Germany in 2012 "the president (Akio Toyoda) has asked me to make a successor to the Supra as soon as possible."

In late 2013, AutoBlog reported a Supra successor concept would be making its debut at the January 2014 North American International Auto Show. On 13 January, Toyota unveiled its new FT-1 concept car. Little is known about this new concept car; other than that it has a front engine and rear wheel drive layout. Toyota also stated that their new concept car draws inspiration from Toyota's past sports cars like the 2000GT, Supra, MR-2 and the 2007 FT-HS concept car. Toyota did not state whether the FT-1 would use the Supra name, or if it was even bound for production. However, Toyota did state if the FT-1 is approved from production, a price tag of around US$60,000 was to be expected for each unit. Upon the car's reveal, chief designer—Nobuo Nakamura—confirmed that the FT-1's design was used for inspiration for the Supra but the two cars differ in many ways. The production Supra was smaller and more of a pure sports car design, as opposed to the FT-1 being a larger grand tourer. According to Akio Toyoda, the new Supra's design and performance identity were inspired by the Toyota 2000GT. The interior design, layout, and parts (like the materials, seats, and steering wheel) were also done by Toyota, while only small interior switchgear come from BMW.

On 10 February 2014, Toyota submitted an application to the United States Patent and Trademark Office to renew the Supra trademark. In June 2016, a trademark application for the Supra nameplate was filed with the European Union Intellectual Property Office. According to Autocar, the new Supra was set to debut in 2018. The publication reported that the car would likely feature a rear wheel drive; and four-cylinder engines were expected to be available, and it had been confirmed that the car would offer a turbocharged inline-6 engine. It was believed that the engines would be supplied by BMW. Kleine Zeitung reported that the new jointly developed Supra will be produced at a Magna Steyr facility near Graz, Austria, alongside the BMW Z4 (G29). Although the sports car's name was yet to be officially confirmed, Toyota global chief engineer Tetsuya Tada said that it will likely carry the nameplate Supra, due to its historical significance to the nameplate. The final decision regarding the car's name was not made until the later stages of production.

On 12 July 2018, a pre-production version of the Supra was unveiled with a camouflage paint scheme at the Goodwood Festival of Speed. The car was confirmed to be a collaboration between Toyota and BMW with the new BMW Z4 (G29), but that the Supra is intended to be "much more hardcore and track-focused". Additionally, it was noted that the Supra was specifically engineered for an ideal 50–50 front-rear weight distribution. Tada also disclosed that the Supra was developed with benchmarking against the Porsche Cayman S (982), akin to the previous generation Supra's rivalry with the Porsche 968.

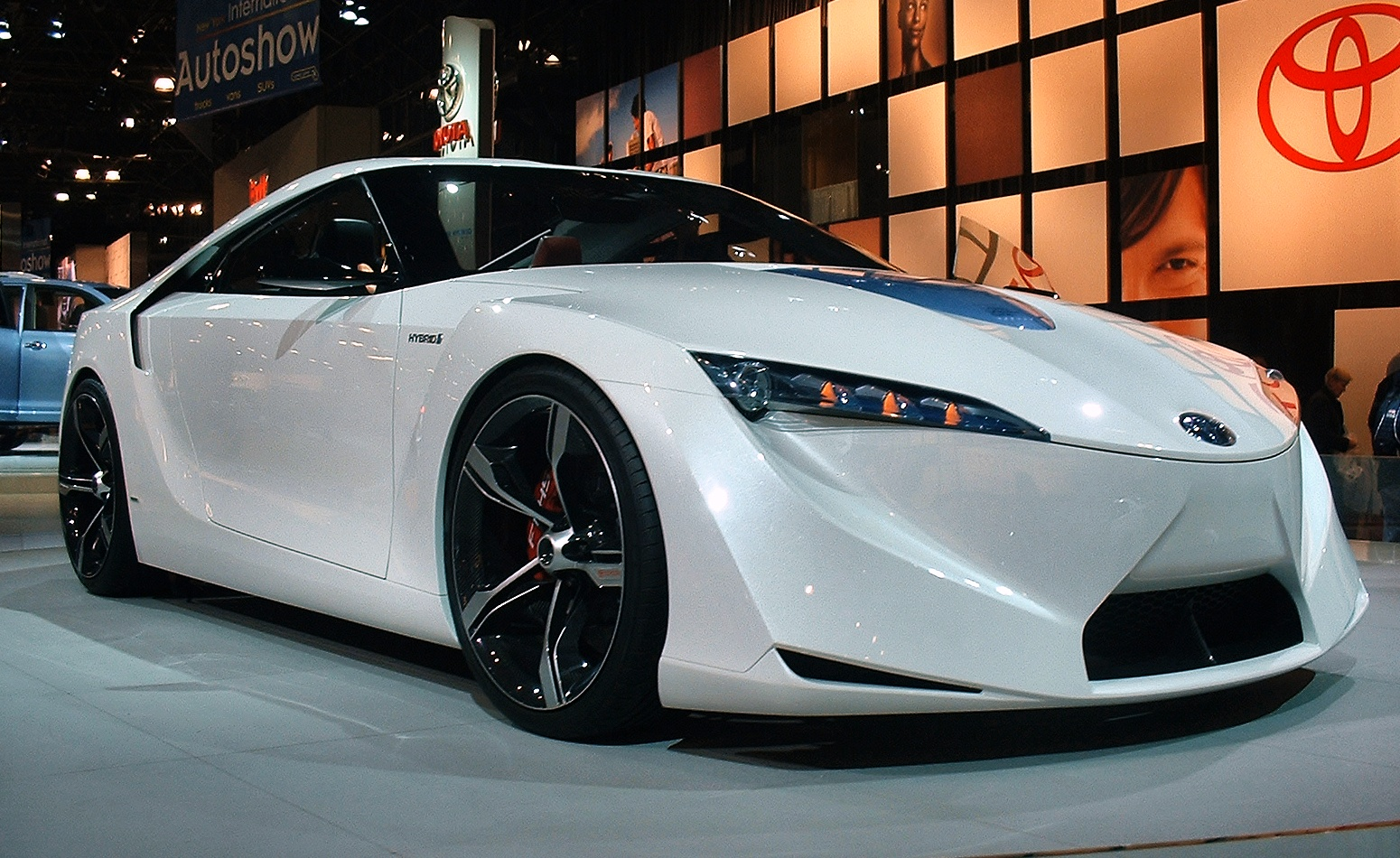
Toyota FT-HS concept (2007)

Toyota FT-1 concept (2014)

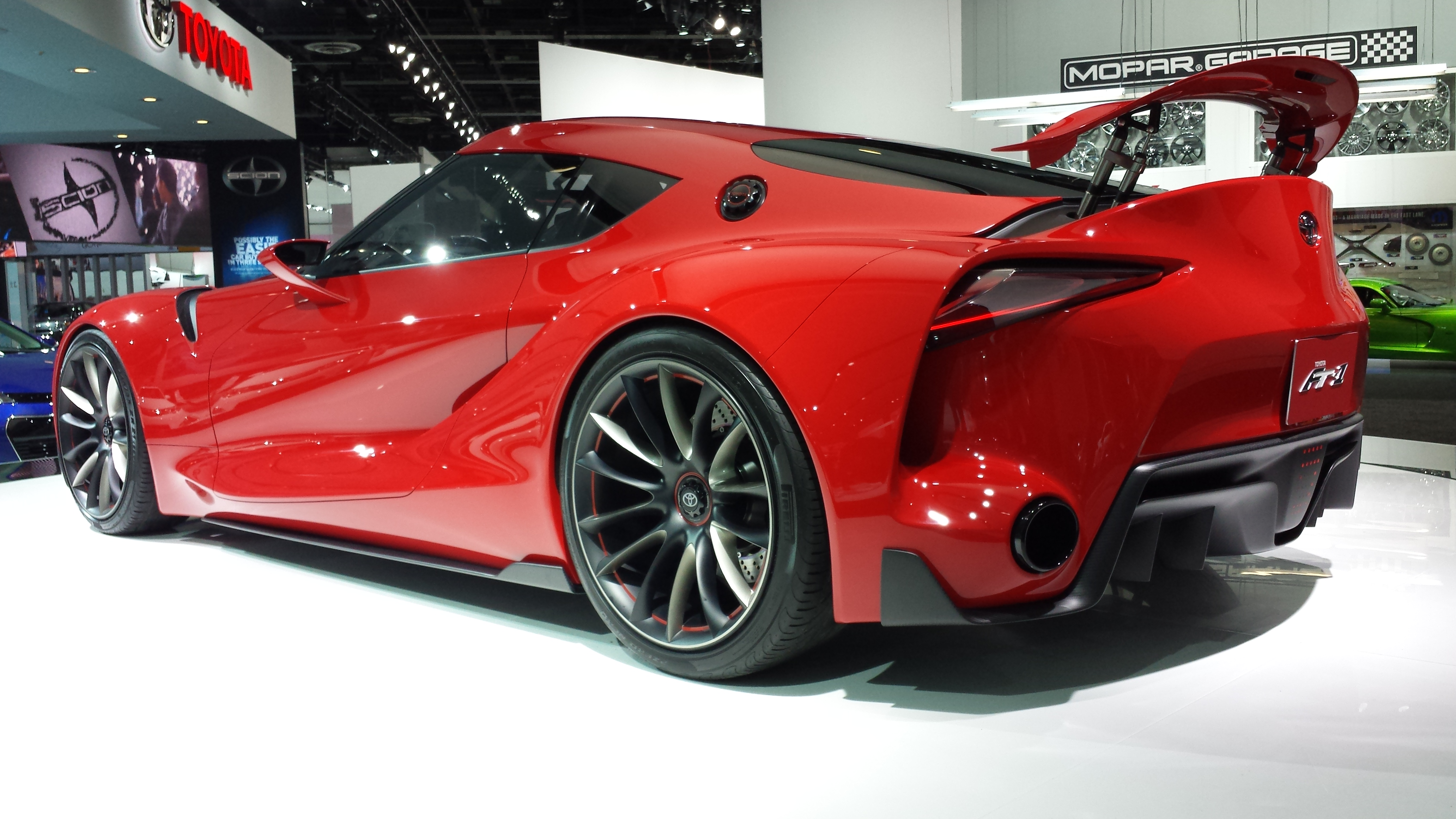
Toyota FT-1 concept rear (2014)

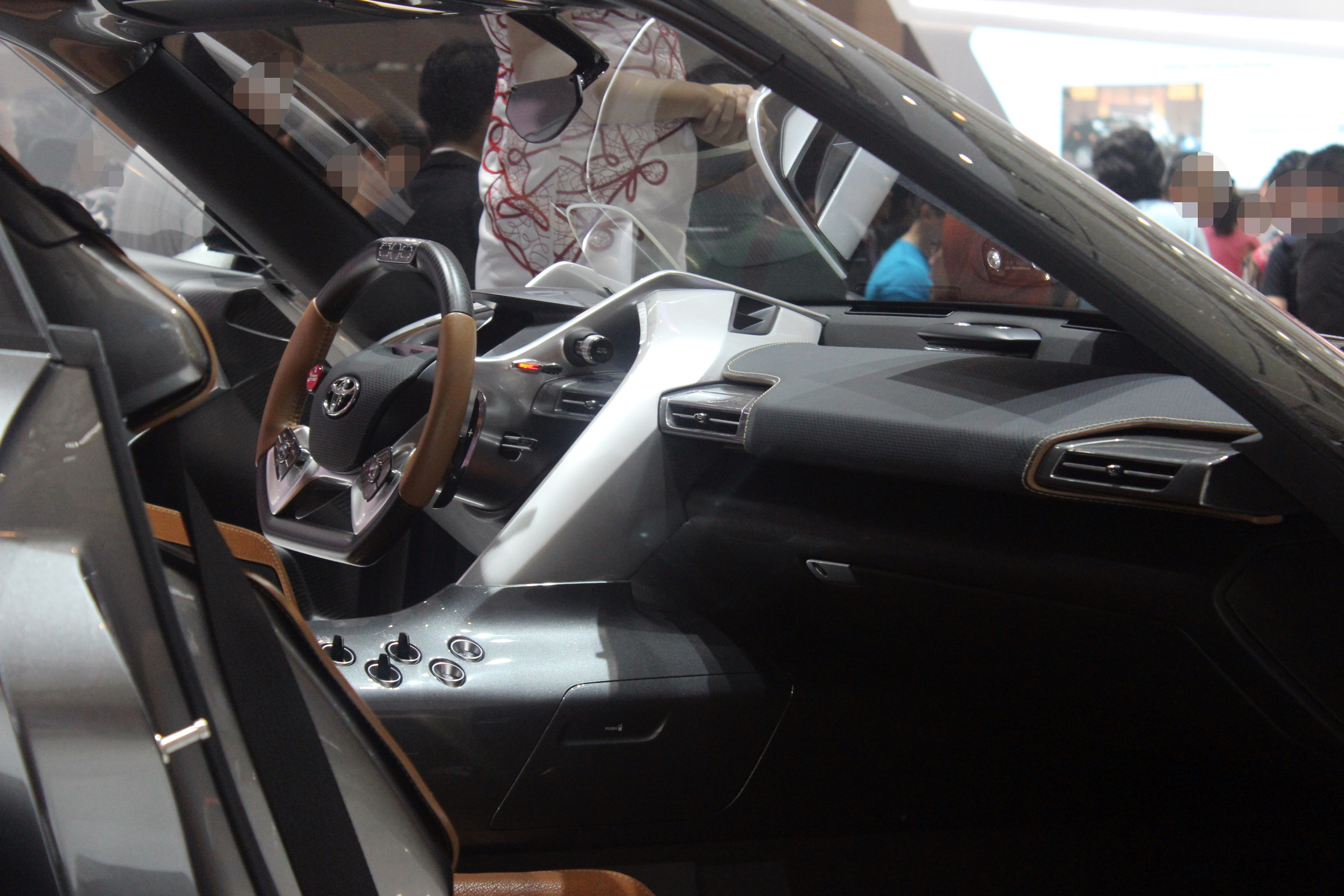
Toyota FT-1 concept interior (2014)

== Launch ==
The fifth-generation Supra was unveiled at the January 2019 North American International Auto Show in Detroit. The launch marked a 17-year hiatus since the previous generation was last sold. It was unveiled by Toyota CEO Akio Toyoda, who announced the Supra was tuned and developed with extensive testing at the Nürburgring, and how its performance and design lineage can be traced to the famed 2000GT. Two-time Formula 1 champion and Toyota Gazoo Racing driver Fernando Alonso was also present to help launch the Supra. The European launch was held at the 2019 Geneva International Motor Show.

The first production model was auctioned at a price of US$2.1 million at a Barrett-Jackson auction to Craig Jackson (chairman and CEO of the Barrett-Jackson auction house) in January 2019, with 100% of the money going to the American Heart Association and the Bob Woodruff Foundation. The auction car has a one-off matte grey exterior colour which is not offered on the standard Supra, as well as a red interior, metallic black five-bolt wheels, red wing mirrors, a signature from Toyota CEO Akio Toyoda on the dashboard and VIN 20201.

The Supra went on sale in Japan on 17 May 2019. In the United States, sales began on 22 July 2019 with a starting base price tag of US$49,990. In Australia, sales began on 2 September 2019.

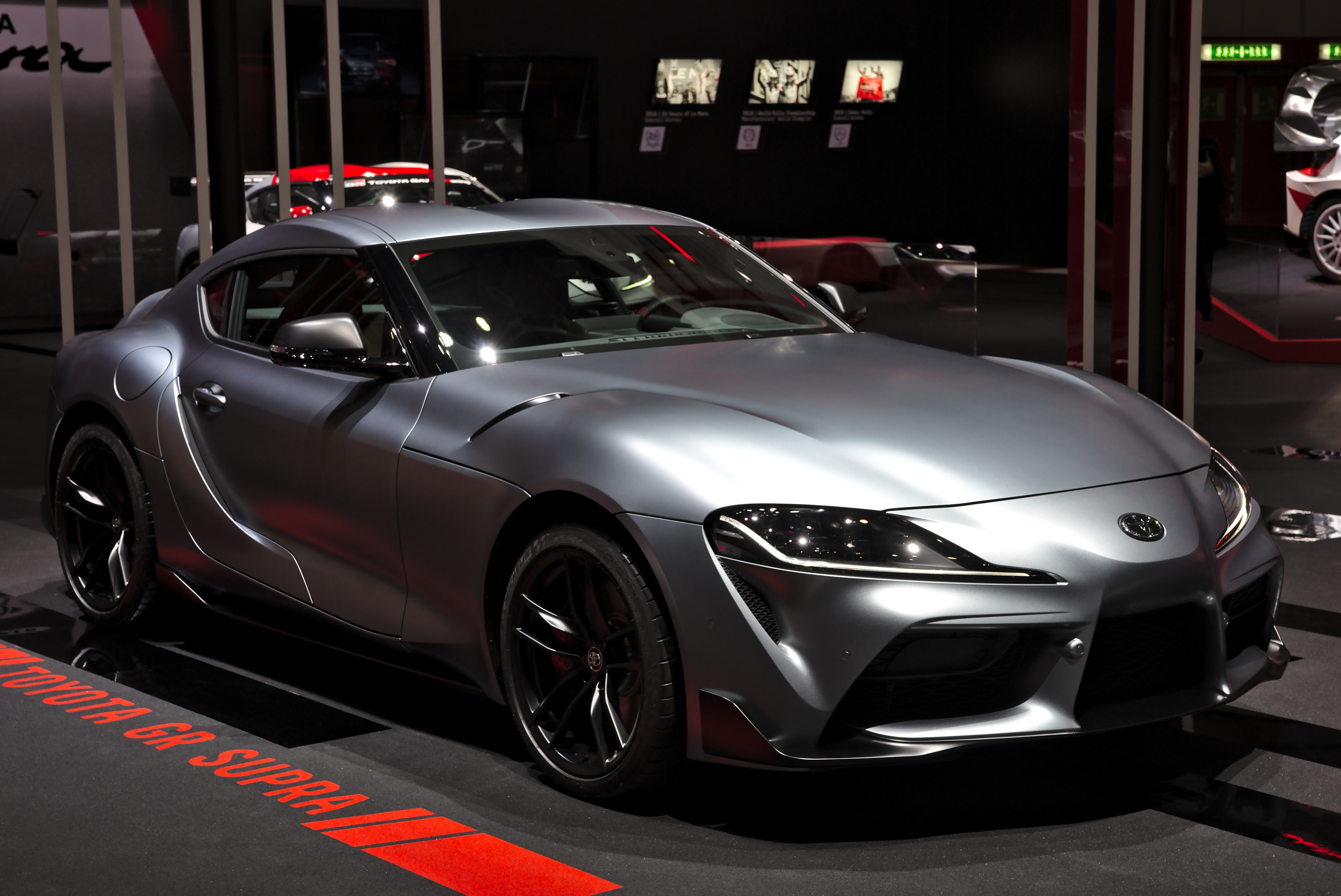
Toyota GR Supra at the 2019 Geneva International Motor Show

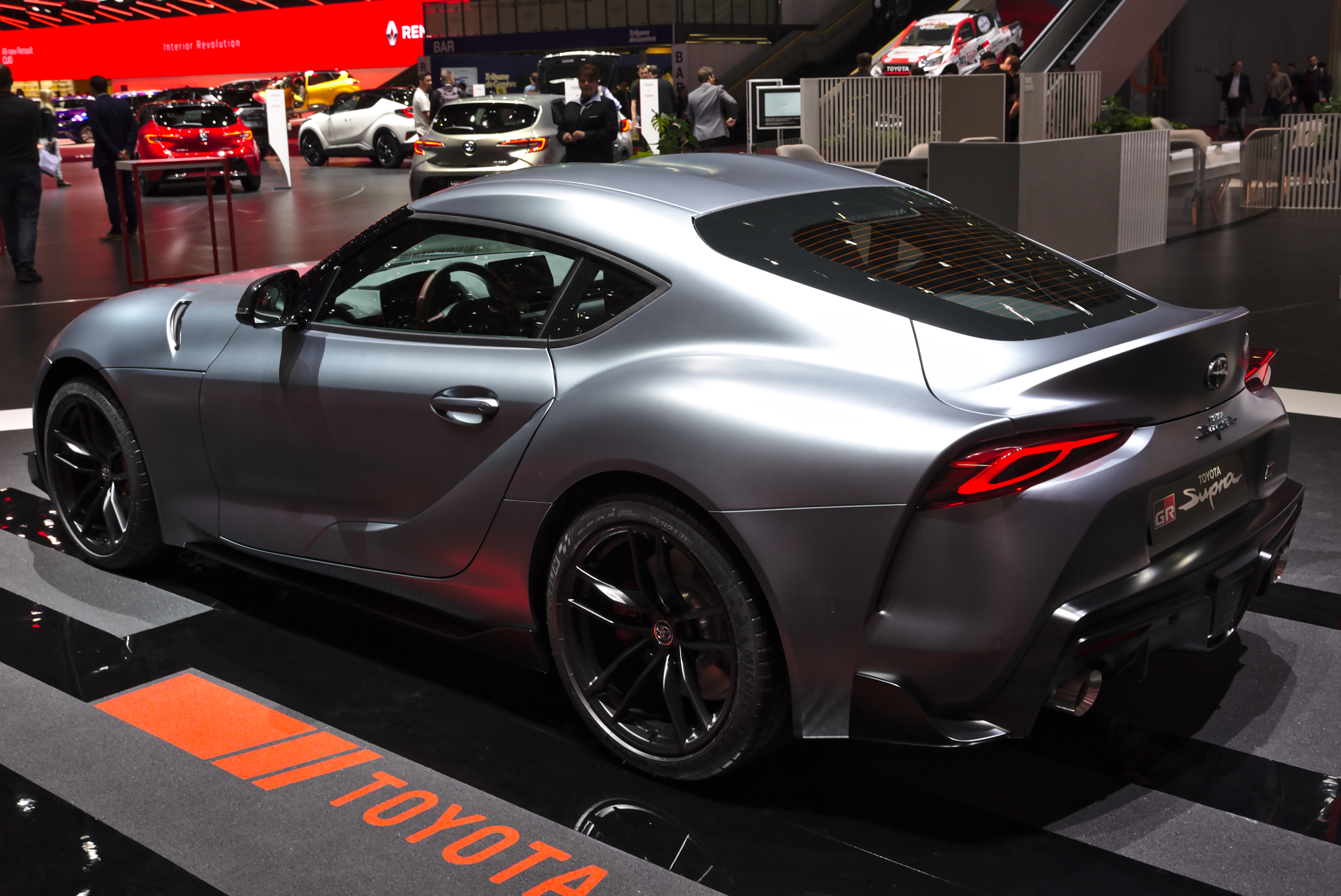
Rear view

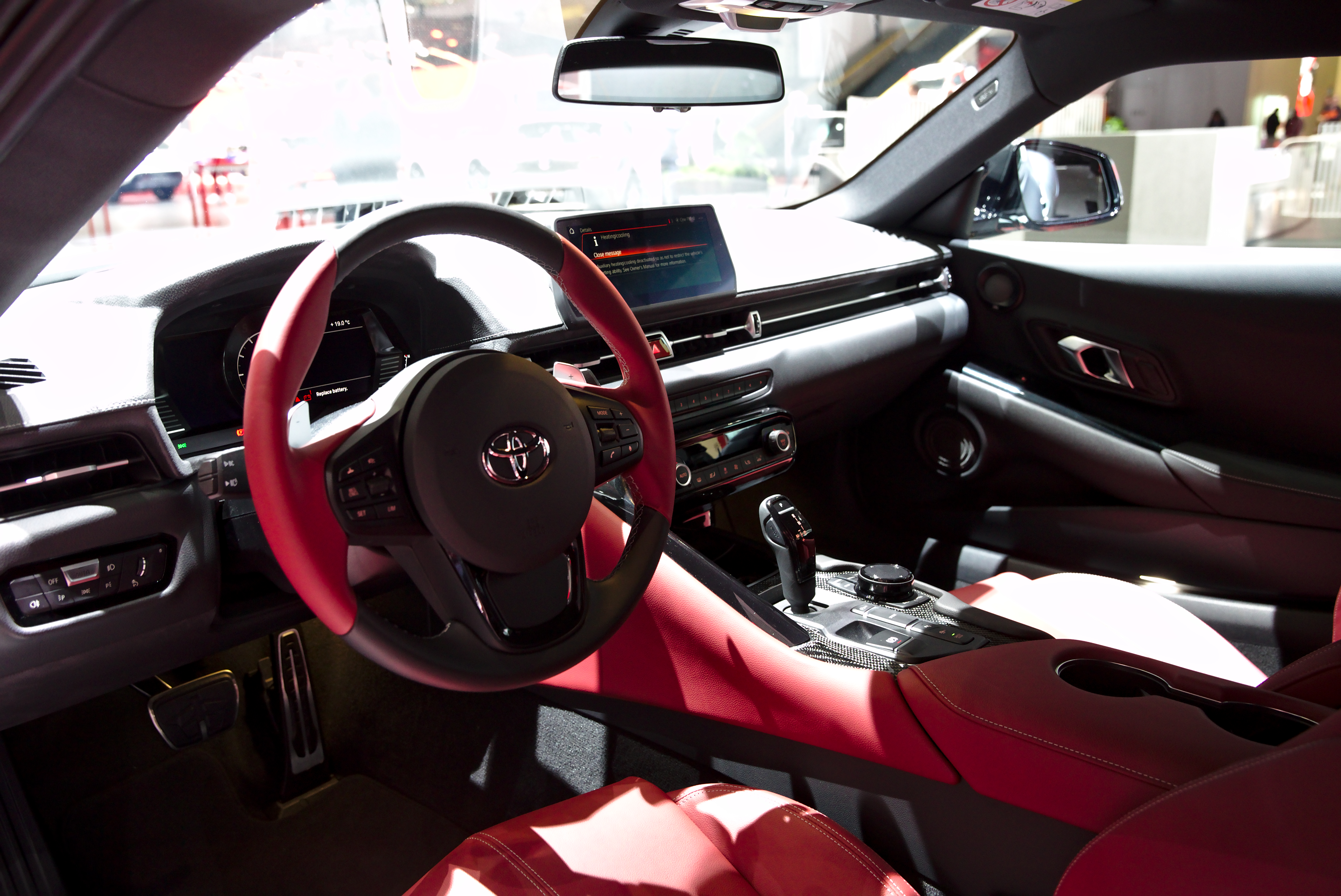
Interior

== Engineering and specifications ==
=== Powertrains ===
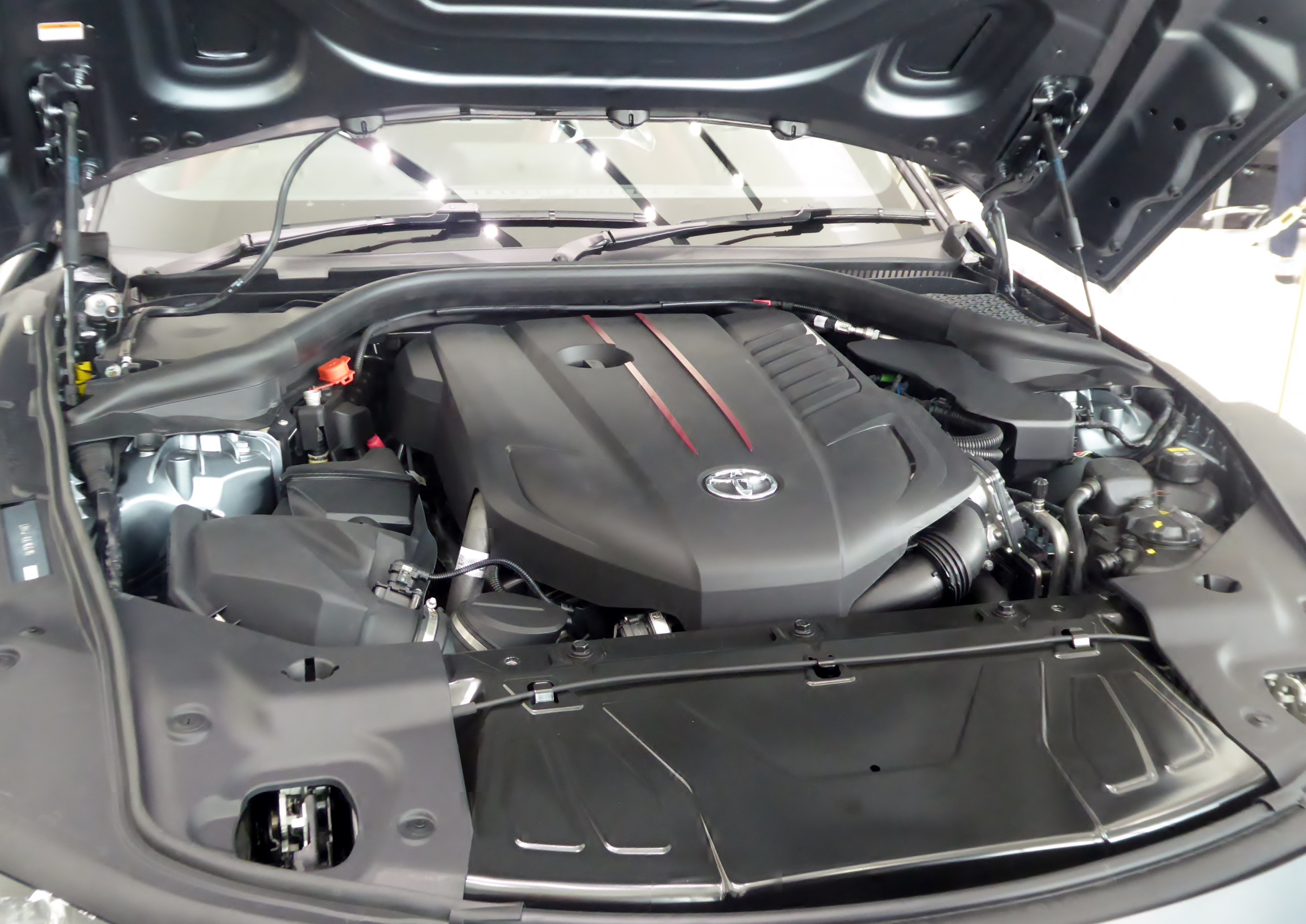
Inline-six BMW B58B30C engine in 3.0 models

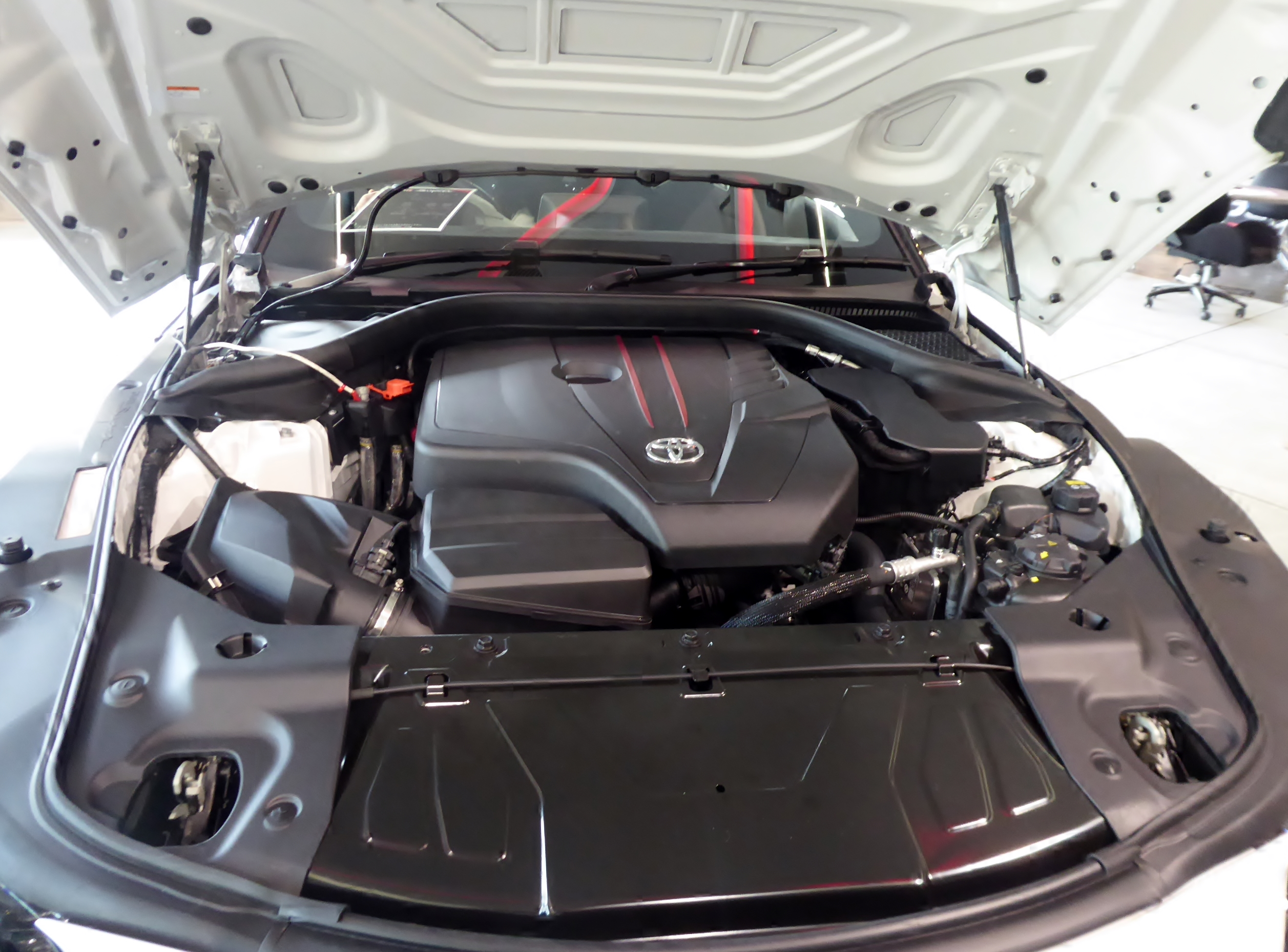
Inline-four BMW B48B20 engine in 2.0 models

The Supra is powered by two BMW-sourced engine options: a turbocharged B48 2.0-litre inline-four or a turbocharged B58 3.0-litre inline-six. The 2.0-litre engine was initially offered in Japan, some Asian countries and Europe; the United States received the engine in 2020 for the 2021 model year. The 2.0-litre engine has a power output of 145–190 kW (194–255 hp; 197–258 PS) from 4,500 to 6,500 rpm or 5,000 to 6,500 rpm and 320–400 N⋅m (236–295 lbf⋅ft) of torque from 1,450 to 4,200 rpm or 1,550 to 4,400 rpm, while the 3.0-litre engine has a power output of 250–285 kW (335–382 hp; 340–387 PS) from 5,000 to 6,500 rpm or 5,800 to 6,500 rpm and 495–500 N⋅m (365–369 lbf⋅ft) from 1,600 to 4,500 rpm or 1,800 to 5,000 rpm.

=== Drivetrains ===
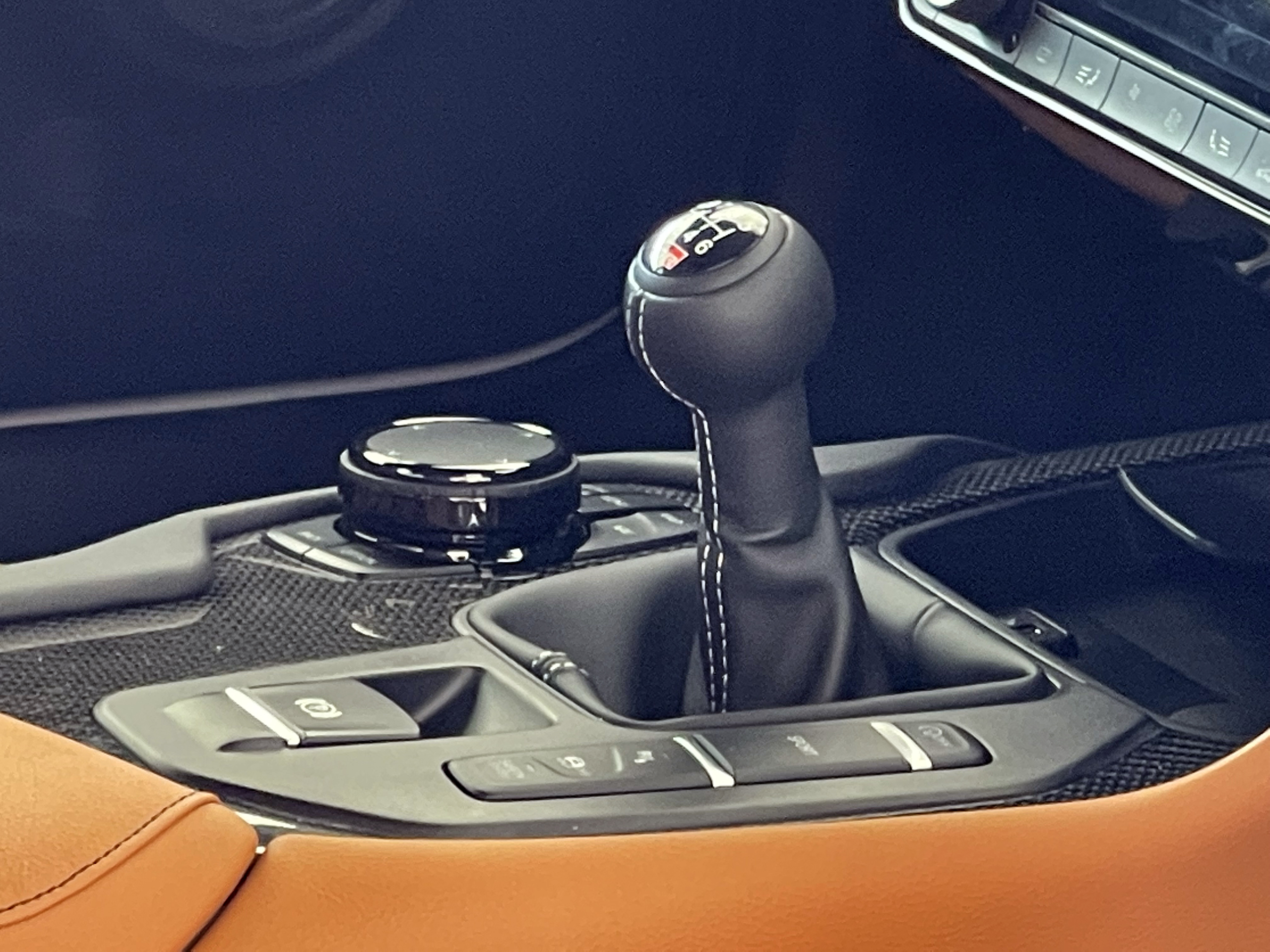
6-speed manual transmission offered from 2023 onwards

Power is sent to the rear wheels through a ZF 8HP 8-speed automatic transmission that was fully re-calibrated by Toyota, who also added their software to the gearbox for the Supra. Toyota initially considered to give the new Supra a dual-clutch automatic transmission, but went with the ZF 8HP for its smoothness, reliability, and weight savings. A manual transmission was initially not offered, due to the torque-converter automatic having quicker shifts, its ability to handle a lot of torque with self-awareness on its aftermarket potential, and wanting to differentiate it from the 86.

A specialized ZF S6-53 (GS6L50TZ) 6-speed manual transmission option was made available in 2022 for the 2023 model year for the six-cylinder engine only. Like the automatic, the manual transmission was built from a combination of ZF parts and custom Toyota parts, but receives a rev-matching function and a shorter final drive ratio compared to the automatic.

=== Performance ===
A test conducted by Car and Driver in December 2019 recorded the acceleration of the 3.0 L model from 0–97 km/h (0–60 mph) in 3.7 seconds (with 1-foot rollout), which is 0.3 seconds quicker than the time claimed by Toyota. The 402 m (1/4 mile) time was also recorded in 12.2 seconds at 183 km/h (114 mph). A test in August 2020 recorded the acceleration of the 2.0 L model from 0–97 km/h (0–60 mph) in 4.7 seconds and a 402 m (1/4 mile) time of 13.3 seconds at 167 km/h (104 mph).

German magazine Sport Auto set a lap time in August 2019 on the Nürburgring Nordschleife with a 2020 GR Supra on factory Michelin Pilot Super Sport tyres of 7:52.17 minutes.

=== Engineering ===
Before production, Toyota wanted to develop and engineer a rear-wheel drive sports car that would compete against the Porsche Cayman S (982), while BMW wanted to build a roadster, which gave them the idea of co-developing an all-new platform that would handle both coupe and convertible variants with great rigidity and handling of torque. The platform takes some elements from BMW M's cars, such as the suspension design, forged control arms and electronic differential, all while being able to reduce costs for production and the final product. After co-developing the platform together, Toyota and BMW went to develop the rest of the two cars separately, such as chassis development, exterior and interior designs, and tuning of both drivetrain and suspension. For example, on the Supra, the side sills are significantly wider and stiffer, there is more chassis bracing, and Toyota moved the engine backwards in the engine bay for better weight distribution. The fake vents on the car's exterior were also leftovers from its race car prototype, and were designed so that the aftermarket car community could make them functional.

=== Final Edition ===
In late November 2024, Toyota unveiled the A90 Final Edition for Europe and Japan, which serves as the last edition of the A90 Supra.

The A90 Final Edition includes parts sourced from and inspired by the GT4 race car, such as carbon-fibre front spoiler, canards, removable bonnet duct, and swan-neck rear wing, as well as the rear subframe from the race car and extra bracing. This special edition receives various upgrades such as new KW suspension, Akrapovič titanium exhaust, Brembo 15.6-inch front rotors and four-piston calipers, forged 19-inch front and 20-inch rear wheels, Michelin Pilot Sport Cup 2 tyres, and carbon-fibre Recaro Podium CF seats.

The model has a 70 kW (94 hp) and 70 N⋅m (52 lb⋅ft) power increase over the standard 3.0 model, bringing total power to 324 kW (434 hp) and torque to 571 N⋅m (421 lb⋅ft). Power upgrades were achieved through revising the intake air path, adapting the low-back-pressure catalyst for reduced pressure loss, and optimizing engine controls. Additionally, a baffle plate has been added to the engine oil pan to prevent uneven oil distribution under higher g-forces, and cooling has been improved by adding a sub-radiator, enlarging the differential gear cover cooling fins, and strengthening the radiator cooling fan.

The A90 Final Edition is limited to 300 units, with 150 going to Japan, and the remaining 150 for Europe.

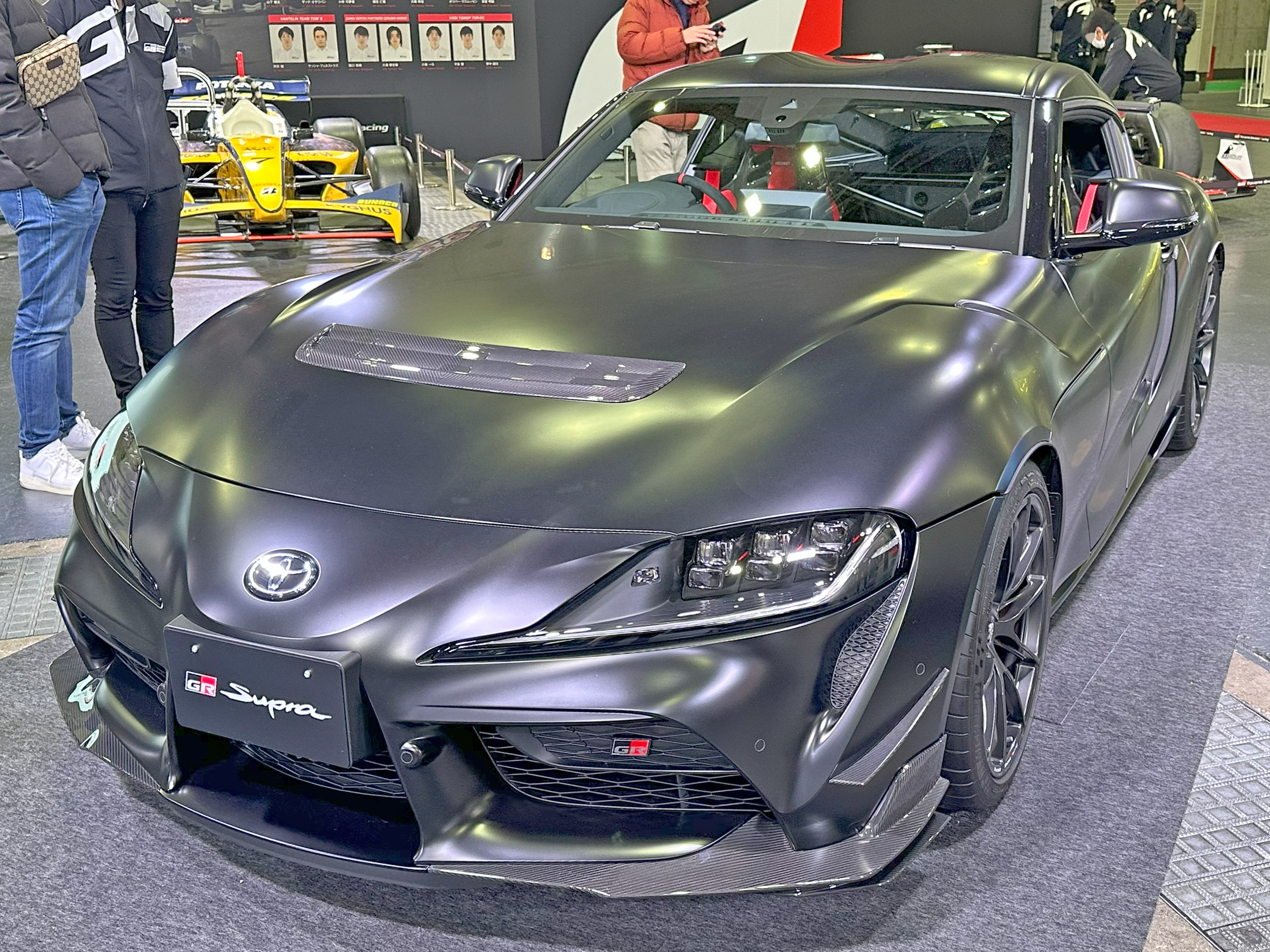
Toyota Supra A90 Final Edition prototype (Japan)

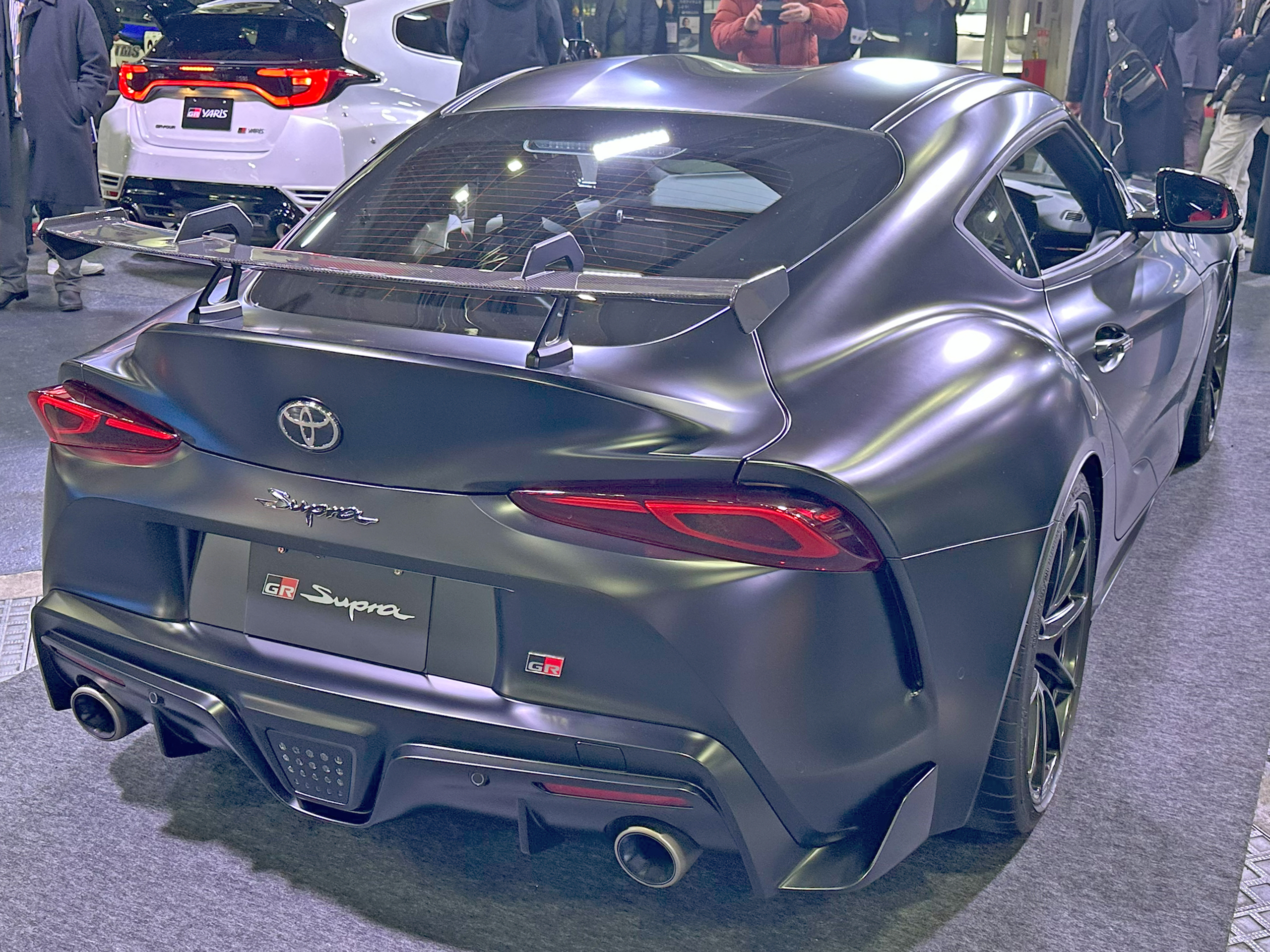
Toyota Supra A90 Final Edition prototype rear view

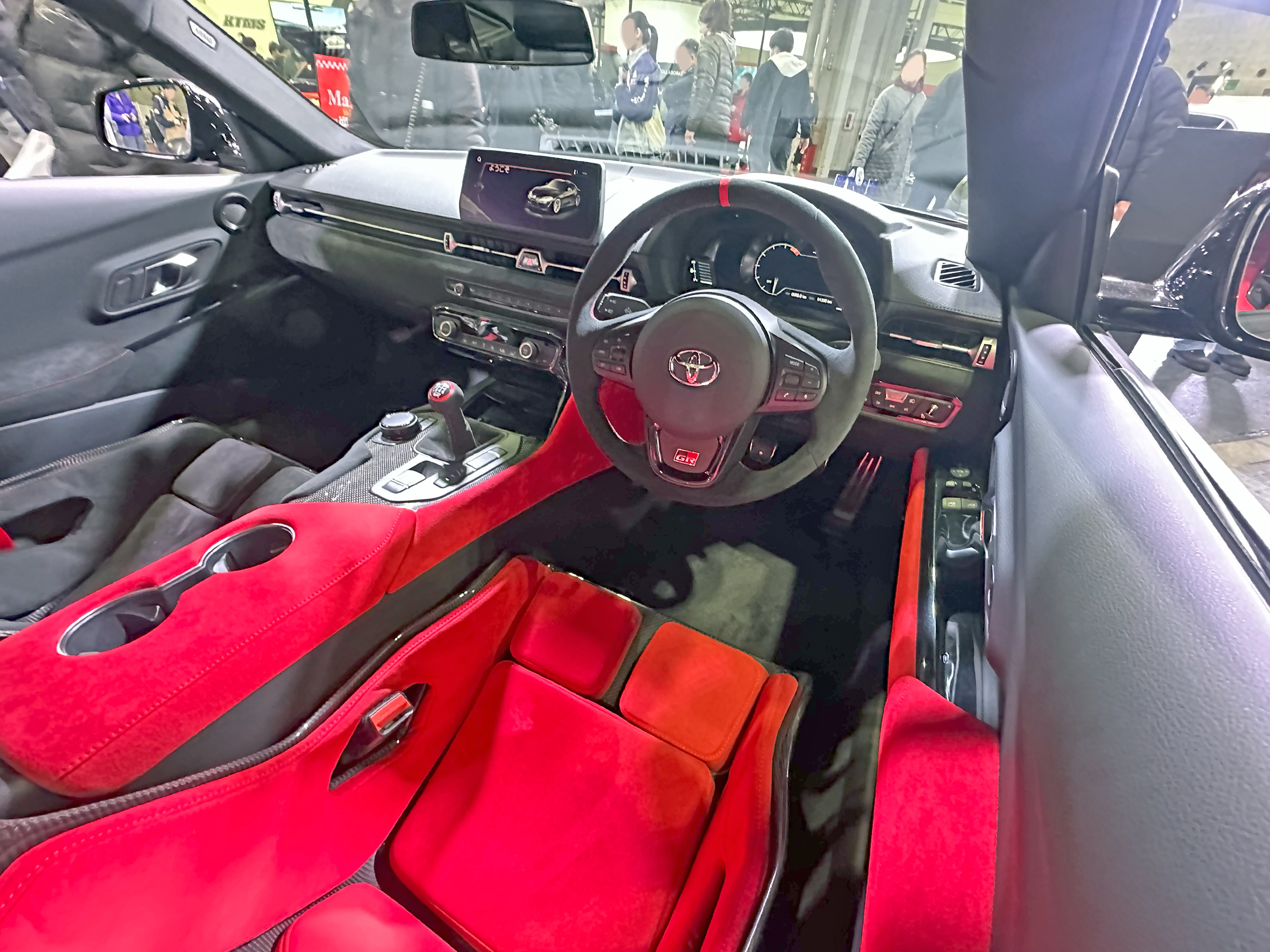
Toyota Supra A90 Final Edition prototype interior

== Markets ==
=== Japan ===
The Supra is offered in three trim levels, which are the SZ, SZ-R and RZ. The SZ model is powered by the 145 kW (194 hp; 197 PS) 2.0-litre engine and is equipped with 17-inch single tone wheels, manual seats, black fabric upholstery, dark silver trim and a 4-speaker sound system. The SZ-R model is powered by the 190 kW (255 hp; 258 PS) variation of the 2.0-litre engine and is equipped with 18-inch two tone wheels, eight-way powered seats, Alcantara/black leather upholstery, carbon fibre trim, 8.8-inch touchscreen multimedia system with 12-speaker JBL stereo sound system and a head-up display.

The RZ model is powered by the 3.0-litre engine and is equipped with 19-inch two tone wheels. It also has the same interior equipments as the SZ-R model, with the difference being the use of Alcantara/red leather upholstery (black leather is available as an option) and sports pedals. A "Sport" mode and dual-zone climate control system, as well as the Toyota Supra Connect infotainment system is standard on all three trim levels. They are also equipped with Toyota Supra Safety suite, which features autonomous emergency braking, lane departure alert, blind spot monitor, adaptive cruise control and rear-cross traffic alert. GR Parts is also available, which includes the Toyota Gazoo Racing Recorder, which allows drivers to log their driving data to an SD card. This can be supplemented by using an optional dashcam, which synchronises the video with recorded information.

In 2020, the Japanese-spec GR Supra was improved. For the RZ grade, the output of the 3-litre engine was increased to 289 kW (387 hp). The Horizon Blue Edition was released, 100 units was produced the same year.

In 2021, the 35th Anniversary Edition was released in Japan with a limited run of 35 units, to mark the 35th anniversary of the launch of the first Japanese-market Supra, the 1986 Toyota Supra (A70). Based on the RZ and SZ-R models, both models share matte black painted 19-inch forged aluminium wheels and a 35th-anniversary carbon ornament. In addition, the SZ-R grade is specially equipped with sports brakes with red painted calipers, matte black painted door mirrors.

In 2022, the RZ grade became available with a 6-speed manual transmission and the 19-inch two tone wheels was replaced by new forged 19-inch alumunium wheels. A new tan-coloured interior has been added as an option for the RZ grade.

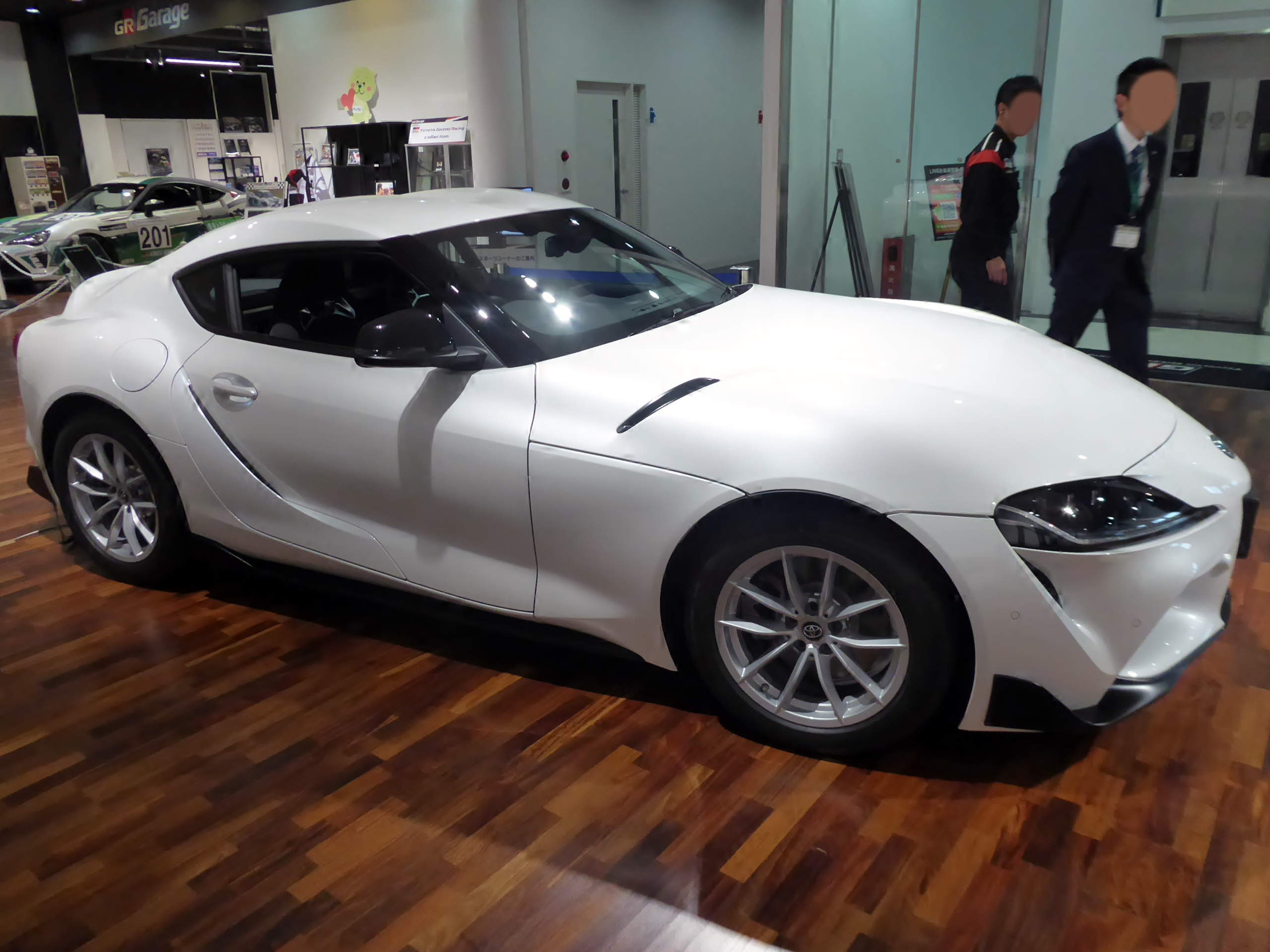
Toyota GR Supra SZ (DB82, Japan)

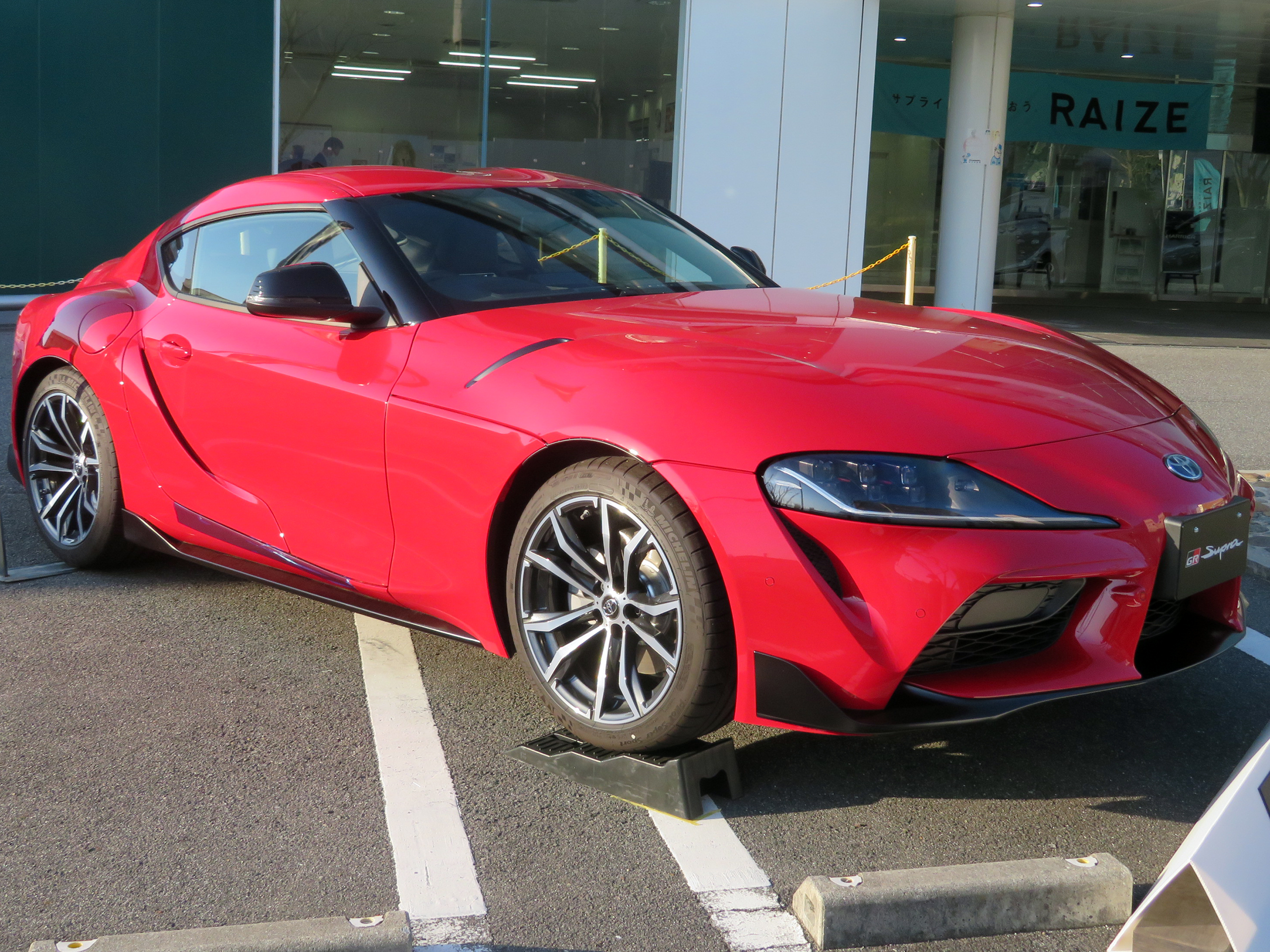
Toyota Supra SZ-R (DB22, Japan)

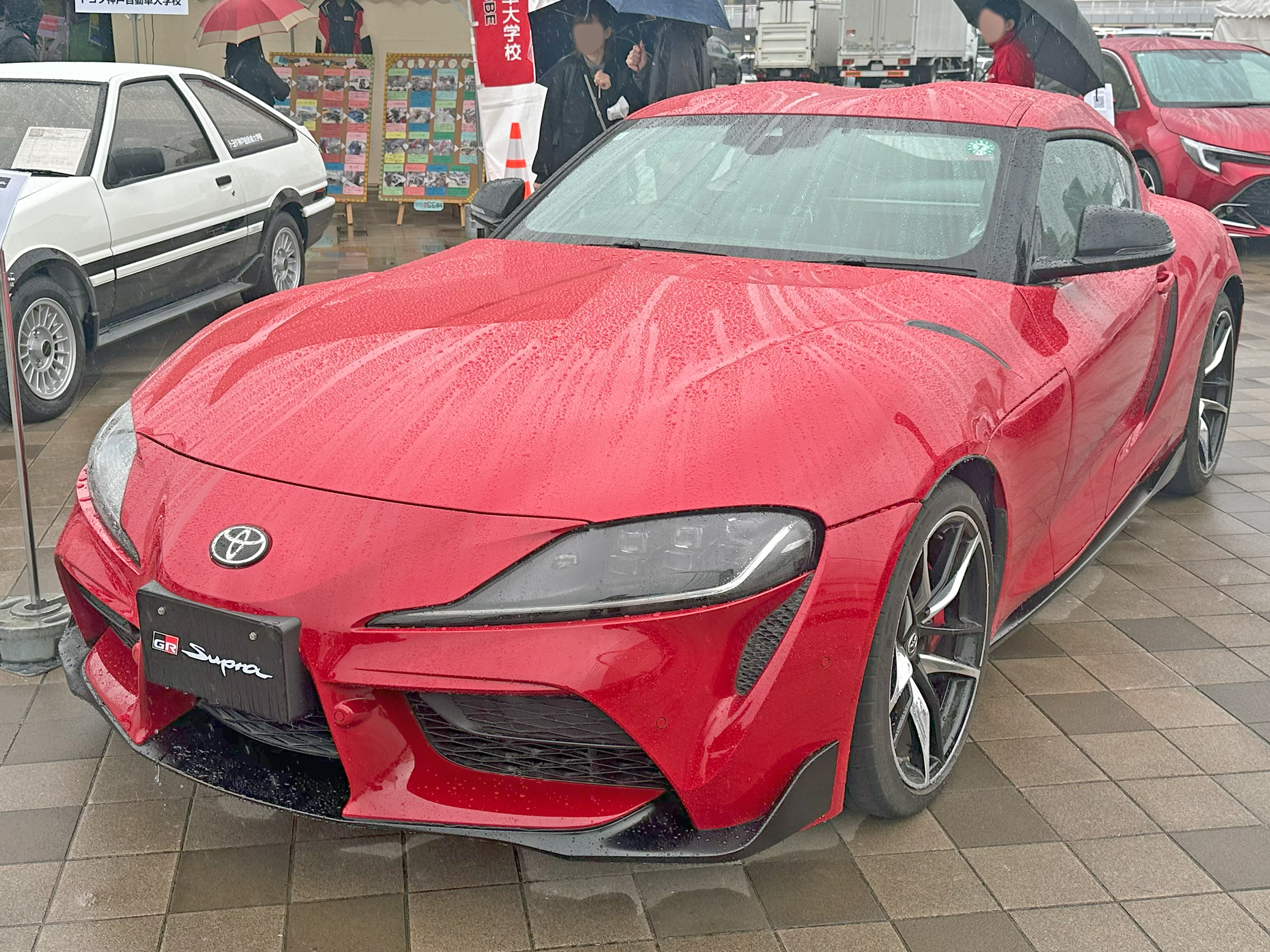
2019 Toyota Supra RZ (DB42, Japan)

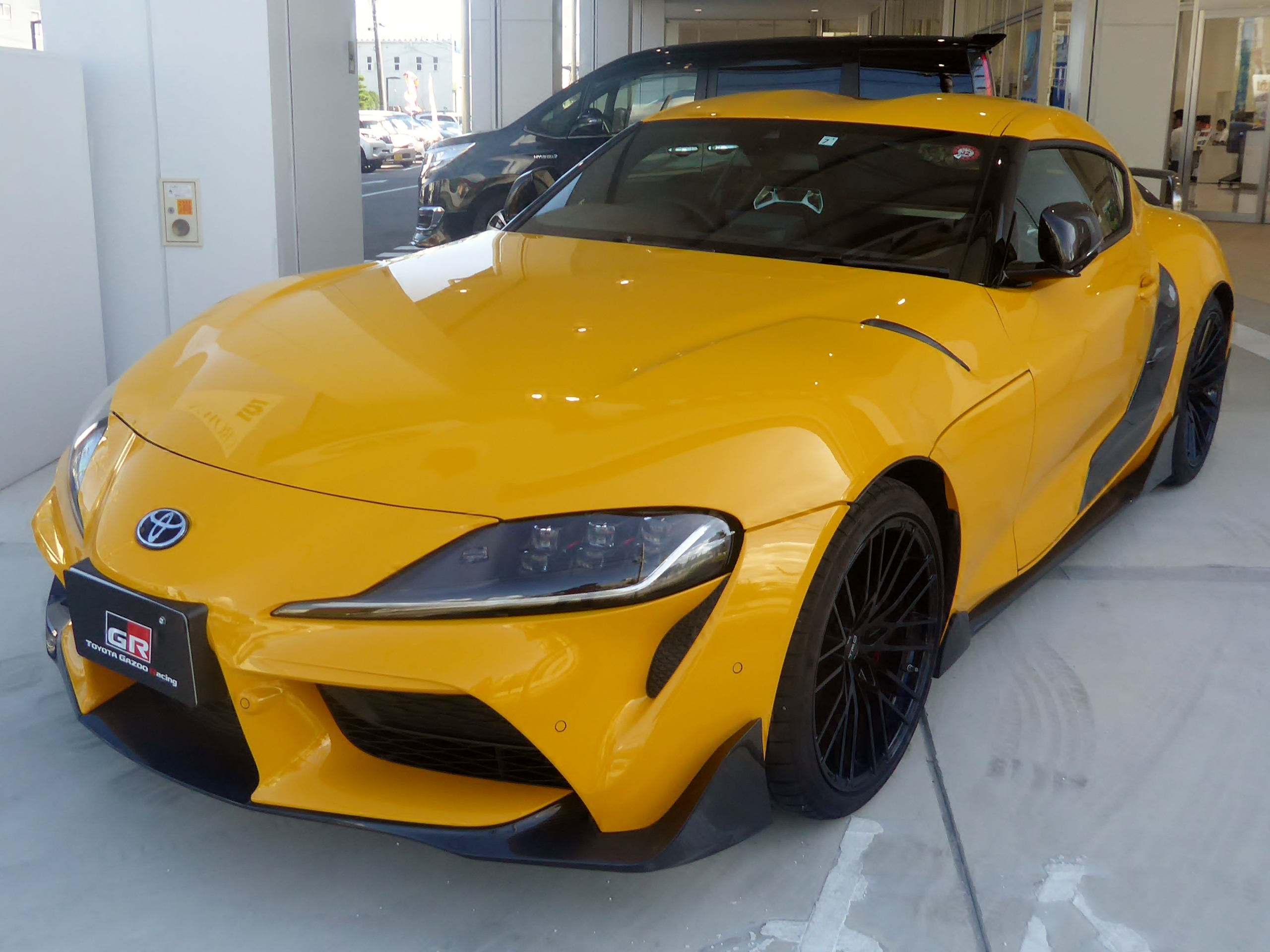
Toyota GR Supra with optional GR Parts

=== United States ===
The GR Supra was originally offered in the US in two variants, the 3.0 and 3.0 Premium. The 3.0 variant has a 6.5-inch centre touchscreen multimedia system with Bluetooth and standard Alcantara trimmed seats, while the 3.0 Premium has a larger touchscreen multimedia system (8.8-inches), standard navigation, wireless Apple CarPlay, 12-speaker JBL stereo sound system, wireless phone charging, colour head-up display and heated leather seats. All variants have collision warning, automatic high beams, automatic emergency braking with pedestrian detection, lane departure warning and a feature that recognizes road signs as standard.

In 2020, for the 2021 model year, two new models, the A91 Edition and the 2.0, was introduced. For the 3.0, 3.0 Premium, and A91 Edition, the output of the 3-litre engine was increased to 285 kW (382 hp) and 499 N⋅m (368 lb⋅ft) of torque. This increase in power is due to revised engine tuning, 10.2:1 compression ratio, and a six-port cylinder head and six-port turbo manifold, as opposed to the 11:1 compression ratio, two-port version for the 2020 model year. Additionally for the 2021 model year, the rear suspension bushings were updated and chassis stiffening bars were added to the engine bay. The 2.0 will feature the same 2-litre engine used in the SZ and SZ-R models sold in Japan, and is rated at 190 kW (255 hp) and 400 N⋅m (295 lb⋅ft) of torque.

In 2022, for the 2023 model year, the Supra 3.0 and 3.0 Premium became available with a 6-speed manual transmission and an A91 MT edition.

In 2024, for the 2025 model year, the 2.0 litre engine was dropped.

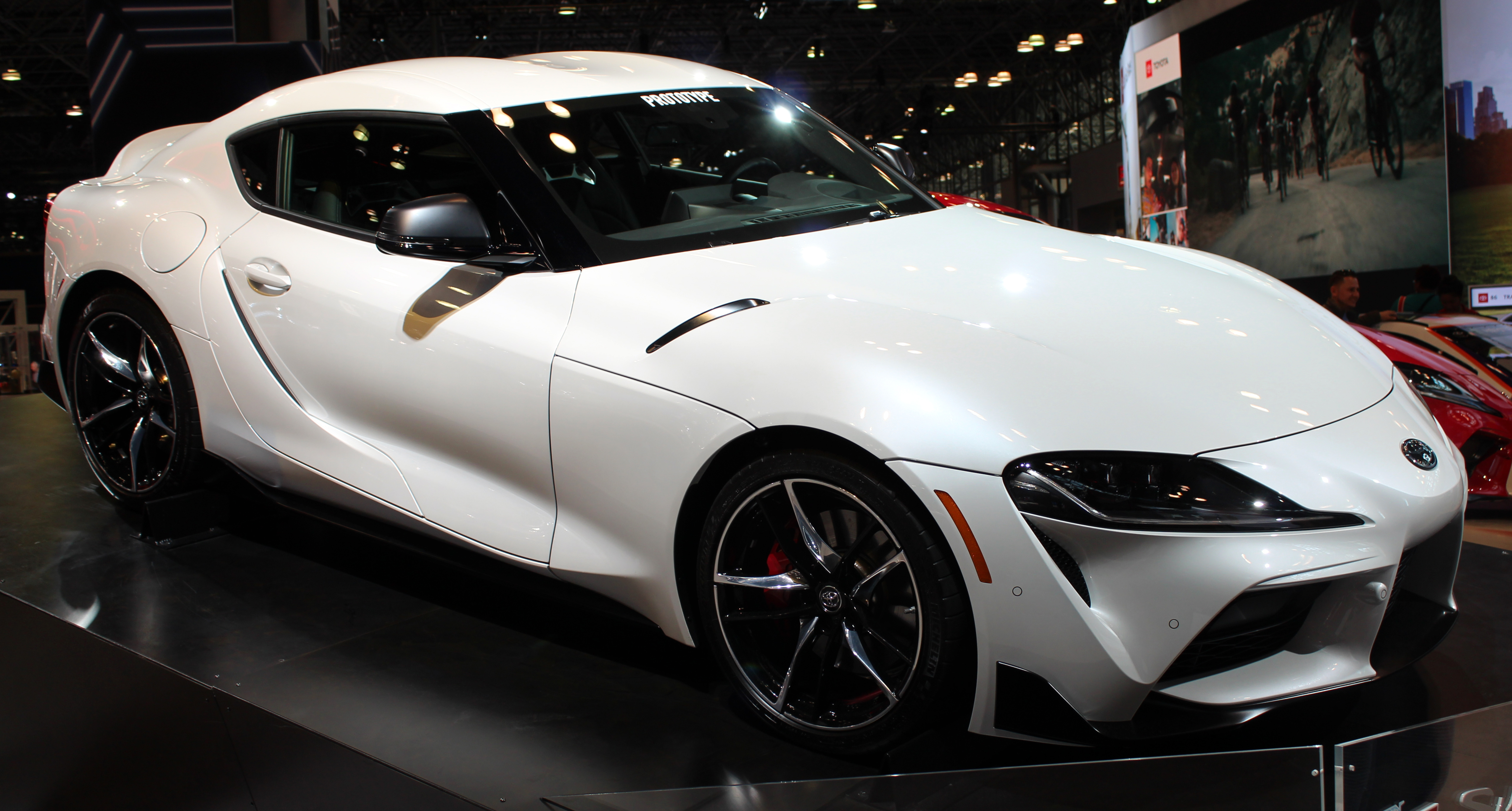
US market Toyota Supra at NYIAS 2019

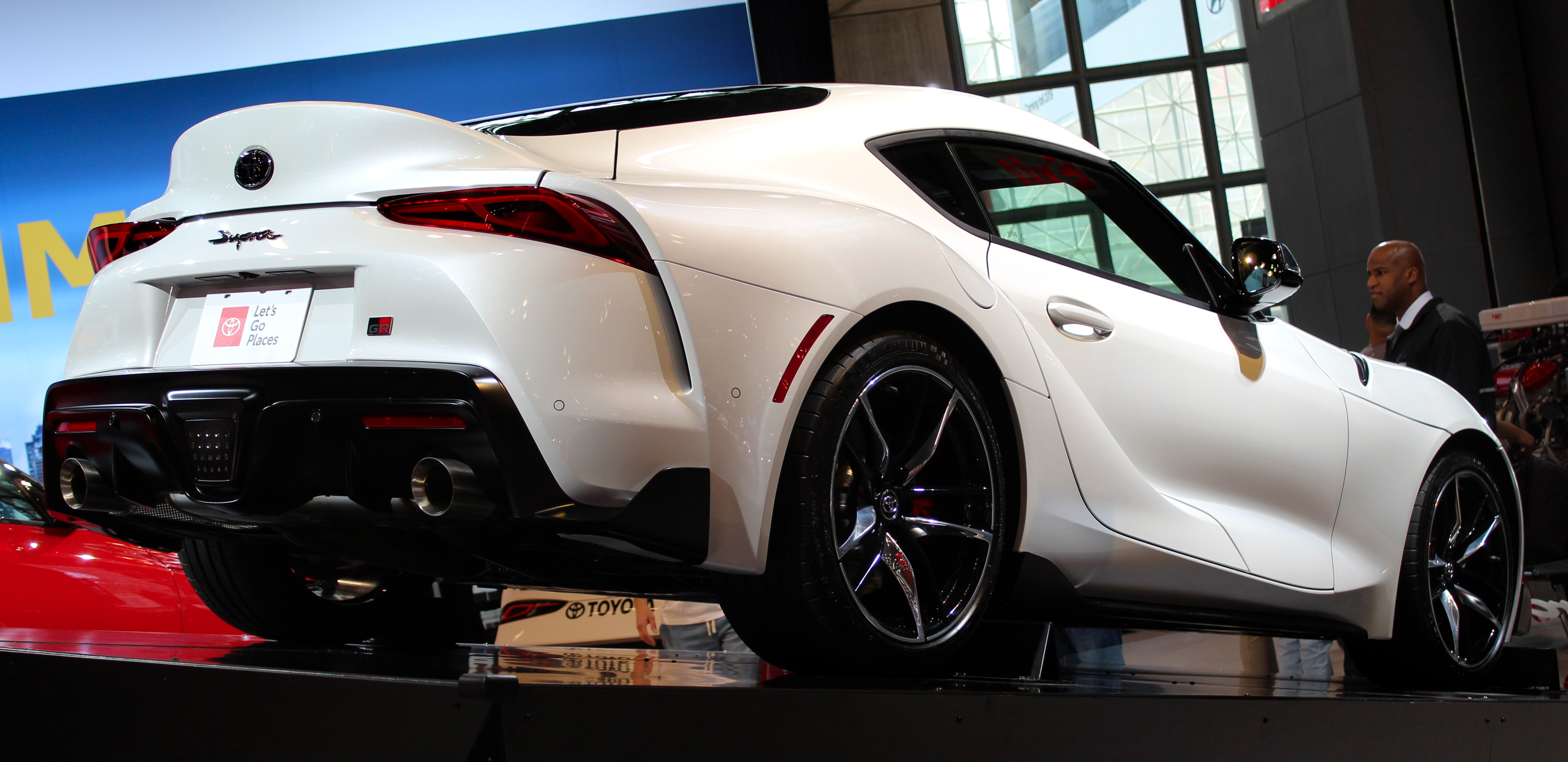
US market Toyota Supra rear at NYIAS 2019

==== Special Editions ====
At launch in the US, Toyota announced they would release a special edition for each model year of the fifth-generation Supra's release cycle. To date, all special editions are based on the 3.0 Premium, and offer distinct details from standard models, while being produced in limited quantities.

In 2019, for the 2020 model year, the first 1,500 cars produced for the US were released as special Launch Edition variants and are offered in three colours: Absolute Zero White, Nocturnal Black and Renaissance Red 2.0. Cars that have the white or black exterior colour have the same red interior as the auction car, which is only offered in the Launch Edition, while the red cars have a black interior. All Launch Edition cars have red coloured wing mirrors, all-black wheels, and an individually-numbered carbon fibre plaque with a replica of Akio Toyoda's signature fixed to the dashboard, mirroring the auction car.

In 2020, for the 2021 model year, a new A91 Edition was released, marking the updated platform featuring the new higher output 3-litre engine, and was limited to 1,000 units. The A91 naming implies a new model from the A90, due to the updated engine, but the chassis code remains the same. The A91 Edition is offered in two colours: an exclusive Refraction Blue and Nocturnal Black, both featuring exclusive matte black stripes on the C-pillars and a carbon fibre rear lip spoiler. It features an exclusive black leather and Alcantara interior with blue stitching and accents. It also includes matte black wheels, carbon fibre mirror caps, and a custom stitched key cover matching the interior.

The A91-CF Edition was released in 2021, for the 2022 model year, limited to only 600 units. The A91-CF Edition is named "CF" for the special carbon fibre body kit consisting of a front splitter, side skirts, rear spats, and a rear duckbill spoiler. Additionally, matte black wheels, and a red and black leather/Alcantara interior with special stitching is included. It was released in Absolute Zero White, Nitro Yellow, and matte Phantom Gray paint colour options.

With the launch of a new 6-speed manual transmission offering in the Supra in 2022 for the 2023 model year, a limited A91-MT Edition was released with a limited run of 500 units. In addition to the new manual transmission, it is offered in two exclusive colours, Matte White and CU Later Gray, and an exclusive Cognac tan leather interior. The A91-MT Edition also includes exclusive red badging, red GR engine bay strut brace, and Frozen Gunmetal Gray wheels.

In 2023, for the 2024 model year, the 45th Anniversary Edition was released in North America with a limited run of 900 units, to mark the 45th anniversary of the launch of the first Supra, the 1978 Celica Supra. The model is offered in an exclusive Mikan Blast orange paint colour along with Absolute Zero white, and has an exclusive black side panel stripe graphic with a cutout Supra logo. It features a manually-adjustable rear spoiler which rises approximately 75 mm (3 inches) above the rear decklid, with an adjustment screw to change the angle of the spoiler for different effects on downforce per the driver's preference. The 45th Anniversary Edition also features matte-black 19-inch aluminium wheels and black painted brake callipers with a GR logo graphic. The orange colour and styling are stated by Toyota to be a tribute towards a custom Mk IV Supra of "big-screen fame", which is reputed to be the similarly orange Mk IV Supra featured in the 2001 film The Fast and the Furious.

In 2025, Toyota announced that the 2026 model year would be the final model year of this generation, announcing the Final Edition with production ending in March 2026. It will use the standard US engine with 285 kW (382 hp), even though the Final Edition in other parts of the world will have a 320 kW (429 hp) engine.

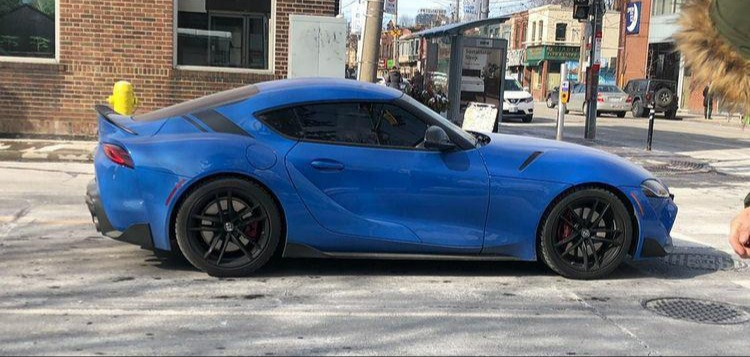
2021 A91 Edition Supra in Refraction Blue

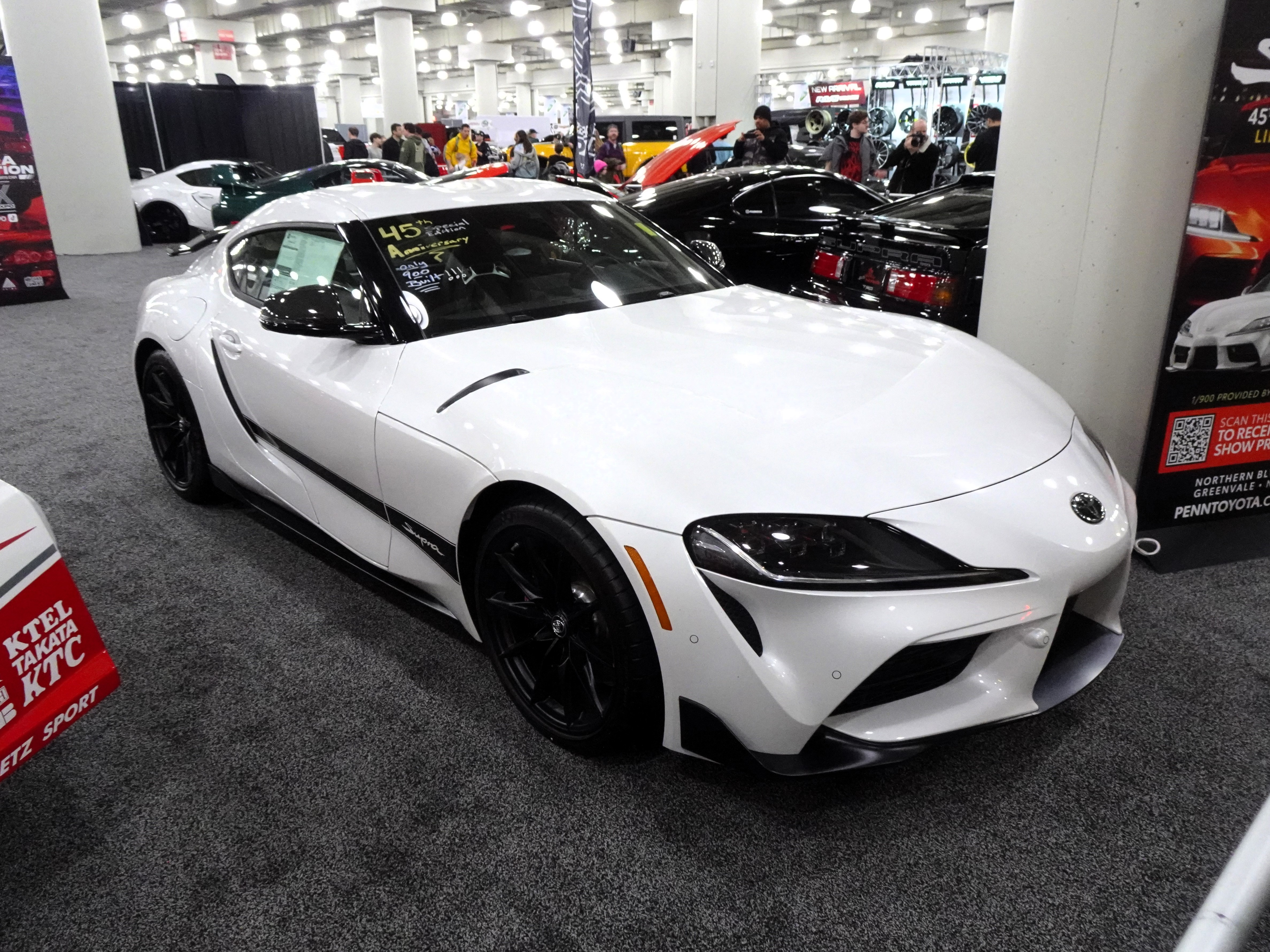
2024 Toyota Supra 45th Anniversary Edition

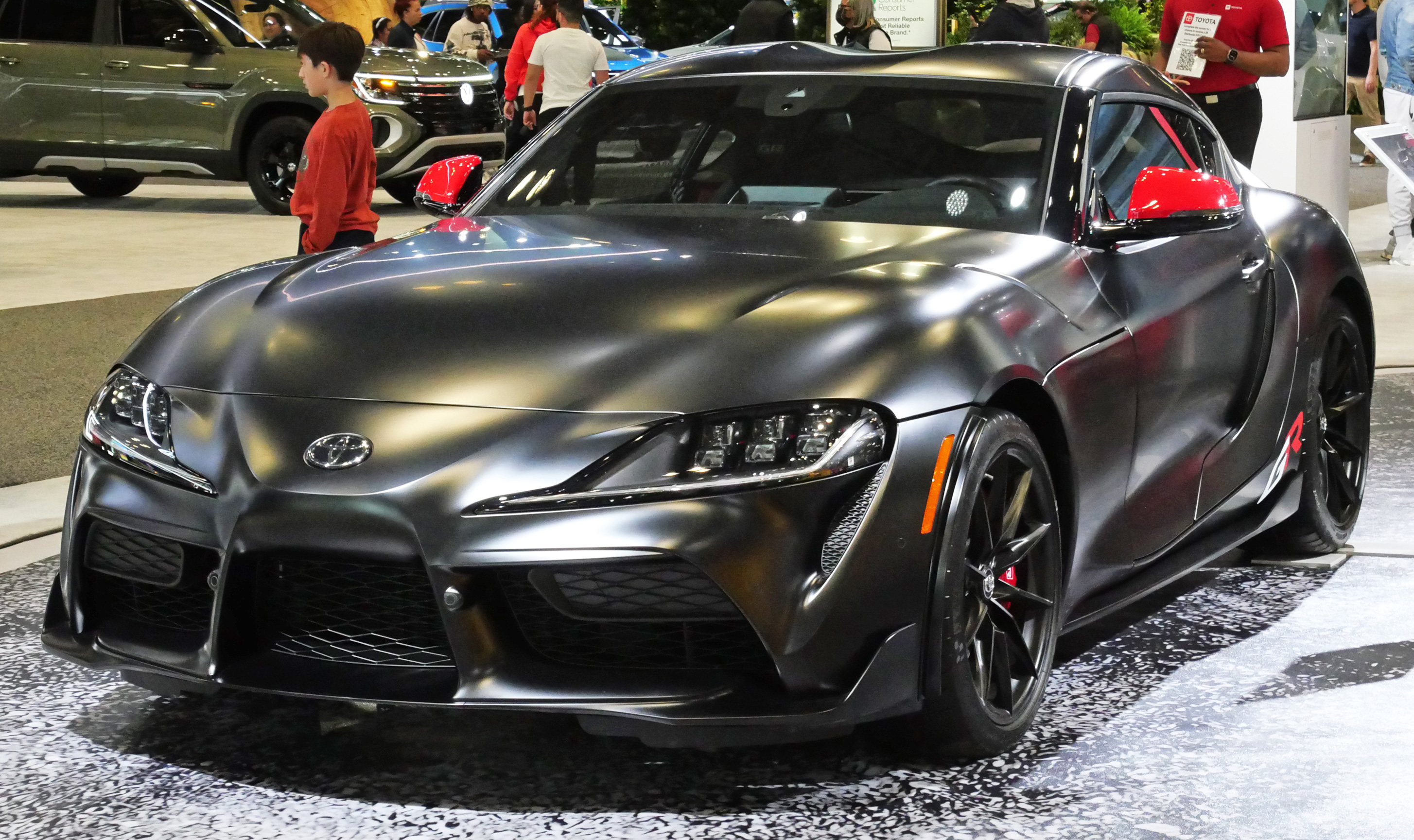
2026 Toyota Supra Final Edition

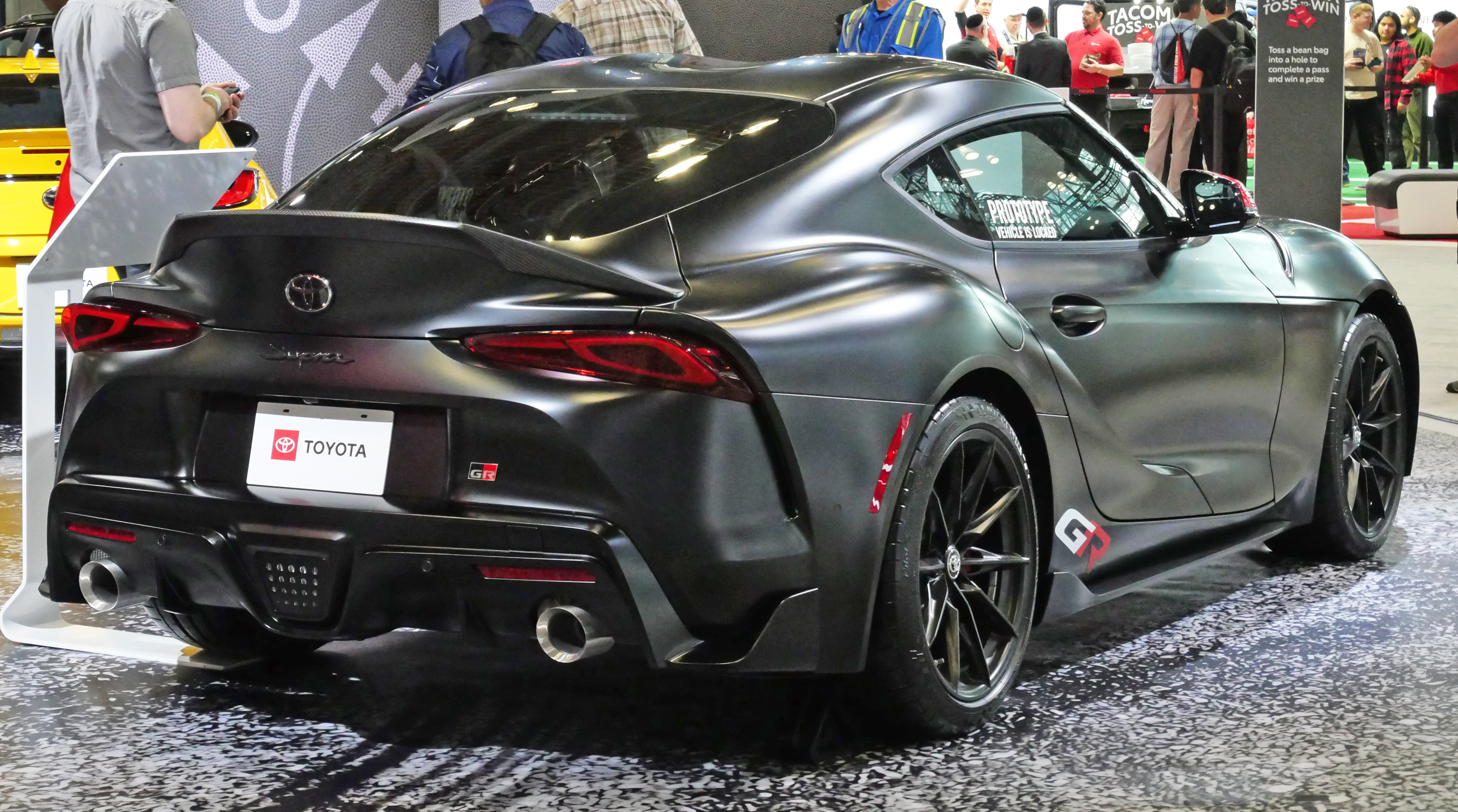
2026 Toyota Supra Final Edition (rear view)

=== United Kingdom ===
The Supra is available in the United Kingdom in 3 variants, 2.0 Pro, 3.0, and 3.0 Pro. The 3.0 and 3.0 Pro are available in both automatic and manual versions from 2022 onwards.

=== Australia ===
The Supra is available in Australia with two variants, including the GT and GTS.

In 2025, the Track Edition was released. It was offered with a 8-speed manual transmission. Sales were stopped in August of the same year.

=== Mexico ===
The Mexican market Supra went on sale in Mexico on 22 August 2019.

=== South Africa ===
The Supra is offered in South Africa in 3 variants, Track, Standard, and Matte Grey Edition variants.

=== South Korea ===
On 9 January 2020, Toyota Korea announced that the GR Supra was being released in South Korea on 21 January 2020.

=== Malaysia ===
The Malaysian market GR Supra was launched on 20 September 2019. In 2023, the GR Supra was launched with two variants, a 3.0-liter six-speed manual and eight-speed automatic.

=== Philippines ===
The Philippine market Supra was launched on 9 July 2019.

=== Taiwan ===
The Taiwanese market Supra is offered in 2.0T, 2.0T Premium and 3.0T Premium trim levels.

=== Indonesia ===
The Indonesian market Supra was introduced at the 27th Gaikindo Indonesia International Auto Show in July 2019 and went on sale in October 2019. The Indonesian market GR Supra is only offered with an 8-speed automatic transmission.

=== Thailand ===
The Thai market Supra was introduced at the Bangkok International Motor Show in March 2019 and went on sale in November 2019.

== Known issues ==
A known issue with the GR Supra is wind buffeting when both side windows are rolled down by any amount. This is caused by Helmholtz resonance at speeds as low as 55 km/h (35 mph) and becomes significantly uncomfortable around 80 km/h (50 mph). Although this issue has not been recalled, it has been acknowledged by Toyota engineers to exist but to not cause enough complaints to warrant any action.

== Recalls ==
On 12 September 2019, the US National Highway Traffic Safety Administration (NHTSA) announced a safety recall issued by BMW on the Supra for the seat belt guide loop mounts, which were welded improperly. Only seven units are affected by this recall notice. Of the seven, only one was in the hands of an owner.

On 27 September, the NHTSA also announced safety recalls towards several BMW models for their faulty backup cameras. Owners were able to glitch the cameras into not working when backing up. A software patch fixed the issue. The Supra was listed in the recall, as well as direct BMW models such as the X3, X5, 3 Series, 7 Series, 8 Series and by proxy, both the Rolls-Royce Phantom and Cullinan, as Rolls-Royce was owned by BMW.

== Model codes ==
While Toyota used the "A90" and "A91" code for promotional and marketing materials for the fifth-generation Supra, a reference to the A40–A80 model and chassis codes used for previous generation Supras, the fifth-generation Supra uses BMW naming conventions. The fifth-generation Supra is a J29 series with DB model codes.

=== Models ===
Series	Model	Years	Driver position	Engine	Power	Torque	Transmission	Primary market
J29	DB81	2020–present	Left	1,998 cc (1.998 L; 121.9 cu in) BMW B48B20 I4 Toyota Designation: B48L	145 kW (194 hp; 197 PS)	320 N⋅m (236 lb⋅ft)	8-speed ZF 8HP automatic	Europe
J29	DB82	2020–present	Right	1,998 cc (1.998 L; 121.9 cu in) BMW B48B20 I4 Toyota Designation: B48L	145 kW (194 hp; 197 PS)	320 N⋅m (236 lb⋅ft)	8-speed ZF 8HP automatic	Europe and Japan
J29	DB22	2020–present	Right	1,998 cc (1.998 L; 121.9 cu in) BMW B48B20 I4 Toyota Designation: B48H	190 kW (255 hp; 258 PS)	400 N⋅m (295 lb⋅ft)	8-speed ZF 8HP automatic	Europe and Japan
J29	DB21	2020–present	Left	1,998 cc (1.998 L; 121.9 cu in) BMW B48B20 I4 Toyota Designation: B48H	190 kW (255 hp; 258 PS)	400 N⋅m (295 lb⋅ft)	8-speed ZF 8HP automatic	Europe and Taiwan
J29	DB23	2020–present	Left	1,998 cc (1.998 L; 121.9 cu in) BMW B46B20 I4 Toyota Designation: B46H	190 kW (255 hp; 258 PS)	400 N⋅m (295 lb⋅ft)	8-speed ZF 8HP automatic	USA and other countries requiring SULEV
J29	DB41	2020–present	Left	2,998 cc (2.998 L; 182.9 cu in) BMW B58B30C I6 Toyota Designation: B58	250 kW (335 hp; 340 PS); 285 kW (382 hp; 387 PS) (some countries)	500 N⋅m (369 lb⋅ft)	8-speed ZF 8HP automatic	Europe, Mexico, Philippines and Taiwan
J29	DB51	2023–present	Left	2,998 cc (2.998 L; 182.9 cu in) BMW B58B30C I6 Toyota Designation: B58	250 kW (335 hp; 340 PS); 285 kW (382 hp; 387 PS) (some countries)	500 N⋅m (369 lb⋅ft)	6-speed ZF GS6L50TZ manual	Europe, Mexico, Philippines and Taiwan
J29	DB52	2023–present	Right	2,998 cc (2.998 L; 182.9 cu in) BMW B58B30C I6 Toyota Designation: B58	250 kW (335 hp; 340 PS); 285 kW (382 hp; 387 PS) (some countries)	500 N⋅m (369 lb⋅ft)	6-speed ZF GS6L50TZ manual	Europe^{2020}, Japan^{2020}, South Africa, Australia, Malaysia, Indonesia and Thailand
J29	DB42	2020–present	Right	2,998 cc (2.998 L; 182.9 cu in) BMW B58B30C I6 Toyota Designation: B58	250 kW (335 hp; 340 PS); 285 kW (382 hp; 387 PS) (some countries)	500 N⋅m (369 lb⋅ft)	8-speed ZF 8HP automatic	Europe^{2020}, Japan^{2020}, South Africa, Australia, Malaysia, Indonesia and Thailand
J29	DB43	2020	Left	2,998 cc (2.998 L; 182.9 cu in) BMW B58B30C I6 Toyota Designation: B58	250 kW (335 hp; 340 PS); 285 kW (382 hp; 387 PS) (some countries)	495 N⋅m (365 lb⋅ft)	8-speed ZF 8HP automatic	USA and Canada
J29	DB03	2021–present	Left	2,998 cc (2.998 L; 182.9 cu in) BMW B58B30O1 I6 Toyota Designation: B58H	285 kW (382 hp; 387 PS)	499 N⋅m (368 lb⋅ft)	8-speed ZF 8HP automatic	USA and Canada
J29	DB02	2021–present	Right	2,998 cc (2.998 L; 182.9 cu in) BMW B58B30O1 I6 Toyota Designation: B58H	285 kW (382 hp; 387 PS)	499 N⋅m (368 lb⋅ft)	8-speed ZF 8HP automatic	Europe and Japan
J29	DB92	2023–present	Right	2,998 cc (2.998 L; 182.9 cu in) BMW B58B30O1 I6 Toyota Designation: B58H	285 kW (382 hp; 387 PS)	499 N⋅m (368 lb⋅ft)	6-speed ZF GS6L50TZ manual	Europe and Japan
J29	DB93	2023–present	Left	2,998 cc (2.998 L; 182.9 cu in) BMW B58B30O1 I6 Toyota Designation: B58H	285 kW (382 hp; 387 PS)	499 N⋅m (368 lb⋅ft)	6-speed ZF GS6L50TZ manual	USA and Canada

== Motorsport ==
=== GR Supra Racing Concept ===
The GR Supra Racing Concept is a concept racing car that previews the racing version of the fifth generation Supra. It debuted at the March 2018 Geneva Motor Show. The design was inspired from the 2014 FT-1 concept. It features a lowered suspension with Toyota OEM parts, BBS centre-lock racing wheels, Brembo racing calipers, a full roll cage and fire extinguisher system, a stripped out interior, Michelin track tyres and a centre exit racing exhaust. It also features carbon fibre for the bonnet, splitter, diffuser, mirror caps, side skirts, wing and bumpers. It is unknown what engine powered the concept.

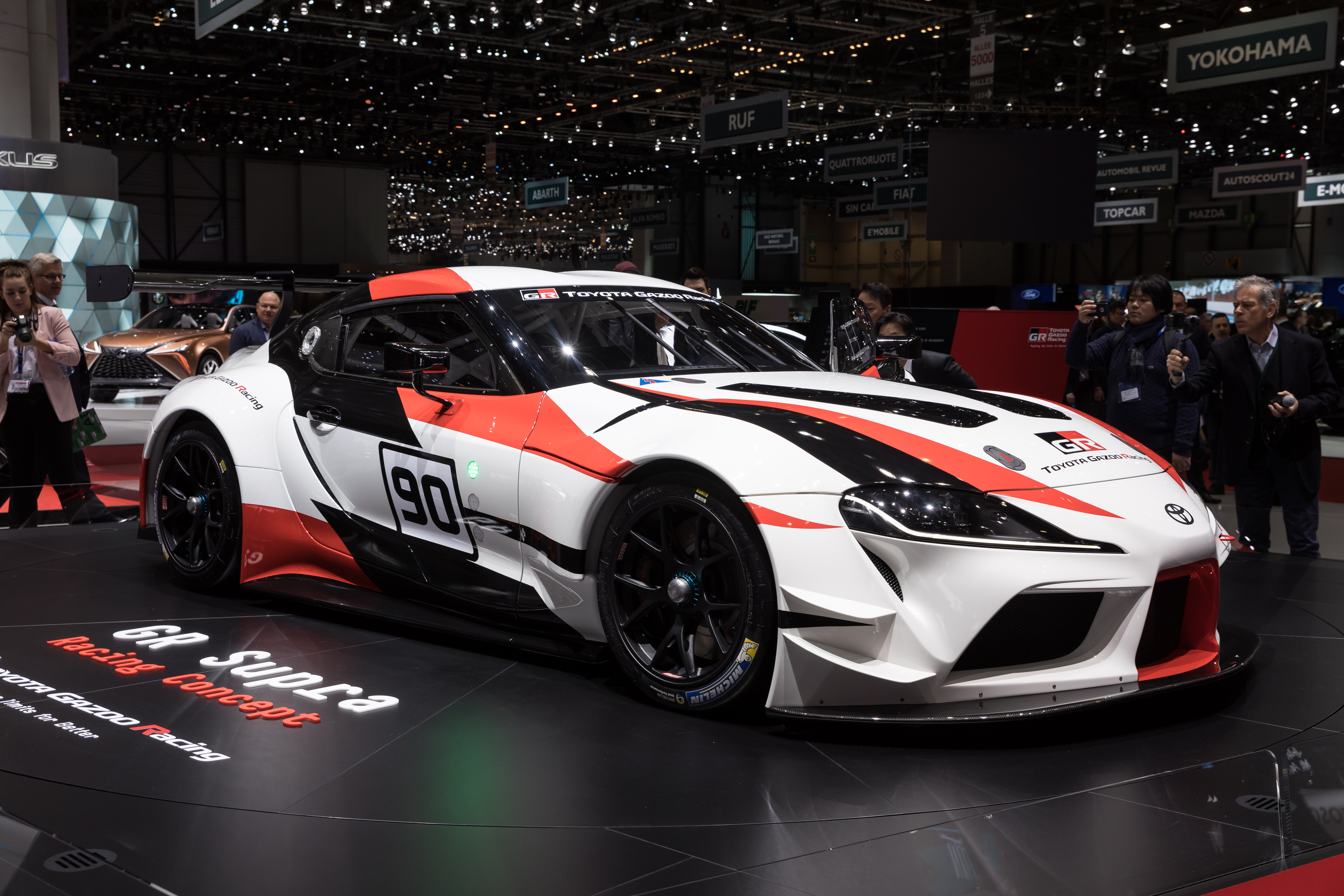
GR Supra Racing Concept at the 2018 Geneva Motor Show

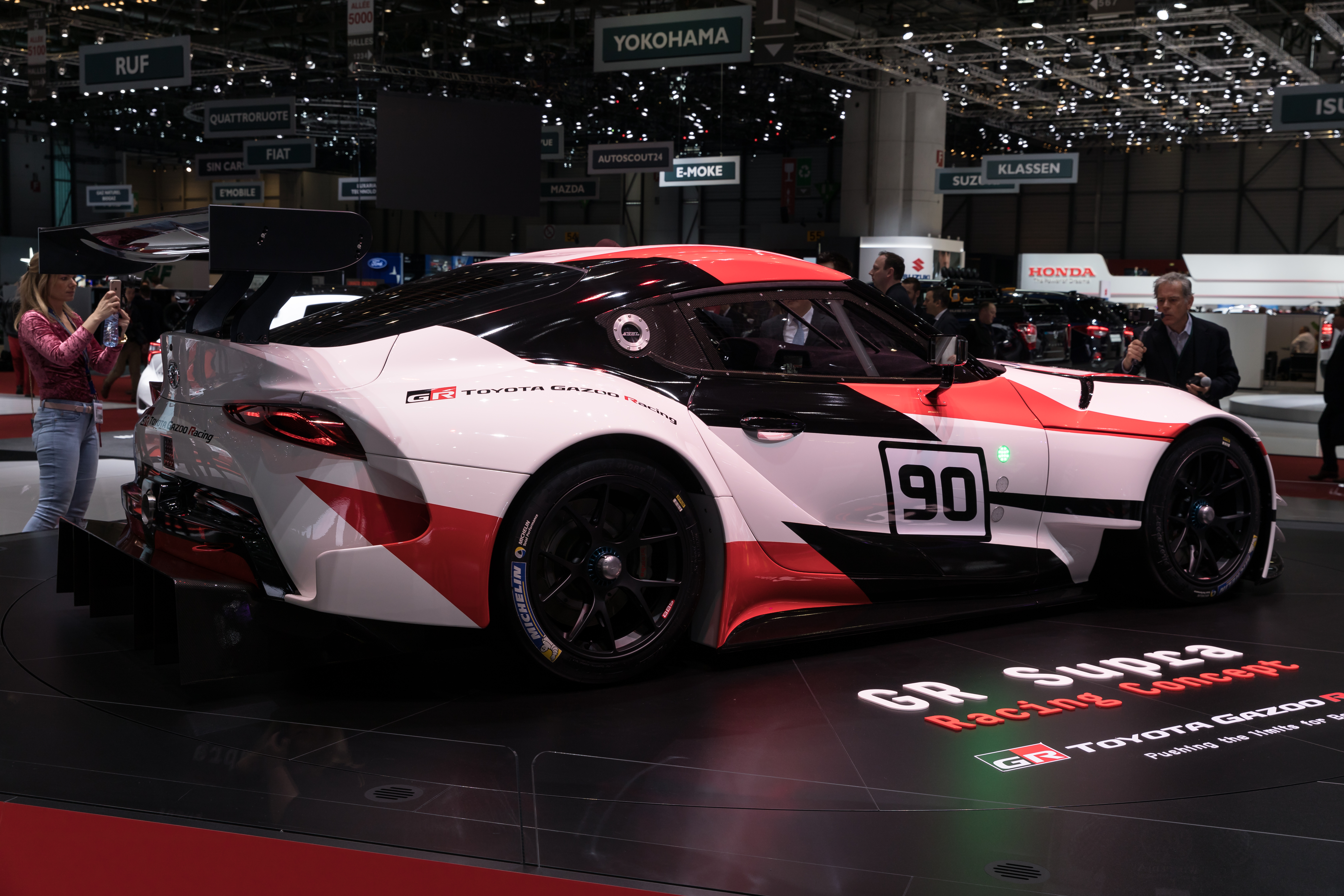
Rear view

=== GR Supra GT4 ===
The GR Supra GT4 Concept is a concept racing car that was built as a racing study model for participating in the European GT4 racing series, as well as other GT4 class races around the world. It was first shown at the March 2019 Geneva Motor Show. Upgrades include reduced weight, upgraded brakes and suspension and the addition of a rear wing and roll cage.

Toyota later unveiled a production model in October 2019, with an engine rated at 320 kW (429 hp; 435 PS). It is primarily designed for customer racing, meaning it is able to be purchased and raced by teams that are not factory-backed. It has a seven-speed automatic, as opposed to the eight-speed unit on standard road going models, and an Akrapovič exhaust system. Inside, an FIA-standard racing seat is present featuring a six-point harness, along with a carbon fibre instrument cluster. A Magneti Marelli engine management system, motorsport ABS, data logger and fire extinguisher are standard, while an illuminated car number is optional. The GT4 is equipped with Brembo six-piston front and four-piston rear brake calipers and KW dampers. The GT4 is fitted with Pirelli P Zero racing tyres and OZ wheels. The roll cage and rear wing are also carried over from the concept. Sales began in Europe in March 2020, followed by North America in August 2020 and Japan/Southeast Asia in October 2020.

Toyota released the updated GR Supra GT4 in October 2022, named the GR Supra GT4 EVO, with upgrades focused on engine performance, handling, and braking. The engine has been updated with increased power, an updated torque curve with maximum torque of up to 660 N⋅m (487 lb⋅ft), and improved cooling. Additionally, the brake system design has been improved, new ABS settings have been added, and the KW dampers and anti-roll bar specification have been updated for higher cornering speeds and improved handling. Owners of the previous GT4 will have the option to upgrade to the new GT4 EVO specification, if desired. The GT4 EVO will make its debut at the 2023 24 Hours of Daytona. Sales began October 2022 internationally, at a price of €186,000.

As of 2022, more than 50 GR Supra GT4 cars have been used in GT4 class races. They have earned victories in 11 national and international GT4 championships, and over 100 podium finishes. In August 2022, the GR Supra GT4 earned its 50th class win in a major championship, at the GT World Challenge Asia at Sportsland Sugo in Japan.

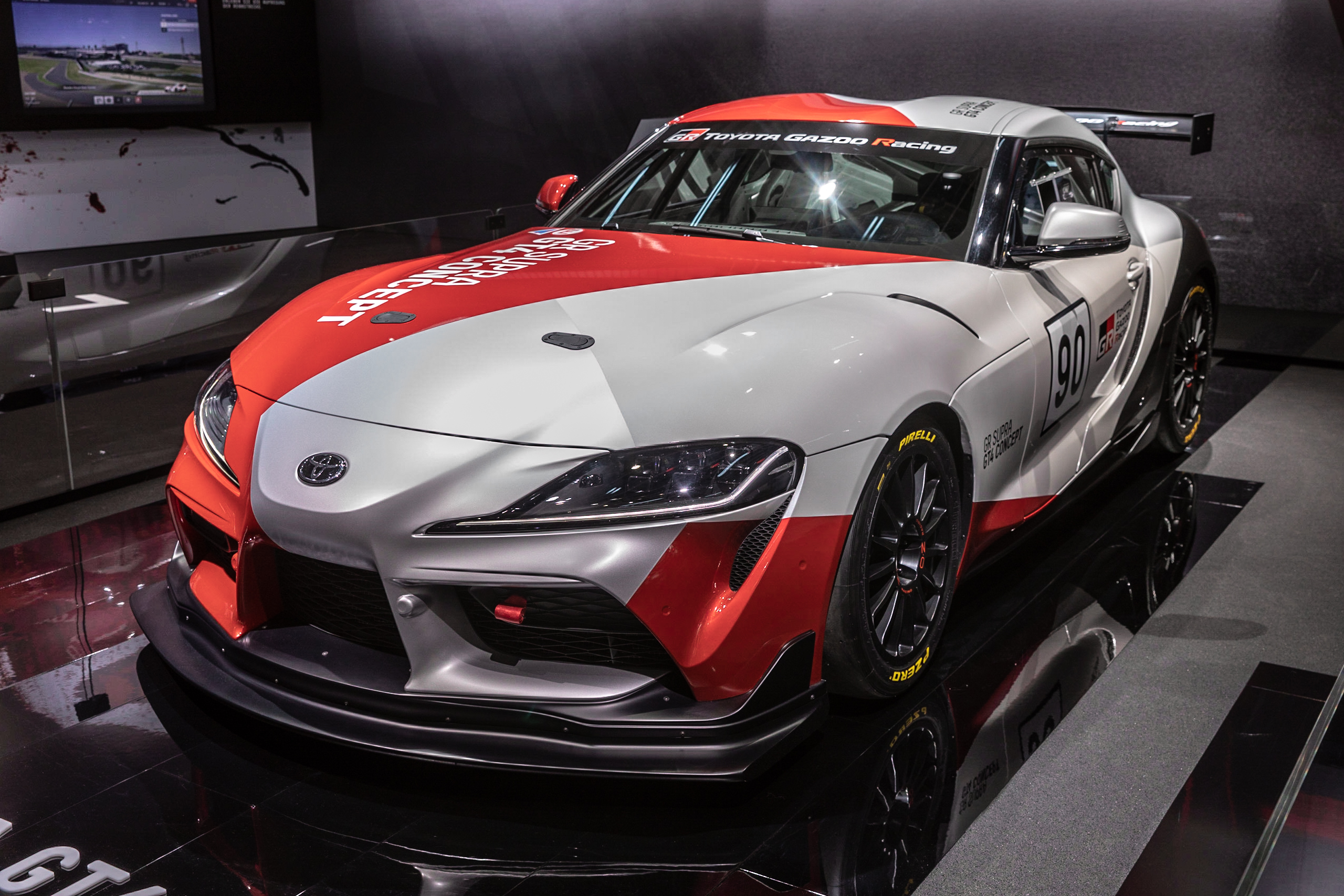
Toyota GR Supra GT4

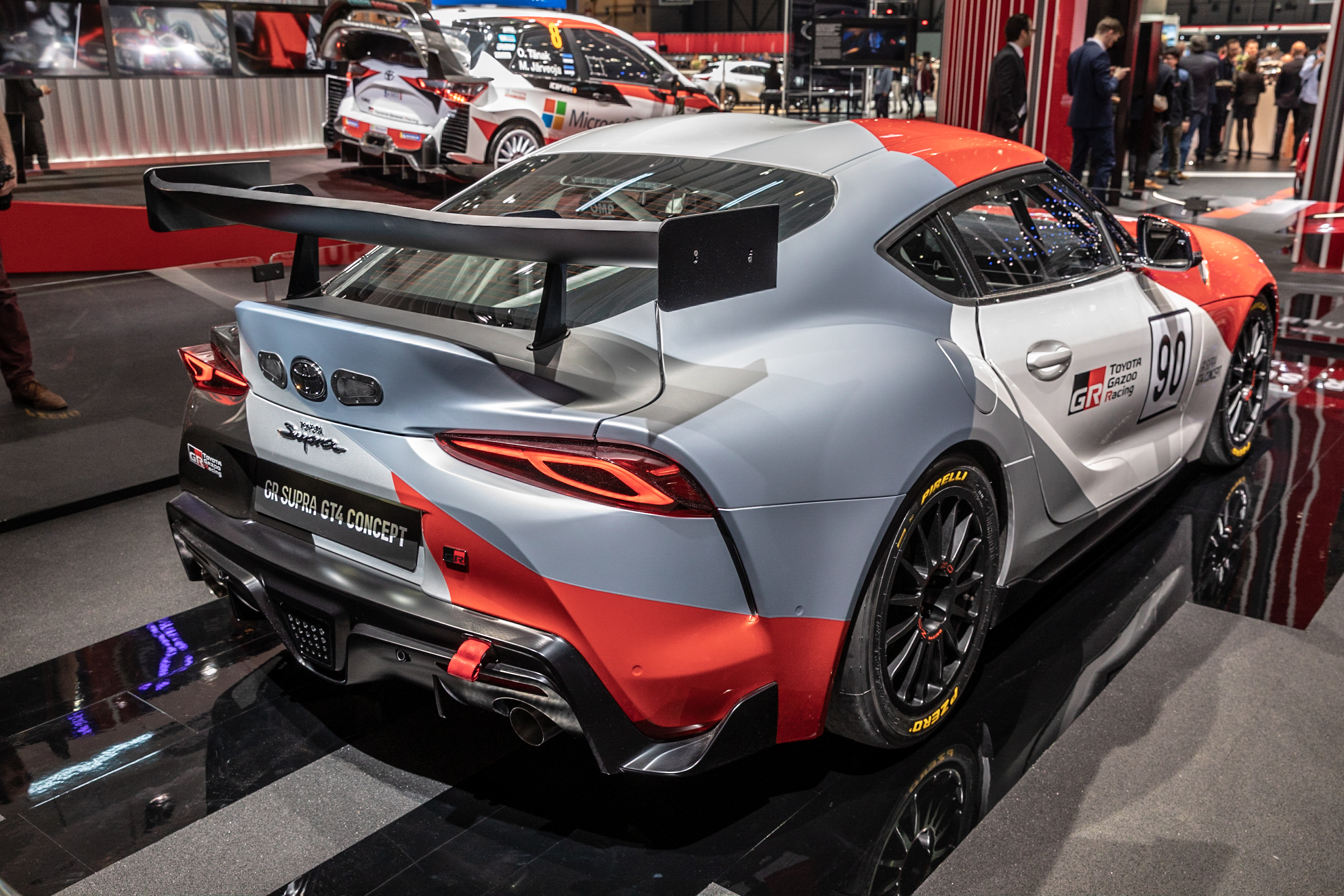
Rear view

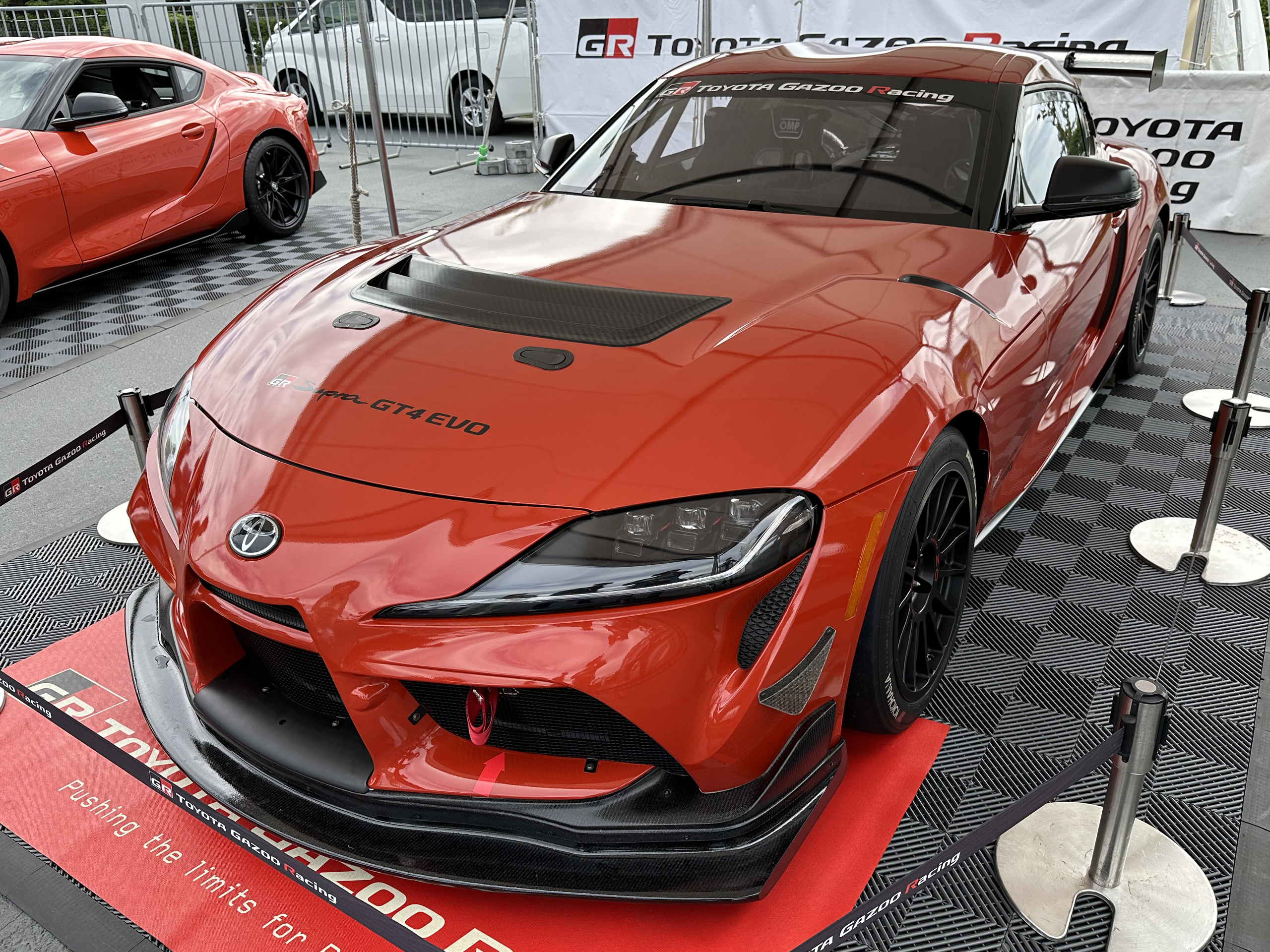
Toyota GR Supra GT4 EVO

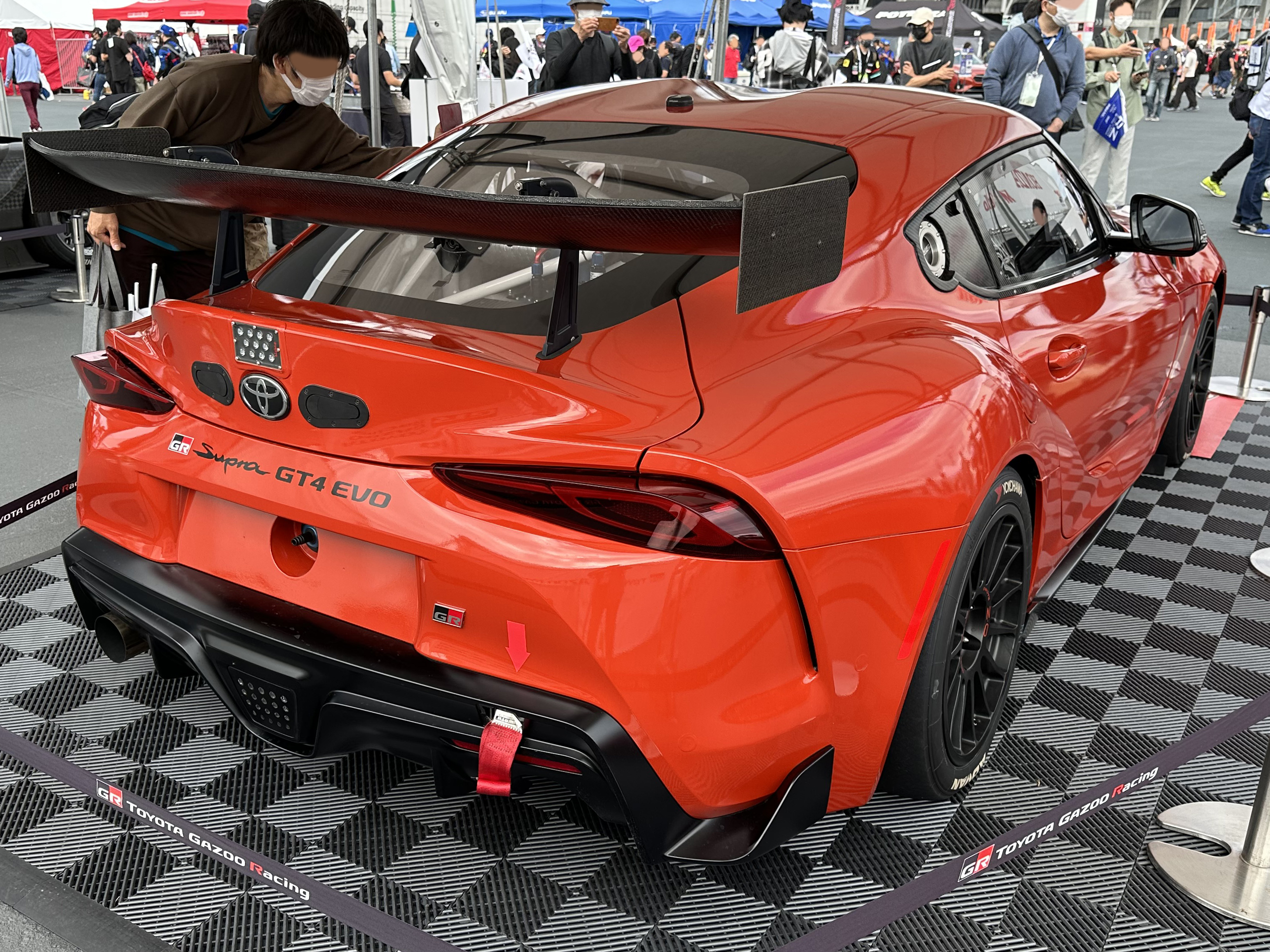
Rear view

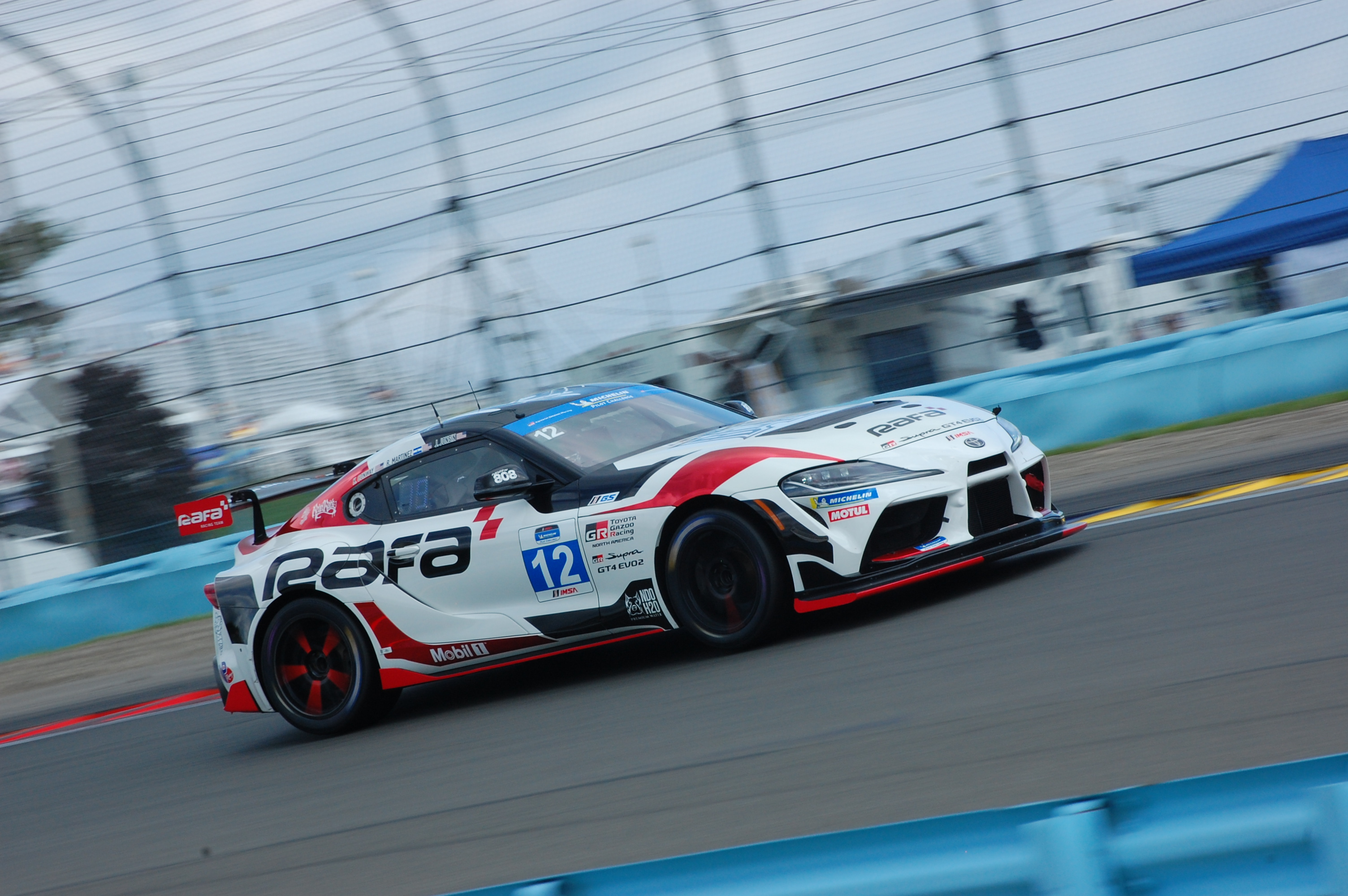
The GR Supra GT4 Evo2 of RAFA Racing Team during the 2025 LP Building Solutions 120 at Watkins Glen International.

=== Super GT ===
Toyota announced the use of the Toyota Supra in the Japanese Super GT racing series from 2020 onward for Toyota Gazoo Racing. As of 2025, the GR Supra GT500 has won 24 races and 4 championships, and the GR Supra GT300 has won 8 races and 1 championship in their first 5 seasons in the Super GT Championship.

The GR Supra GT500 is used for the top class in the championship racing series, the GT500 class, alongside the GR Supra GT300 in the GT300 class. It has been used from the 2020 racing series onward for Toyota Gazoo Racing, replacing the Lexus LC500 GT500 and Toyota 86 MC (GT300). The GR Supra GT500 features a 500 kW (670 hp) 2.0-litre Toyota RI4A turbo four-cylinder engine, while the GR Supra GT300 features the 5.4-litre 2UR-GSE V8 engine according to JAF-GT GT300 regulations.

In the 2021 Super GT Series, the Toyota GR Supra GT500 raced by TGR Team au TOM'S won the 2021 championship in the GT500 class, driven by Yuhi Sekiguchi and Sho Tsuboi. The team overcame a 16-point deficit in the final round of the season to win the championship.

The 2023 Super GT Series resulted in championship victories for the Toyota GR Supra in both classes. The GR Supra GT500 raced by TGR Team au TOM'S won the championship in the GT500 class, driven by Sho Tsuboi and Ritomo Miyata, while the GR Supra GT300 raced by Saitama Green Brave won the championship in the GT300 class, driven by Hiroki Yoshida and Kohta Kawaai.

TGR Team au TOM'S continued to win the championship in the GT500 class for two more consecutive years, in 2024 and 2025, with drivers Sho Tsuboi and Kenta Yamashita both years.

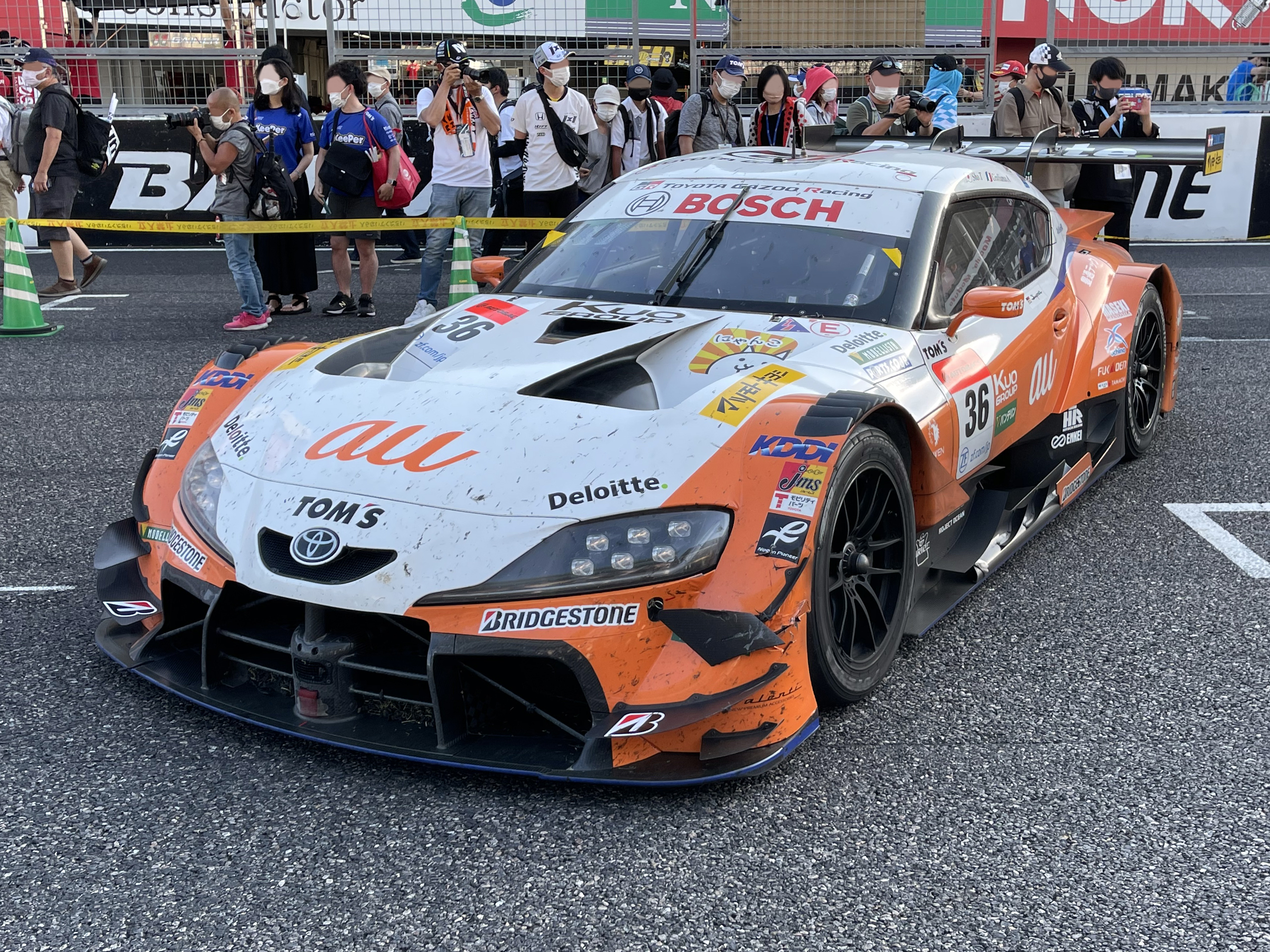
TGR Team au Tom's GR Supra GT500

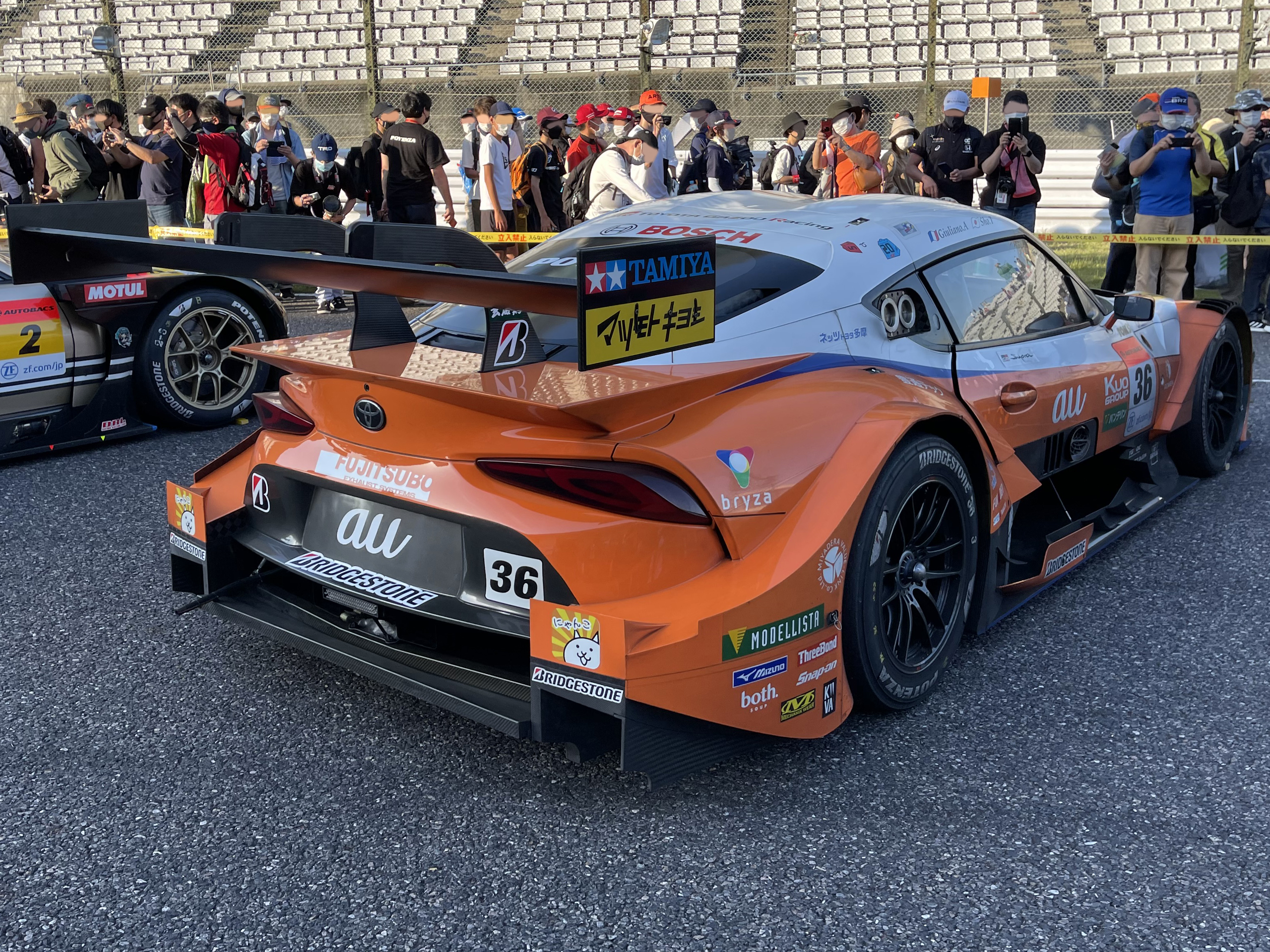
Rear view

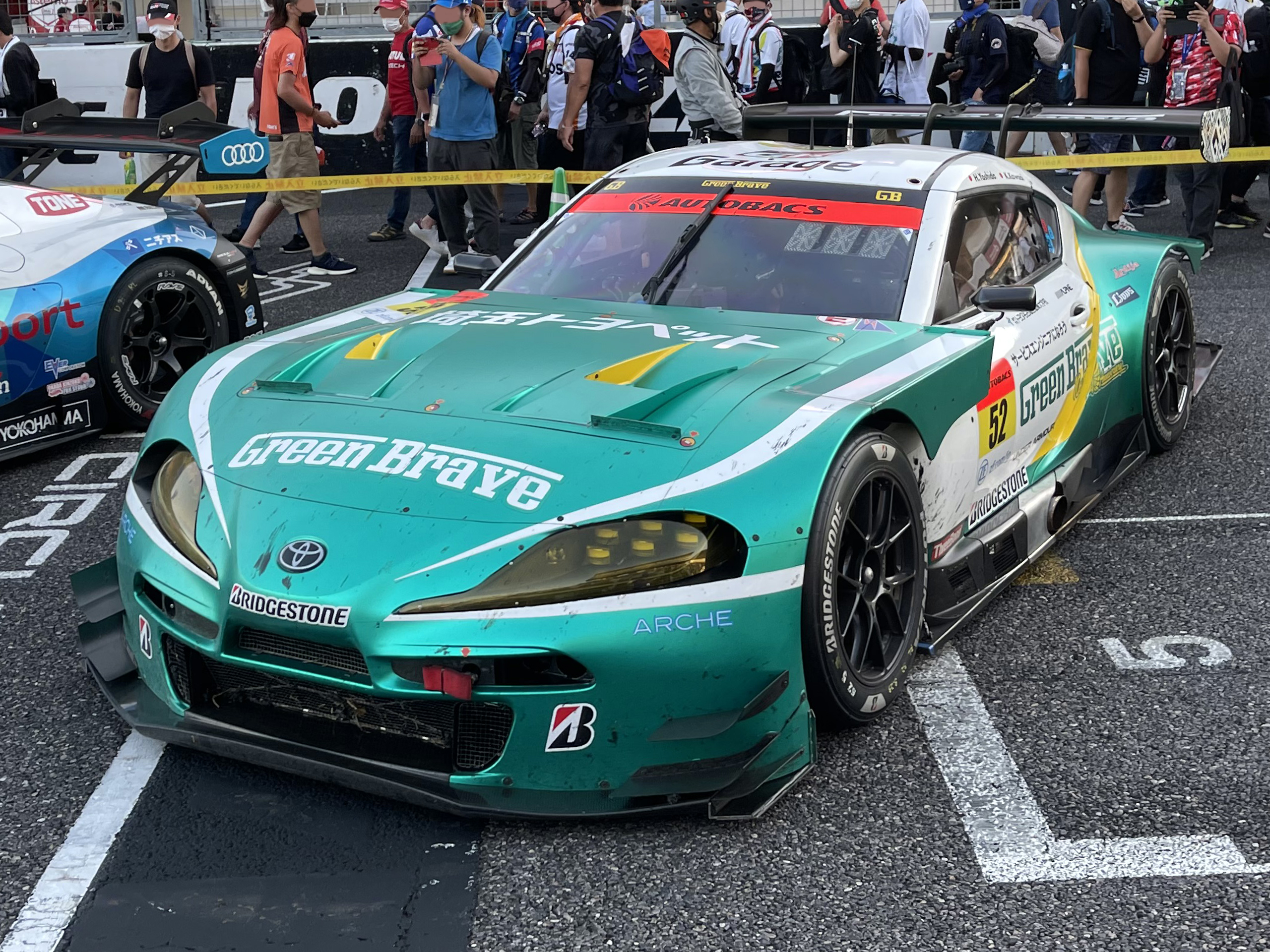
Saitama Toyopet GreenBrave GR Supra GT300

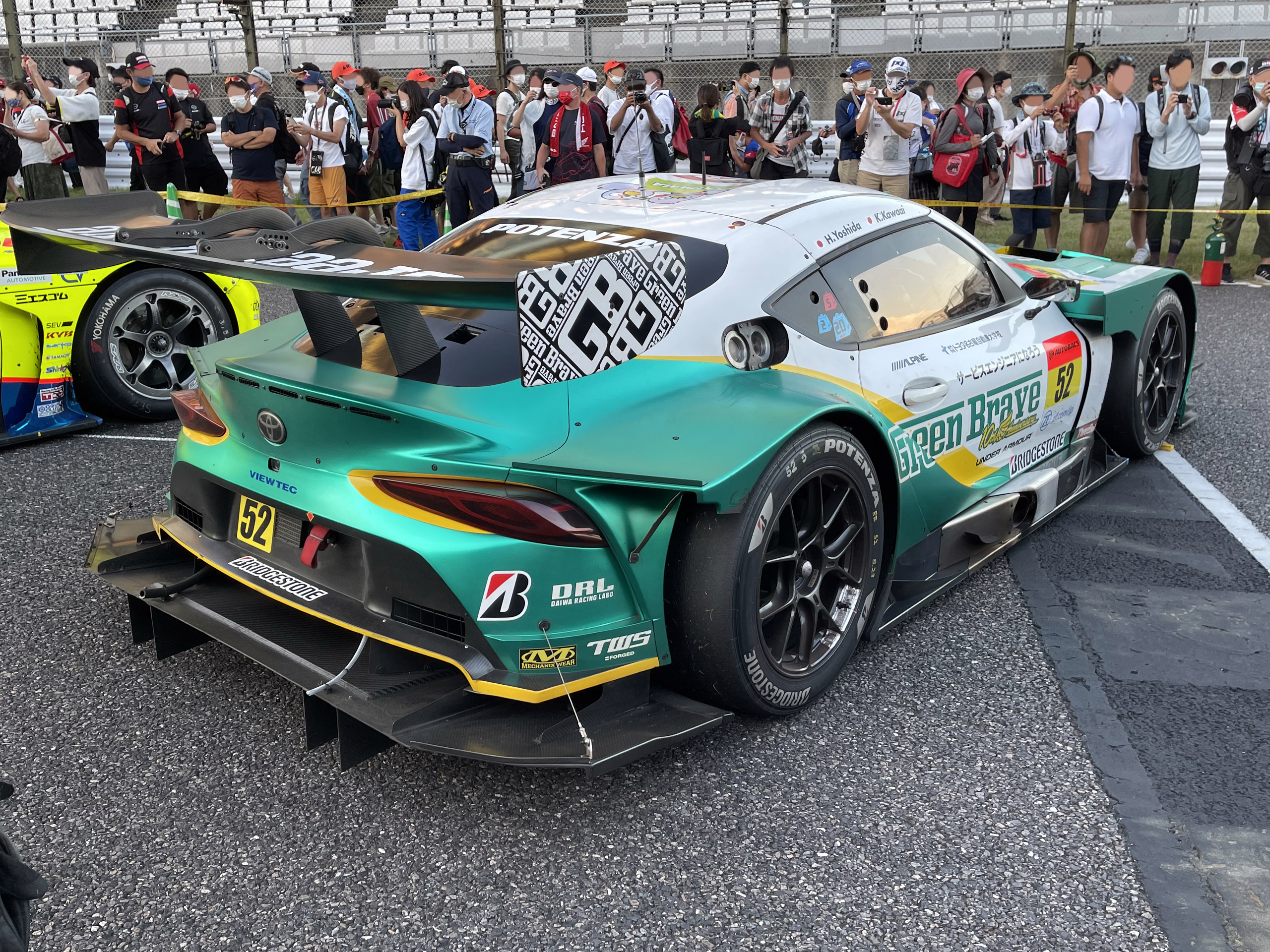
Rear view

=== NASCAR ===
On 5 July 2018, Toyota Gazoo Racing announced that the Supra will race in the 2019 NASCAR Xfinity Series. The new Supra made its NASCAR debut in February 2019.

On February 23, Christopher Bell of Joe Gibbs Racing scored the Supra's first NASCAR win at Atlanta. The Supra has since won six out of the first 11 races of the 2019 season, including three from part-time driver Kyle Busch.

At the end of the 2021 season, Daniel Hemric drove his Supra to his first win at Phoenix to claim the championship.

In the 2022 NASCAR Xfinity Series, Ty Gibbs drove his Supra to 7 wins, claiming his first series championship.

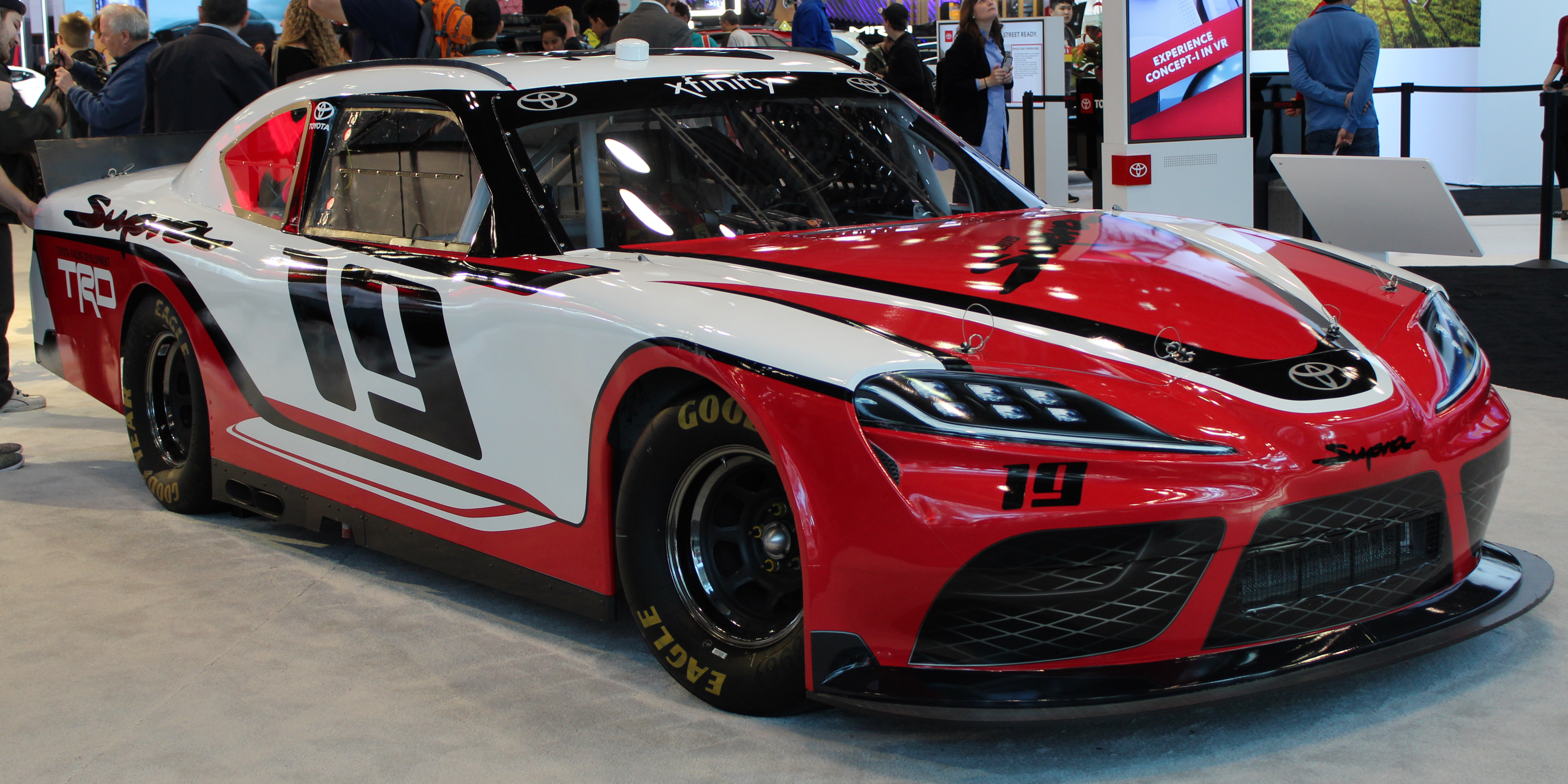
Toyota Supra NASCAR Xfinity Series stock car

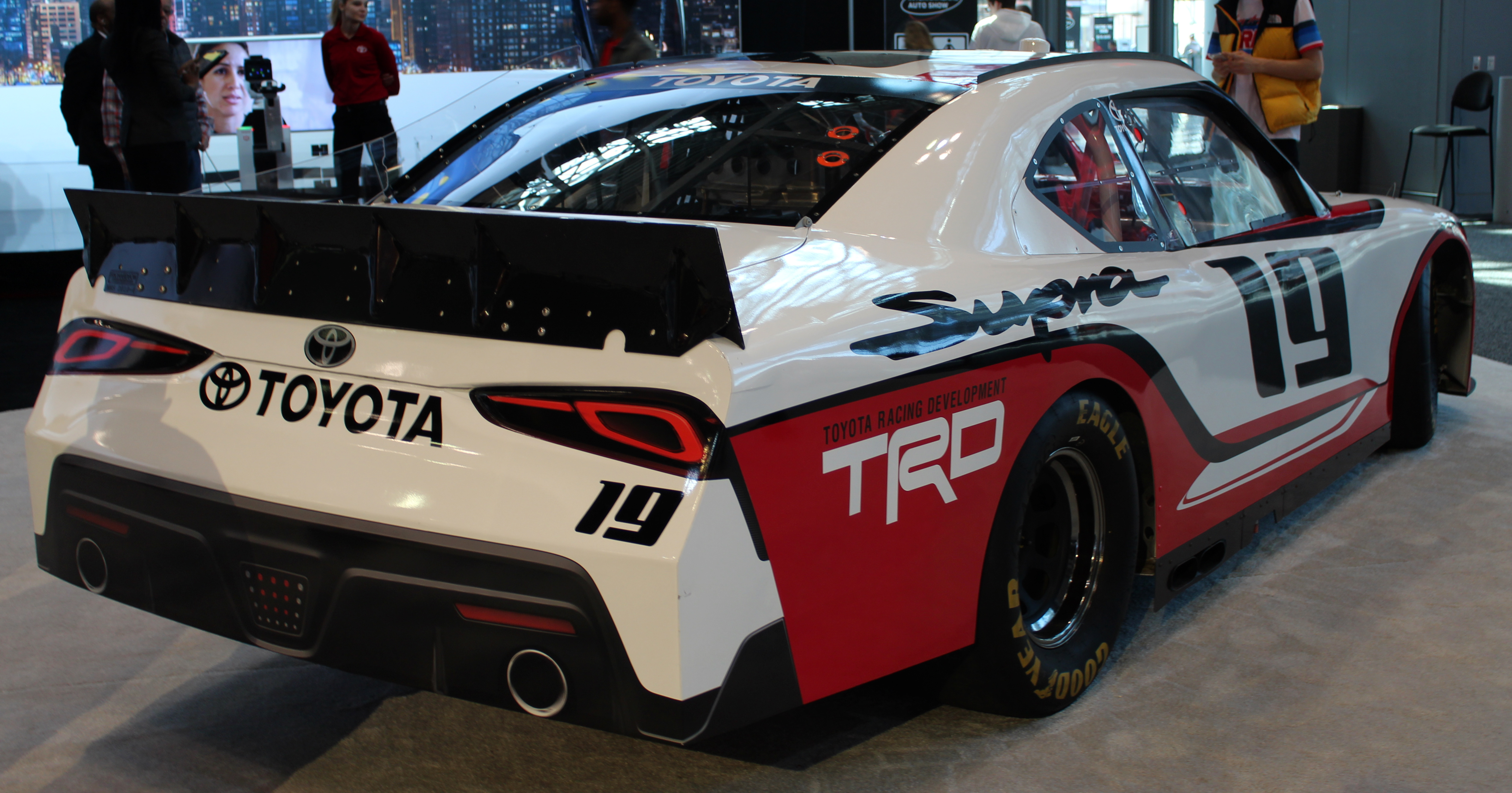
Rear view

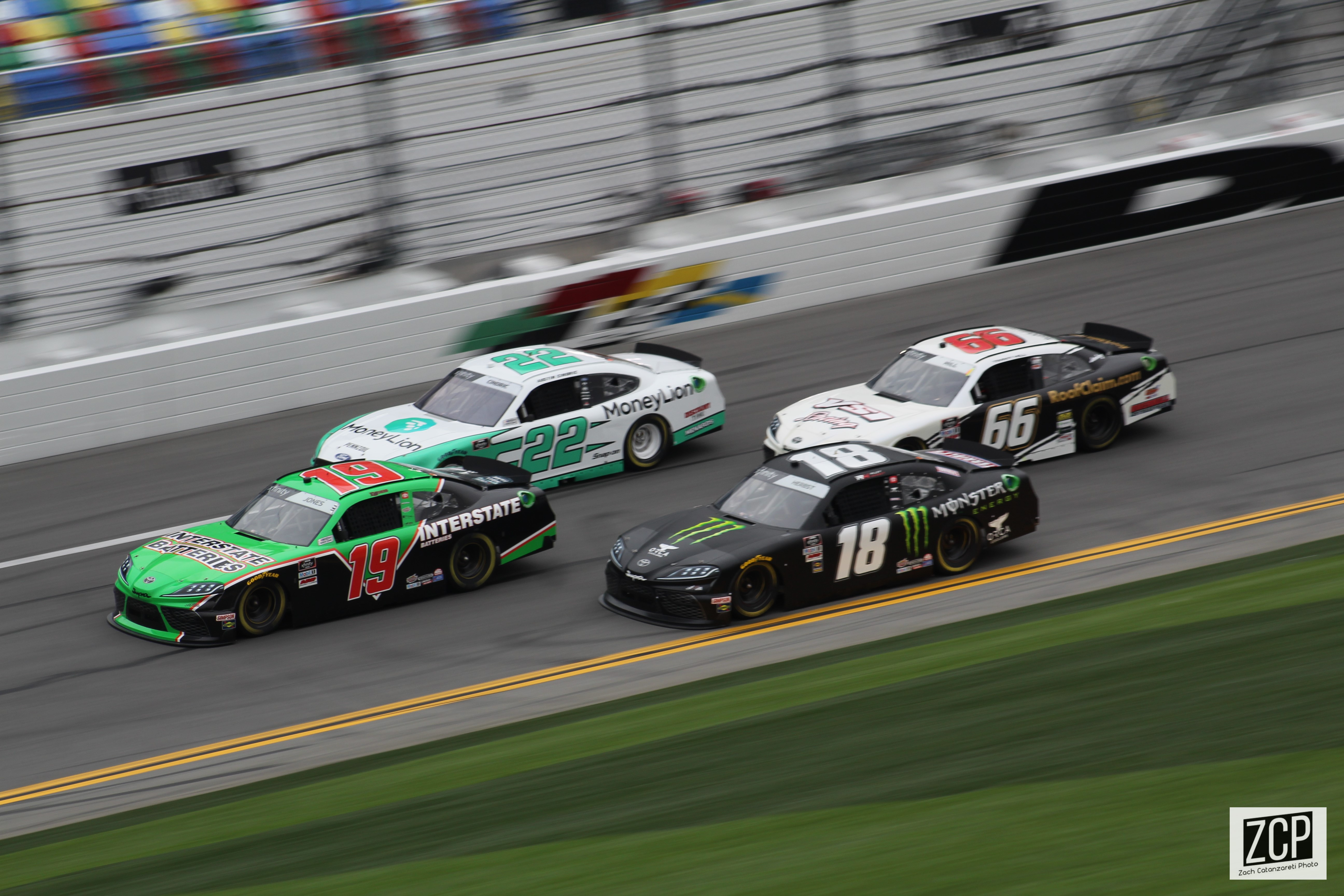
Multiple Supra stock cars racing at Daytona Speedweeks 2020

=== D1 Grand Prix ===
On 13 March 2019, Toyota Gazoo Racing announced that it would be sponsoring the first fifth-generation GR Supra in the D1 Grand Prix production car drifting series, raced by Daigo Saito and Team Fat Five Racing (later rebranded as TMAR) for the 2019 season onwards. Team Toyo Tires also announced that they will be joining in using the GR Supra, driven by Masato Kawabata, from 2019 onwards. Other teams such as Team Yokohama Toyopet, Car Guy Racing, and SPAN Racing also later elected to use the GR Supra platform for their race teams.

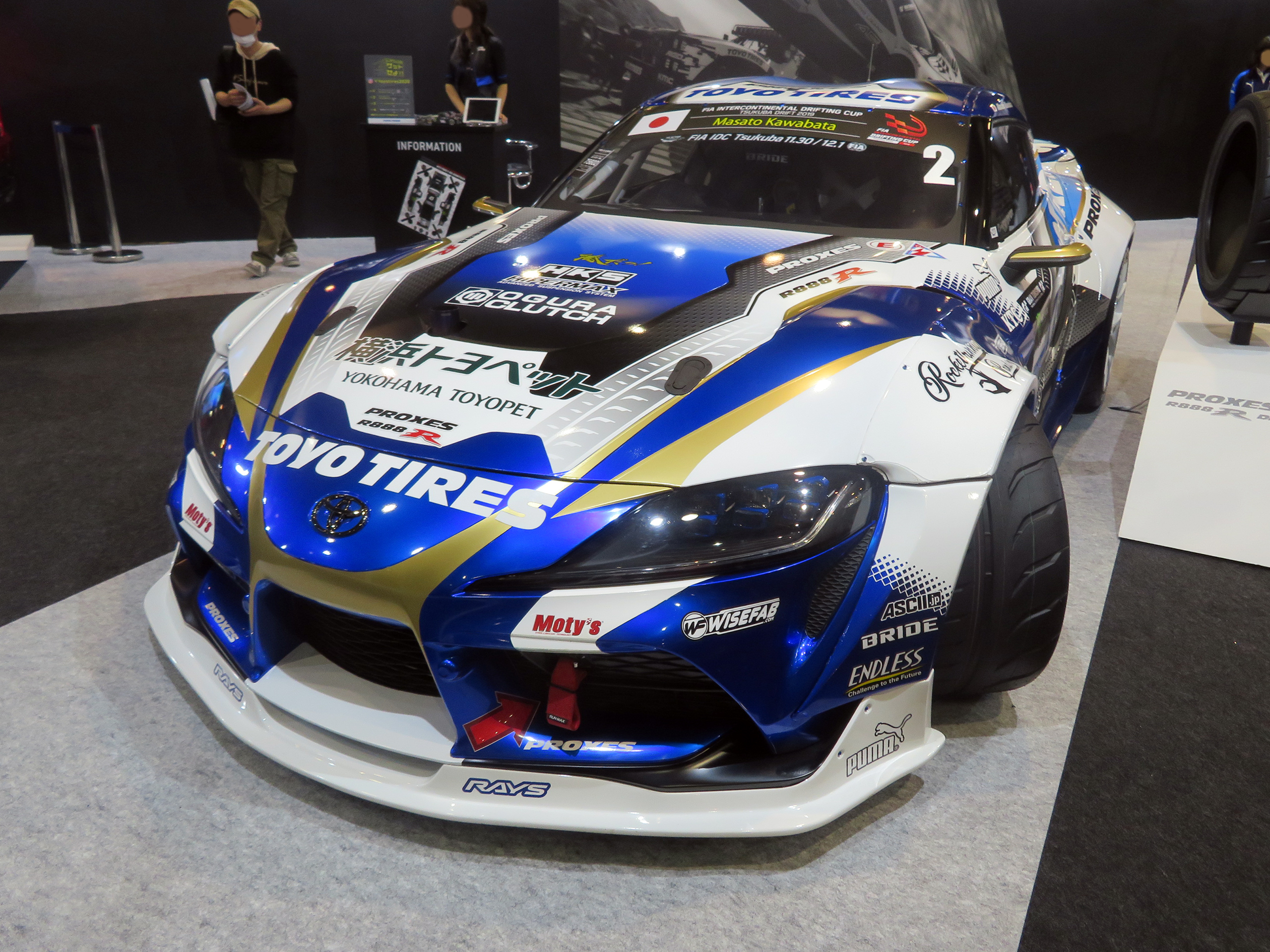
Team Toyo Tires Toyota GR Supra D1 Grand Prix drift car

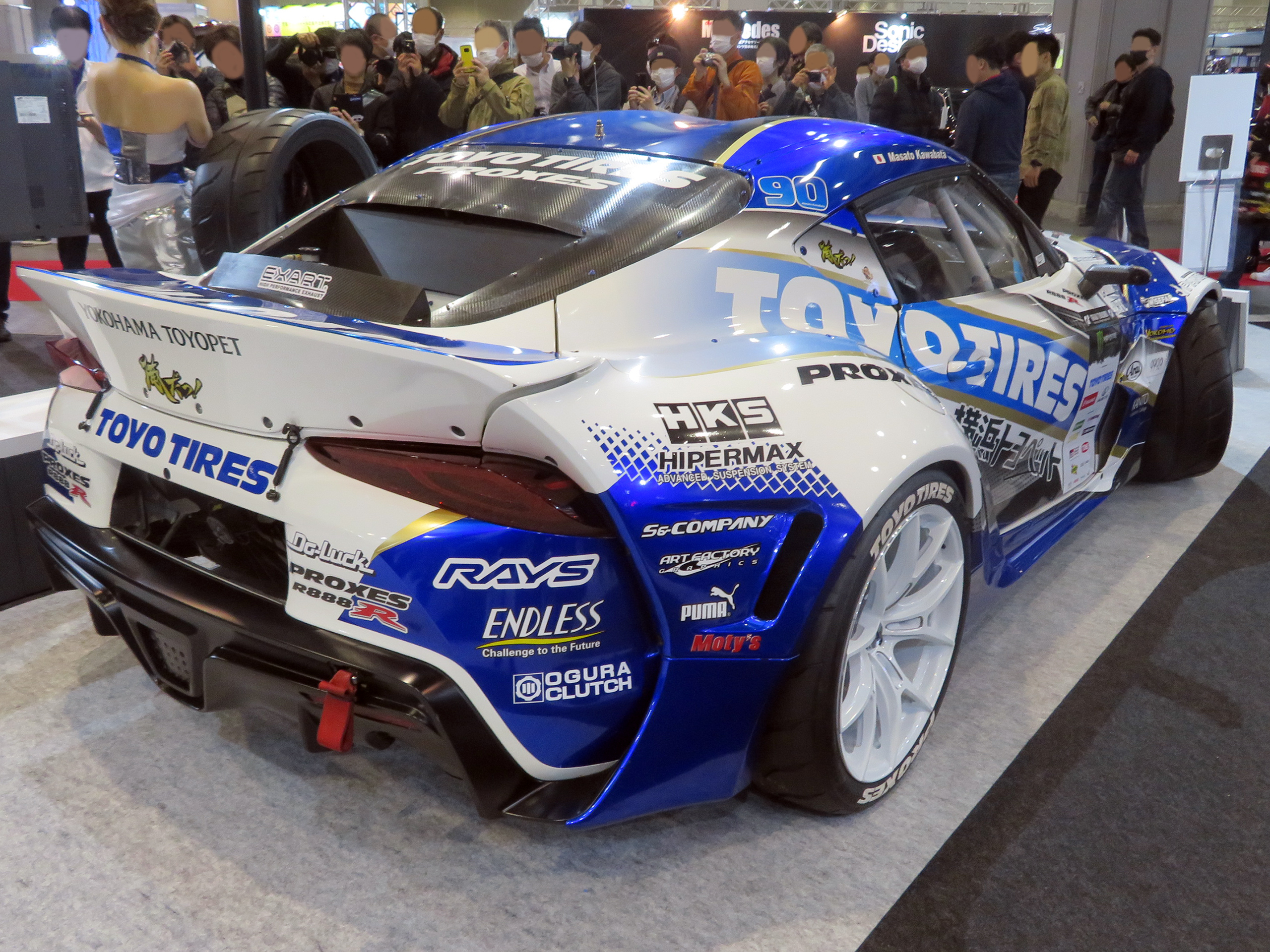
Rear view

=== Formula Drift ===
In March 2020, the first GR Supra for the Formula Drift drifting series was unveiled by Papadakis Racing in partnership with Toyota Gazoo Racing. It is powered by a modified B58 engine producing over 745 kW (1,000 hp) and is driven by Fredric Aasbø. In November 2020, another GR Supra for Formula D was unveiled by GReddy Performance, powered by a modified B58 powerplant producing 596 kW (800 hp), and driven by Ken Gushi. Both Formula D GR Supras were featured by Toyota at the 2020 SEMA show, and have competed in Formula D since 2020. Team Huragan Racing's Oleksii Holovnia also began piloting a GR Supra in 2023.

Aasbø went on to win the 2021 and 2022 Formula D Championship driving the GR Supra, winning five individual rounds since 2020. Strong performances by the GR Supra in Formula D have also helped Toyota win the overall Formula D Auto Cup in both 2021 and 2022.

=== Supercars Championship ===
In September 2024, Toyota Gazoo Racing Australia confirmed the use of the GR Supra in the Supercars Championship from 2026. Walkinshaw TWG Racing were announced as the homologation team, as well as the use of the 2UR-GSE 5.0-litre V8 engine used in the Lexus RC F GT3.

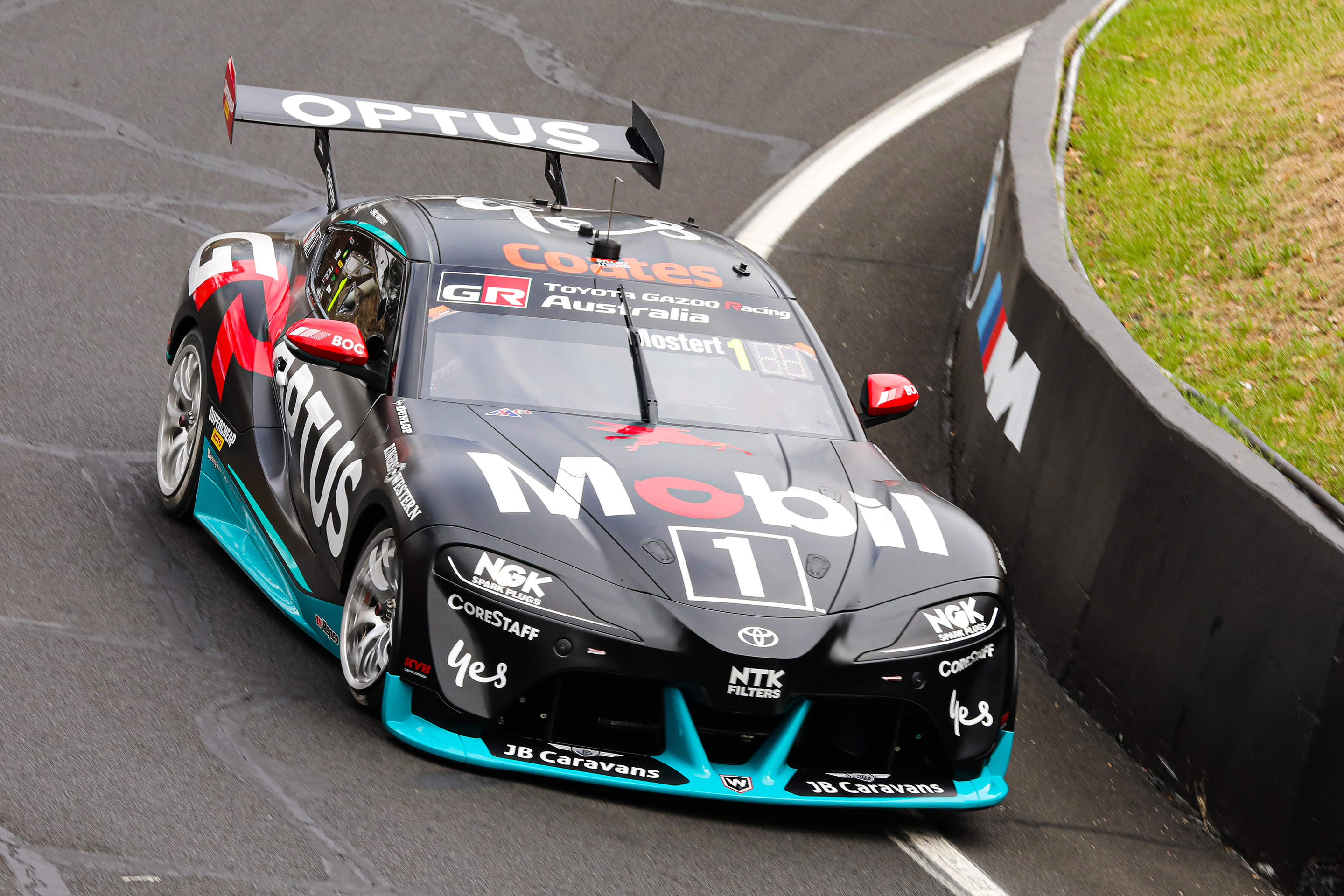
Walkinshaw TWG Racing GR Supra Supercar

== Awards ==
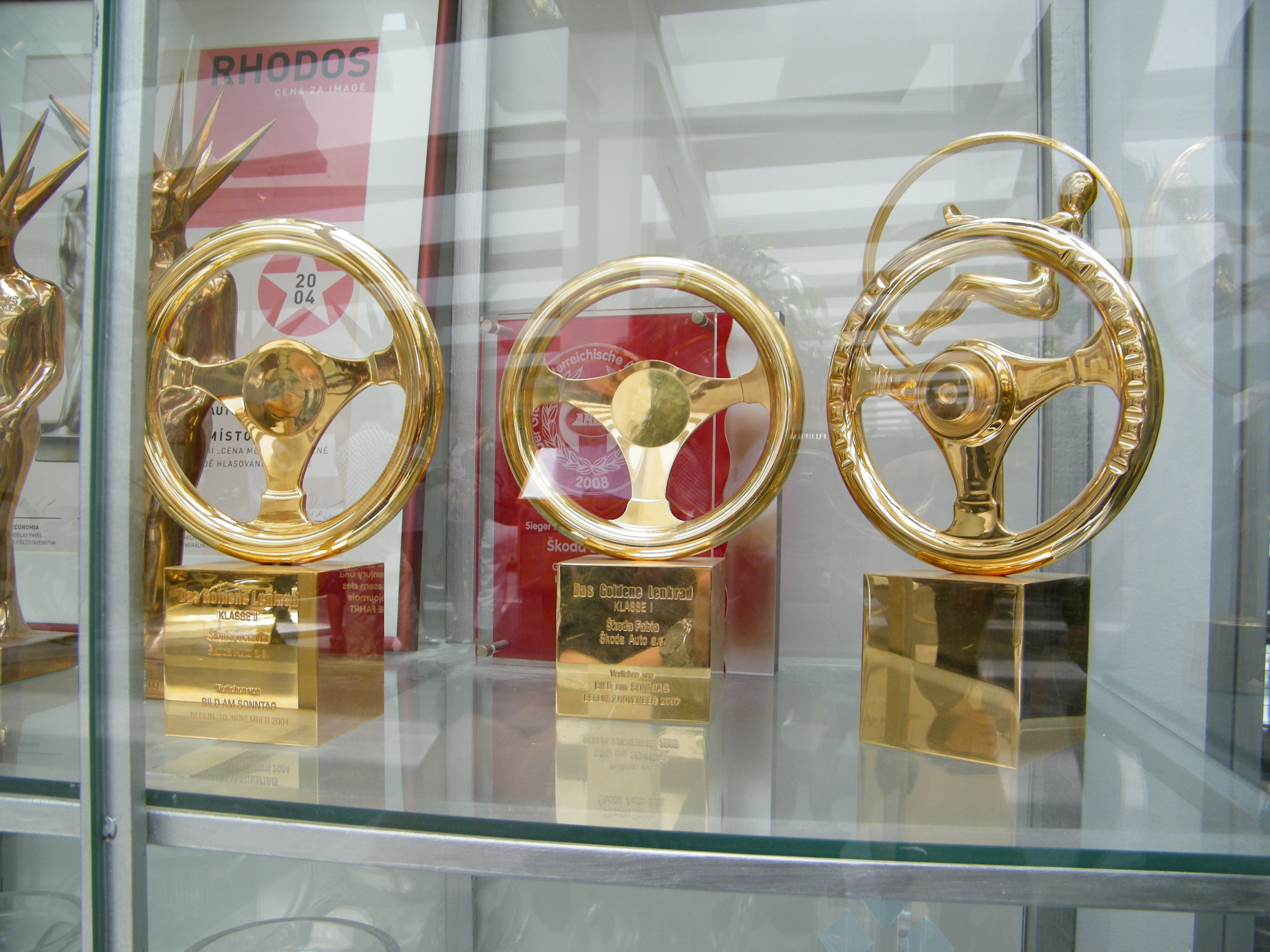
The fifth-generation Supra won the Golden Steering Wheel award in 2019

- Won the "Golden Steering Wheel" award by Auto Bild magazine in 2019 for Best New Sports Car.
- 2019 "Car of the Year" by Esquire magazine.
- Won "Best Handling Car" of 2020 by Sport Auto magazine, over such competition as the McLaren 600 LT, Porsche 718 Cayman GT4, and BMW M8 Competition.
- Won "Best Sports Coupe" in MotorWeek magazine's 2020 Drivers' Choice Awards.
- Selected to be on Car and Driver magazine's 10Best list for 2020.
- Automobile magazine's 2020 Automobile All-Stars winner.
- 2020 Automotive News PACE Award given to Magna for the weight-saving innovation of the composite space frame liftgate reinforcement on the 2020 Toyota Supra.
- Awarded Car and Driver magazine's "Editor's Choice" award for 2020 in the Sports Car category.
- Motor Trend magazine's 2020 "Car of the Year" finalist.
- 2020 North American Car of the Year finalist.
- On Car and Driver magazine's 10Best list for 2021, for a second consecutive year.
- The Specialty Equipment Market Association (SEMA) awarded the fifth-generation Supra as the "Sport Compact of the Year" for 2021.
- Won "Best Sports Coupe" in MotorWeek magazine's 2021 Drivers' Choice Awards, for a second consecutive year.
- Awarded Car and Driver magazine's "Editor's Choice" award for 2021 in the Sports Car category.
- The Texas Auto Writer's Association named it the "Performance Vehicle of Texas" for 2021.
- 2021 "Performance Coupe" category award from the Texas Auto Writer's Association.
- Awarded Car and Driver magazine's "Editor's Choice" award for 2022 in the Sports Car category.
- On Forbes magazine's "Best Sports Cars" list for 2022.
- Won "Best Japanese Sports Car" for 2022 by HotCars.
- Won the 2023 ALG Residual Value Award by J.D. Power.
- On Car and Driver magazine's 10Best list for 2023, for the third time.
- Awarded Car and Driver magazine's "Editor's Choice" award for 2023 in the Sports Car category, for a fourth consecutive year.
- Won the 2023 "Miles of Smiles" Award from Autocar.
- Won the 2024 ALG Residual Value Award by J.D. Power, for a second consecutive year.

== Sales ==
Year	United States	Europe (Note: Toyota Motor Europe: Europe including Russia and Turkey + Armenia, Georgia, Azerbaijan, Kazakhstan and Israel)
2019	2,884	
2020	5,887	
2021	6,830	979
2022	4,952	830
2023	2,652	939
2024	2,615	442
2025	2,953	204

== See also ==
- List of Toyota vehicles
