= 2023 Formula Drift season =

Motorsport season

The 2023 Formula Drift season (officially titled and stylized as the Formula DRIFT PRO Championship) was the twentieth season of the Formula D series. The season began on April 8 at Long Beach and concluded on October 14 at Irwindale Speedway after eight events.

To coincide with its twentieth anniversary celebrations, the series announced a number of additions to be made throughout the year. These include the inauguration of a Formula Drift Hall of Fame, the unveiling of a monument to the series in downtown Long Beach, increased prize money for event winners and the series champion, and the launch of an officially sanctioned podcast.

== Entries ==
Team	No.	Car	Tires	Driver	Round(s)
Alec Robbins Racing	35	Nissan 350Z	Kenda	(United States) Alec Robbins	All
ASM	8	BMW M3 E46	GT Radial	(United States) Robert Thorne R	All
BARBARIUS USA	357	Chevrolet Corvette C7 Z06	GT Radial	(Brazil) João Barion	All
Beechum Racing	999	BMW M3 E46	Nexen	(United States) Trenton Beechum	All
Cash Racing	16	BMW M3 E46	Vitour	(United States) Jonathan Hurst	All
Diego Higa Racing Team	169	Toyota GT86	GT Radial	(Brazil) Diego Higa R	All
Drift Cave Motorsports	777	Chevrolet Corvette C6	GT Radial	(United States) Matt Field	All
The Drift Force	33	Toyota GR86	Nexen	(Switzerland) Joshua Correa Reynolds	All
Feal Suspension Race Team	707	Nissan Silvia "S14.9"	GT Radial	(Norway) Simen Olsen	All
Feal Suspension Race Team	723	Nissan Silvia S15	GT Radial	(Lithuania) Aurimas Bakchis	All
FFF DRIFTING DEPARTMENT	117	Ferrari 599 GTB Fiorano	Nexen	(Italy) Federico Sceriffo	2–8
Forsberg Racing	64	Nissan Z	GT Radial	(United States) Chris Forsberg	All
Garagistic Racing	171	BMW M3 E36	Vitour	(United States) Rome Charpentier	All
Get Nuts Lab	808	Nissan Silvia S15	Kenda	(United States) Forrest Wang	All
The Heart of Racing	26	Aston Martin V12 Vantage	GT Radial	(New Zealand) Darren Kelly	All
HGK Motorsports	80	BMW M3 E92	GT Radial	(Latvia) Kristaps Blušs	2–8 (Note: HGK Motorsports were unable to import their equipment to the United States in time for the opening round.)
Huragan Racing	738	Toyota GR Supra; Toyota GT86 (Note: HGK Motorsports were unable to import their equipment to the United States in time for the opening round. Holovnia will instead pilot a Toyota GT86 at this round.)	GT Radial	(Ukraine) Oleksii Holovnia R	All
J Castro Racing - JCR	17	Toyota GR86	GT Radial	(Dominican Republic) Jhonnattan Castro	All
Jeff Jones Racing	818	Nissan 370Z	GT Radial	(United States) Jeff Jones	All
Jerry Yang Racing	123	Toyota GT86	GT Radial	(Japan) Kazuya Taguchi	All
Kyle Mohan Racing	99	Mazda RX-8	Vitour	(United States) Kyle Mohan	All
Mspek Performance	527	Nissan Silvia "S14.9"	Vitour	(United States) Daniel Stuke	All
Noback Racing with Jerry Yang Racing	54	BMW M3 E46	GT Radial	(United States) Nick Noback	All
Outlaw Garage	82	Chevrolet Corvette C6	Kenda	(United States) Taylor Hull	All
Papadakis Racing	151	Toyota GR Supra	Nitto	(Norway) Fredric Aasbø	All
Papadakis Racing	411	Toyota GR Corolla	Nitto	(United States) Ryan Tuerck	All
Power Racing	919	Nissan Silvia S15	GT Radial	(United States) Mike Power	All
RTR Motorsports	5	Ford Mustang RTR Spec 5-FD	Nitto	(United States) Adam LZ	1, 3–5
RTR Motorsports	25	Ford Mustang RTR Spec 5-FD	Nitto	(United States) Vaughn Gittin, Jr.	2, 6–8
RTR Motorsports	88	Ford Mustang RTR Spec 5-FD	Nitto	(United States) Chelsea DeNofa	All
RTR Motorsports	130	Ford Mustang RTR Spec 5-FD	Nitto	(Republic of Ireland) James Deane	All
Ryan Litteral Racing x Colab Garage	909	Nissan Silvia S15	GT Radial	(United States) Ryan Litteral	2–8
Sorensen Motorsports	513	BMW M3 E92	Nitto	(United States) Branden Sorensen	All
Team Japan Auto	153	Toyota Supra A80	Kenda	(Norway) Ola Jæger	All
Team Karnage	43	Dodge Viper ZB II	Nexen	(Republic of Ireland) Dean Kearney	All
Three's Racing	21	Toyota GR86	Nexen	(Japan) Ken Gushi	All
Travis Reeder Motorsports	77	BMW M3 E46	GT Radial	(United States) Travis Reeder	All
_Whip._	129	BMW M3 E46	GT Radial	(United States) Dylan Hughes	All

R Eligible for Rookie of the Year

=== Driver changes ===
- Dan Burkett was unable to raise sponsorship to fund a 2023 campaign, and elected to sit out the season while concentrating on finding a new sponsor for 2024.
- Three-time champion James Deane will return for the first time since 2019, signing with RTR Motorsports.
- 2013 champion Michael Essa will not return to the series, having taken a position building cars for Daily Driven Exotics.
- Joshua Love returned to the PROSPEC series for 2023.
- Adam LZ will drive a reduced schedule in 2023, participating in four rounds. Two-time champion Vaughn Gittin, Jr. will drive in the remaining four rounds, returning to the series after stepping back at the end of the 2021 season.
- Justin Pawlak will step back from the series, in order to focus on his son Jaxsen's drifting career.

=== Other changes ===
- For 2023, the limit of 37 full-season entries was removed.
- Falken Tire ended its partnership with Formula Drift.
- GT Radial renewed its partnership with the series through 2025.
- Kenda Tire became a new official supplier on a two-year agreement.
- Vitour Tires became a new official supplier on a two-year agreement.

== Schedule ==
Round	Title	Circuit	Location	Date	Winner	Car
1	Streets of Long Beach	(California) Streets of Long Beach	Long Beach, California	April 8	(United States) Matt Field	Chevrolet Corvette C6
2	Road to the Championship	(Georgia (U.S. state)) Road Atlanta	Braselton, Georgia	May 13	(United States) Vaughn Gittin, Jr.	Ford Mustang RTR Spec 5-FD
3	Scorched	(Florida) Orlando Speed World	Orlando, Florida	May 27	(United States) Chelsea DeNofa	Ford Mustang RTR Spec 5-FD
4	The Gauntlet	(New Jersey) Englishtown Raceway Park	Englishtown, New Jersey	June 24	(United States) Adam LZ	Ford Mustang RTR Spec 5-FD
5	Crossroads	(Missouri) World Wide Technology Raceway	St. Louis, Missouri	July 15	(Lithuania) Aurimas Bakchis	Nissan Silvia S15
6	Throwdown	(Washington (state)) Evergreen Speedway	Monroe, Washington	August 12	(United States) Chelsea DeNofa	Ford Mustang RTR Spec 5-FD
7	Elevated	Utah Motorsports Campus	Grantsville, Utah	September 16	(United States) Chelsea DeNofa	Ford Mustang RTR Spec 5-FD
8	Title Fight	(California) Irwindale Speedway	Irwindale, California	October 14	(United States) Nick Noback	BMW E46 M3

== Championship standings ==
=== Scoring system ===
During qualifying, drivers perform solo runs which are judged on parameters such as line, angle, style and "X-factor", all defined within the sporting regulations, and awarded a numerical score up to 100. These scores are ranked to determine the qualifying classification and populate the brackets for the competition phase. Only 32 spots in the main event are available. In addition, the top three qualifiers earn three, two and one championship points respectively.

The qualifiers proceed through a series of competition heats, with those eliminated in the first round (Top 32) receiving 16 points and classifying 17th through 32nd, the second round (Top 16) receiving 32 points and classifying 9th through 16th, the third round (Great 8) receiving 48 points and classifying 5th through 8th, and the fourth round (Final Four) classifying 3rd and 4th, receiving 76 and 64 points respectively. In the Final, the runner-up receives 88 points and the winner 100 points. Final classification within each round is then determined by highest qualifying position; for example, of the two drivers eliminated in the Final Four, the driver who qualified higher is awarded 3rd position and the final place on the podium.

The scoring system for the competition phase returned to that used in 2020, with a wider spread between the points awarded for each position compared to 2021 and 2022.

In the event of a tie on points, the driver who classified higher in the most recent round will be awarded the higher position.

==== Qualifying stage ====
Position	1st	2nd	3rd
Points	3	2	1

==== Competition stage ====
Position	1st	2nd	3rd	4th	5th–8th	9th–16th	17th–32nd
Points	100	88	76	64	48	32	16

=== Pro Championship standings ===
Pos	Driver	LBH	ATL	ORL	ENG	WWT	EVS	UTA	IRW	Pts
1	(United States) Chelsea DeNofa	7^{3}	12	1^{2}	15	7	1	1^{3}	17	480
2	(Lithuania) Aurimas Bakchis	18	3^{3}	9	8	1	5^{3}	13	2^{2}	445
3	(United States) Matt Field	1	6	14	3	14	**9^{1}**	2	22	427
4	(Norway) Simen Olsen	12	25	8	2	3	6^{2}	3^{2}	11	419
5	(Republic of Ireland) James Deane	6^{2}	7	7	4	18	3	**9^{1}**	3	413
6	(Norway) Fredric Aasbø	3	10	2	**17^{1}**	2	10	7	21	399
7	(United States) Ryan Tuerck	**5^{1}**	18	**5^{1}**	5^{2}	11 (Note: Tuerck received a bye run during the Top 16 at St. Louis, but he suffered an engine failure and was unable to complete the run. It was deemed that he had not advanced past the bracket, and so he was awarded a Top 16 finish. His position within the bracket was determined by qualifying results, as usual.)	4	4	4	392
8	(United States) Chris Forsberg	17	2	13	10	4	11	8	6	360
9	(United States) Dylan Hughes	21	5	4	9^{3}	12	2	18	10	329
10	(Japan) Kazuya Taguchi	24	19	3^{3}	11	**8^{1}** (Note: Taguchi was the highest qualifier of the drivers eliminated in the Top 16 at St. Louis, of which there were nine due to Tuerck's incomplete bye run.)	8	5	13	304
11	(United States) Rome Charpentier	2	28	21	6	27	7	25	18	264
12	(United States) Nick Noback	29	30	30	28	9^{2}	16	31	**1^{1}**	249
13	(Dominican Republic) Jhonnattan Castro	11	23	27	13	5	13	15	14	240
14	(United States) Jonathan Hurst	4	15	11	22	6	26	29	DNQ	224
15	(Republic of Ireland) Dean Kearney	14	27	32	27	10^{3}	15	11	16	209
16	(United States) Forrest Wang	8	9^{2}	12			30	22	5	194
17	(United States) Branden Sorensen	19	22	22	14	30	18	12	7	192
18	(United States) Travis Reeder	20	24	6	12	19	17	10	24	192
19	(Japan) Ken Gushi	13	29	29	16	13	DNQ	28	9^{3}	177
20	(United States) Robert Thorne RY	28	32	25	30	16	28	14	12	176
21	(United States) Daniel Stuke	10	14	10	18	24	24	21	25	176
22	(United States) Trenton Beechum	15	26	26	31	22	19	6	26	176
23	(United States) Vaughn Gittin, Jr.		**1^{1}**				23	23	15	167
24	(Latvia) Kristaps Blušs		4	16				26	8	160
25	(United States) Taylor Hull	16	16	23	19	25	21	32	20	160
26	(United States) Alec Robbins	9	13	18	26	26	27	27	29	160
27	(United States) Adam LZ	30		20	1	20				148
28	(Brazil) Diego Higa R	22	17	28	20	DNQ	12	16	19	144
29	(United States) Jeff Jones	23	11	24	23	23	DNQ	20	23	128
30	(Brazil) João Barion	DNQ	DNQ	DNQ	7	17	20	19	28	112
31	(United States) Ryan Litteral		DNQ	17	21	15	14	17	DNQ	112
32	(United States) Mike Power	27	20	19	25	28	29	30		112
33	(United States) Kyle Mohan	DNQ	31	DNQ	32	21	22	24	27	96
34	(Norway) Ola Jæger	26	21	DNQ	29	29	25	DNQ	30	96
35	(New Zealand) Darren Kelly	DNQ	8	15						80
36	(Ukraine) Oleksii Holovnia R	25	DNQ	31	24					48
37	(Switzerland) Joshua Correa Reynolds	DNQ								0

**In-line notation**
^{Superscript number}	Qualifying position (Top 3 only)
**Bold**	Top qualifier
RY	Rookie of the Year
R	Rookie

=== Auto Cup standings ===
Auto Cup points are awarded each round to the two drivers with the highest classified finish for each manufacturer. To be eligible, both the chassis and engine must have been constructed by that manufacturer.

Pos	Manufacturer	LBH	ATL	ORL	ENG	WWT	EVS	UTA	IRW	Pts
1	(United States) Ford	6^{2}	**1^{1}**	1^{2}	1	7	1	1^{3}	3	1048
1	(United States) Ford	7^{3}	7	7	4	18	3	**9^{1}**	15	1048
2	(Japan) Toyota	3	10	2	5^{2}	2	4	4	4	837
2	(Japan) Toyota	**5^{1}**	17	**5^{1}**	16	5	10	7	9^{3}	837
3	(United States) Chevrolet	1	6	14	3	14	**9^{1}**	2	20	619
3	(United States) Chevrolet	16	16	23	7	17	20	19	22	619
4	(Japan) Nissan	17	2	13	10	4	11	8	6	472
4	(Japan) Nissan			17	21	15	14	17	DNQ	472
5	(United States) Dodge	14	27	32	27	10^{3}	15	11	16	209
6	(Japan) Mazda	DNQ	31	DNQ	32	21	22	24	27	96
7	(United Kingdom) Aston Martin	DNQ	8	15						80

=== Tire Cup standings ===
Tire Cup points are awarded each round to the two drivers with the highest classified finish for each tire manufacturer.

Pos	Tire	LBH	ATL	ORL	ENG	WWT	EVS	UTA	IRW	Pts
1	(Singapore) GT Radial	1	2	3^{3}	2	1	2	2	**1^{1}**	1275
1	(Singapore) GT Radial	11	3^{3}	4	3	3	5^{3}	3^{2}	2^{2}	1275
2	(Japan) Nitto	3	**1^{1}**	1^{2}	1	2	1	1^{3}	3	1249
2	(Japan) Nitto	**5^{1}**	7	2	4	7	3	4	4	1249
3	(China) Vitour	2	14	10	6	6	7	21	18	536
3	(China) Vitour	4	15	11	18	24	22	24	25	536
4	(South Korea) Nexen	13	26	26	16	10^{3}	15	6	9^{3}	402
4	(South Korea) Nexen	14	27	29	27	13	19	11	26	402
5	(Chinese Taipei) Kenda	8	9^{2}	12	19	25	21	22	5	386
5	(Chinese Taipei) Kenda	9	13	18	26	26	25	27	20	386
