= 2021 Formula D season =

Motorsport season

The 2021 Formula D season (officially titled Formula Drift Pro Championship) was the eighteenth season of the Formula D series. The season began on May 8 at Road Atlanta and concluded on October 23 at Toyota Speedway at Irwindale after eight events. Toward the end of the season, three of Formula Drift's longest-serving members announced a departure from the series, all of whom had been part of Formula Drift since is inaugural season in 2004. Co-founder and series President Jim Liaw left to take up a new position at Performance Racing Industry, but retained a role in the series; his place was taken by Vice President and fellow co-founder Ryan Sage. 2011 champion Daijiro Yoshihara announced his retirement from the series ahead of the finale. 2010 and 2020 champion Vaughn Gittin, Jr. announced that he would step back from the series to give attention to other interests, including his participation in the ULTRA4 Racing Series, but he intended to participate again in the future. His seat at RTR Motorsports was filled by Adam LZ in 2022.

== Entries ==
Team	No.	Car	Tires	Driver	Round(s)
Alec Robbins Racing	35	Nissan 350Z	Federal (Note: Robbins competed with Federal Tires, but is listed as using GT Radial Tires on the official website.)	(United States) Alec Robbins	All
Asphalt Anarchy	82	Cadillac ATS-V	Nexen	(United States) Taylor Hull	All
Bakchis Motorsports	723	Nissan Silvia S15	Falken	(Lithuania) Aurimas Bakchis	All
Beechum Racing	999	Ford Mustang	Nexen	(United States) Trenton Beechum R	1–3, 5–8
BUY NOW JAPAN	530	Nissan Silvia S15	Nexen	(Japan) Wataru Masuyama	1–4, 6–8
Cash Racing	16	Infiniti G37	Nexen	(United States) Jonathan Hurst R	All
Drift Cave Motorsports	777	Chevrolet Corvette C6	Falken	(United States) Matt Field	All
Drift Force	33	BMW F22	Nexen	(Switzerland) Joshua Correa Reynolds R	1–6
Drift Force	91	BMW F22	Nexen	(Switzerland) Yves Meyer	1–7
Dylan Hughes Racing	129	BMW M3 E46	GT Radial	(United States) Dylan Hughes	All
Essa Autosport	101	BMW M3 E46	GT Radial	(United States) Michael Essa	All
FFF Drifting Department	117	Ferrari 599 GTB Fiorano	Nexen	(Italy) Federico Sceriffo	1–3, 5–8
Forsberg Racing	64	Nissan 370Z	GT Radial	(United States) Chris Forsberg	All
Garagistic	171	BMW M3 E36	Federal	(United States) Rome Charpentier	All
Gas Factory	9	Subaru BRZ	Falken	(Japan) Daijiro Yoshihara	All
Jeff Jones Racing	818	Nissan 370Z	GT Radial	(United States) Jeff Jones	All
Jhonnattan Castro	17	Toyota GT86	Federal; Nexen (Note: Castro used Federal Tires for the first round at Road Atlanta, but competed with Nexen Tires for the remainder of the season.)	(Dominican Republic) Jhonnattan Castro	1–7
Jonathan Nerren Racing	23	Nissan Silvia S14	Federal	(United States) Jonathan Nerren	1–7
KGMS Greddy Toyota Gazoo Racing	21	Toyota GR Supra	Nexen	(Japan) Ken Gushi	1–5, 7–8
Kyle Mohan Racing	99	Mazda RX-8	Federal	(United States) Kyle Mohan	All
LZMFG	5	Nissan Silvia S15	Nitto	(United States) Adam LZ	All
Papadakis Racing	151	Toyota GR Supra	Nitto	(Norway) Fredric Aasbø	All
Papadakis Racing	411	Toyota Corolla (E210)	Nitto	(United States) Ryan Tuerck	All
Pawlak Racing	13	Ford Mustang	Falken	(United States) Justin Pawlak	1–3, 5–8
RAD Industries	34	Toyota Supra A80	GT Radial	(United States) Dan Burkett	All
RTR Motorsports	25	Ford Mustang RTR Spec 5-D	Nitto	(United States) Vaughn Gittin, Jr.	All
RTR Motorsports	88	Ford Mustang RTR Spec 5-D	Nitto	(United States) Chelsea DeNofa	All
Ryan Litteral Racing	909	Nissan Silvia S15	GT Radial	(United States) Ryan Litteral	1, 3, 5–8
Simen Olsen Drifting	707	Toyota GR Supra	Federal (Note: Olsen competed Federal Tires, but is listed as using Nexen Tires on the official website.)	(Norway) Simen Olsen R	All
Sorensen Motorsports	513	BMW M4 F82	Nexen	(United States) Branden Sorensen R	All
Team Karnage	43	Dodge Viper ZB II	Nexen	(Republic of Ireland) Dean Kearney	All
Travis Reeder Motorsports	77	BMW M3 E46	GT Radial	(United States) Travis Reeder	All
Upgarage ISR Performance; GT Radial Jerry Yang Racing	123	Nissan Silvia S15	GT Radial	(Japan) Kazuya Taguchi	All

R Eligible for Rookie of the Year

== Schedule ==
Round	Title	Circuit	Location	Date	Winner	Car
1	Royal Purple Road to the Championship; Presented by O'Reilly Auto Parts	(Georgia (U.S. state)) Road Atlanta	Braselton, Georgia	May 8	(Lithuania) Aurimas Bakchis	(Japan) Nissan Silvia S15
2	Scorched	(Florida) Orlando Speed World	Orlando, Florida	May 22	(United States) Chelsea DeNofa	(United States) Ford Mustang RTR Spec 5-D
3	The AutoZone Gauntlet; Presented by TYPE S	(New Jersey) Englishtown Raceway Park	Englishtown, New Jersey	June 19	(United States) Matt Field	(United States) Chevrolet Corvette C6
4	Borderlands	(Pennsylvania) Lake Erie Speedway	Erie, Pennsylvania	July 10	(United States) Chelsea DeNofa	(United States) Ford Mustang RTR Spec 5-D
5	Throwdown	(Washington (state)) Evergreen Speedway	Monroe, Washington	July 31	(United States) Chelsea DeNofa	(United States) Ford Mustang RTR Spec 5-D
6	Crossroads	(Illinois) World Wide Technology Raceway	Madison, Illinois	August 28	(Norway) Fredric Aasbø	(United States) Toyota Supra
7	AutoZone Streets of Long Beach; Presented by TYPE S	(California) Streets of Long Beach	Long Beach, California	September 18	(Lithuania) Aurimas Bakchis	(Japan) Nissan Silvia S15
8	TYPE S Title Fight	(California) Irwindale Speedway	Irwindale, California	October 23	(Lithuania) Aurimas Bakchis	(Japan) Nissan Silvia S15

== Championship standings ==
=== Scoring system ===
The championship points system was altered for 2021, with points no longer awarded for qualifying positions. Points are awarded to the top 32 qualifiers for each event. The qualifiers proceed through a series of competition heats, with those eliminated in the first round (Top 32) receiving 35 points and classifying 17th through 32nd, the second round (Sweet 16) receiving 52 points and classifying 9th through 16th, the third round (Great 8) receiving 67 points and classifying 5th through 8th, and the fourth round (Final Four) receiving 80 points and classifying 3rd and 4th. In the Final, the runner-up receives 91 points and the winner 100 points. Final classification within each round is then determined by highest qualifying position; for example, of the two drivers eliminated in the Final Four, the driver who qualified higher is awarded 3rd position and the final place on the podium.

If 22 or fewer drivers are present, an alternative qualifying format is used in which a Last Chance Bracket (LCB) is populated by the drivers who qualify from 15th down. The top two LCB qualifiers enter the competition heats as normal, while the remaining LCB qualifiers (3rd down to a maximum of 8th if 22 drivers are present) receive 35 points, equivalent to the 17th–32nd positions at a regular event.

In the event of a tie on points at the end of the season, the driver who classified higher in the most recent round will be awarded the higher position.

Position	1st	2nd	3rd	4th	5th–8th	9th–16th	17th–32nd	LCB 3rd–8th
Points	100	91	80	80	67	52	35	35

=== Pro Championship standings ===
Pos	Driver	ATL	ORL	ENG	LES	EVS	WWT	LBH	IRW	Pts
1	(Norway) Fredric Aasbø	9	2	3	2	12	1	2	**2**	648
2	(United States) Matt Field	**2**	5	1	3	4	6	11	4	617
3	(Lithuania) Aurimas Bakchis	1	4	9	6	18	8	1	1	614 (Note: Bakchis was initially deemed at fault for a collision with Gittin during their Great 8 battle in Round 4, handing the win to Gittin and relegating Bakchis to an eventual 6th place finish. However, a later review determined Bakchis not at fault, and his score in the round was amended from 67 points to 80 points. Gittin's score was not affected.)
4	(United States) Chelsea DeNofa	14	**1**	**5**	1	1	12	5	7	605
5	(United States) Vaughn Gittin, Jr.	3	6	25	4	15	4	3	3	554
6	(United States) Ryan Tuerck	10	9	4	13	2	2	12	8	537
7	(United States) Chris Forsberg	18	10	2	27	6	13	4	6	479
8	(United States) Dylan Hughes	15	22	11	5	3	3	13	12	470
9	(Japan) Kazuya Taguchi	16	7	7	8	23	14	27	5	442
10	(United States) Michael Essa	21	20	12	10	**5**	7	6	9	427
11	(United States) Jeff Jones	4	11	18	17	8	19	15	14	408
12	(United States) Travis Reeder	13	12	6	16	7	20	18	19	395
13	(Republic of Ireland) Dean Kearney	7	8	8	20	16	26	26	23	393
14	(United States) Justin Pawlak	6	3	17		11	9	**9**	11	390
15	(Norway) Simen Olsen RY	31	15	15	25	10	22	25	16	348
16	(United States) Alec Robbins	23	14	16	18	27	**5**	32	29	346
17	(Japan) Daijiro Yoshihara	20	26	10	29	29	10	10	17	331 (Note: Although Yoshihara was classified below Furst in the season finale, he is placed ahead in the official championship standings.)
18	(United States) Jonathan Hurst R	30	21	24	21	9	21	14	15	331
19	(United States) Branden Sorensen R	11	17	13	22	17	11	21	25	331
20	(United States) Dan Burkett	17	13	26	15	19	16	24	26	331
21	(United States) Adam LZ	8	24	32	**9**	21	29	22	24	329
22	(Switzerland) Yves Meyer	5	16	28	7	22	25	30		326
23	(United States) Rome Charpentier	22	19	22	12	20	23	23	10	314
24	(United States) Kyle Mohan	28	31	30	26	31	30	16	13	314
25	(United States) Taylor Hull	24	27	27	11	24	18	17	18	297
26	(Japan) Wataru Masuyama	25	29	21	24		15	8	21	294
27	(Dominican Republic) Jhonnattan Castro	12	18	20	23	28	17	7		294
28	(Japan) Ken Gushi	19	23	19	28	13		28	20	262
29	(United States) Trenton Beechum R	27	28	29		14	31	31	28	262
30	(United States) Jonathan Nerren	32	30	23	14	25	24	19		262
31	(Italy) Federico Sceriffo	29	25	14		30	DNQ	29	27	227
32	(Switzerland) Joshua Correa Reynolds R	26	32	31	19	26	28			210
33	(United States) Ryan Litteral	NC		DNQ		32	27	20	22	140

**In-line notation**
**Bold**	Top qualifier
RY	Rookie of the Year
R	Rookie

=== Auto Cup standings ===
Auto Cup points are awarded each round to the two drivers with the highest classified finish for each manufacturer. To be eligible, both the chassis and engine must have been constructed by that manufacturer.

Pos	Manufacturer	ATL	ORL	ENG	LES	EVS	WWT	LBH	IRW	Pts
1	(Japan) Toyota	9	2	3	2	2	1	2	**2**	1200
1	(Japan) Toyota	10	9	4	13	12	2	7	5	1200
2	(United States) Ford	3	**1**	**5**	1	1	4	3	3	1187
2	(United States) Ford	6	3	17	4	11	9	5	7	1187
3	(Japan) Nissan	18	10	2	27	6	13	4	6	619
3	(Japan) Nissan	NC				32	27	20	22	619
4	(United States) Chevrolet	**2**	5	1	3	4	6	11	4	617
5	(Germany) BMW	21	20	12	10	**5**	7	6	9	427
6	(United States) Dodge	7	8	8	20	16	26	26	23	393
7	(Japan) Mazda	28	31	30	26	31	30	16	13	314
8	(United States) Cadillac	24	27	27	11	24	18	17	18	297
9	(Italy) Ferrari	29	25	14		30	DNQ	29	27	227

=== Tire Cup standings ===
Tire Cup points are awarded each round to the two drivers with the highest classified finish for each tire manufacturer.

Pos	Tire	ATL	ORL	ENG	LES	EVS	WWT	LBH	IRW	Pts
1	(Japan) Nitto	3	**1**	3	1	1	1	2	**2**	1413
1	(Japan) Nitto	8	2	4	2	2	2	3	3	1413
2	(Japan) Falken	1	3	1	3	4	6	1	1	1248
2	(Japan) Falken	**2**	4	9	6	11	8	**9**	4	1248
3	(Singapore) GT Radial	4	7	2	5	3	3	4	5	1118
3	(Singapore) GT Radial	13	10	6	8	**5**	**5**	6	6	1118
4	(South Korea) Nexen	5	8	8	7	9	11	7	15	937
4	(South Korea) Nexen	7	16	13	11	10	15	8	16	937
5	(Chinese Taipei) Federal	12	14	15	12	10	5	16	10	796
5	(Chinese Taipei) Federal	22	15	16	14	? (Note: Federal Tires scored 104 points in the fifth round at Seattle, corresponding to two drivers reaching the Sweet 16. Of the drivers that did, only one was using Federal Tires according to the official website. It is possible that another driver switched to Federal Tires for the event, or at some point throughout the season.)	22	19	13	796
