= 2022 Formula D season =

Motorsport season

The 2022 Formula D season (officially titled Formula Drift Pro Championship) was the nineteenth season of the Formula D series. The season began on April 2 at Long Beach and concluded on October 15 at Irwindale Speedway after eight events. The eight-round season saw an unprecedented seven different winners, including three first-time winners in Dylan Hughes, Travis Reeder and Kazuya Taguchi. The only driver to score multiple victories during the season was Aasbø.

== Entries ==
For 2022, Formula Drift imposed a limit of 37 drivers that could be awarded a full-season entry. Forrest Wang attempted to return to the series, having last competed in 2019 before taking a break from competition to raise a family. However, his two-year absence meant he no longer had priority status for a full-season entry, and his admission was not accepted.

Team	No.	Car	Tires	Driver	Round(s)
After Hours Autosports	711	BMW M3 E46	GT Radial	(United States) Joshua Love R	All
Alec Robbins Racing	35	Nissan 350Z	Federal	(United States) Alec Robbins	All
Bakchis Motorsports, LLC	723	Nissan Silvia S15	Falken	(Lithuania) Aurimas Bakchis	All
Beechum Racing	999	Ford Mustang	Nexen	(United States) Trenton Beechum	All
BUY NOW JAPAN	530	Nissan Silvia S15	Nexen; Federal	(Japan) Wataru Masuyama	All
Cash Racing	16	BMW M3 E46	Nexen; GT Radial	(United States) Jonathan Hurst	All
Drift Force	33	Toyota GT86	Nexen	(Switzerland) Joshua Correa Reynolds	1–4
Drift Force	91	Toyota GT86	Nexen	(Switzerland) Yves Meyer	All
Essa Autosport	101	BMW M3 E46	GT Radial	(United States) Michael Essa	All
FFF DRIFTINGDEPARTMENT.COM	117	Ferrari 599 GTB Fiorano	Nexen	(Italy) Federico Sceriffo	1–7
Five Bar Motorsports	357	Chevrolet Corvette C7 Z06	Nexen; GT Radial	(Brazil) João Barion	All
Forsberg Racing	64	Nissan Z (RZ34)	GT Radial	(United States) Chris Forsberg	All
Garagistic	171	BMW M3 E36	Federal	(United States) Rome Charpentier	All
JCR	17	Toyota GR86	Nexen	(Dominican Republic) Jhonnattan Castro	All
Jeff Jones Racing	818	Nissan 370Z	GT Radial	(United States) Jeff Jones	All
Jerry Yang Racing and Fabrication	123	Toyota GT86	GT Radial	(Japan) Kazuya Taguchi	All
Ken Gushi Motorsports	21	Toyota GR86	Nexen	(Japan) Ken Gushi	All
Kyle Mohan Racing	99	Mazda RX-8	Federal	(United States) Kyle Mohan	All
Matt Field	777	Chevrolet Corvette C6	Falken	(United States) Matt Field	All
Mspek Performance	527	Nissan Silvia S14.9	GT Radial	(United States) Daniel Stuke R	All
Noback Racing / KoruWorks	54	BMW M3 E46	GT Radial	(United States) Nick Noback R	All
Papadakis Racing	151	Toyota GR Supra	Nitto	(Norway) Fredric Aasbø	All
Pawlak Racing	13	Ford Mustang	Falken	(United States) Justin Pawlak	All
Power Racing	919	Nissan Silvia S15	GT Radial	(United States) Mike Power R	All
RAD Industries	34	Toyota Supra A80	GT Radial	(United States) Dan Burkett	All
RTR Motorsports	5	Ford Mustang RTR Spec 5-D	Nitto	(United States) Adam LZ	All
RTR Motorsports	88	Ford Mustang RTR Spec 5-D	Nitto	(United States) Chelsea DeNofa	All
Ryan Litteral Racing	909	Nissan Silvia S15	GT Radial	(United States) Ryan Litteral	All
Ryan Tuerck	411	Toyota GR Corolla	Nitto	(United States) Ryan Tuerck	All
Simen	707	Toyota GR Supra	Nexen; Federal; GT Radial	(Norway) Simen Olsen	All
Sorensen Motorsports	513	BMW M4 F82	Nexen	(United States) Branden Sorensen	All
Taylor Hull	82	Chevrolet Corvette C6	Nexen; GT Radial	(United States) Taylor Hull	All
Team DHR	129	BMW M3 E46	Falken	(United States) Dylan Hughes	All
Team Japan Auto	153	Toyota Supra A80	Nexen	(Norway) Ola Jæger R	2–8
Team Karnage	43	Dodge Viper (VX I)	Nexen	(Republic of Ireland) Dean Kearney	All
The Heart of Racing222	26	Aston Martin V12 Vantage	GT Radial	(New Zealand) Darren Kelly R	All
Travis Reeder Motorsports	77	BMW M3 E46	GT Radial	(United States) Travis Reeder	All

R Eligible for Rookie of the Year

== Schedule ==
Round	Title	Circuit	Location	Date	Winner	Car
1	AutoZone The Streets of Long Beach; Presented by TYPE S	(California) Streets of Long Beach	Long Beach, California	April 2	(United States) Ryan Tuerck	Toyota GR Corolla
2	AutoZone Road to the Championship; Presented by TYPE S	(Georgia (U.S. state)) Road Atlanta	Braselton, Georgia	May 7	(Norway) Fredric Aasbø	Toyota GR Supra
3	TYPE S Scorched; Presented by AutoZone	(Florida) Orlando Speed World	Orlando, Florida	May 21	(United States) Dylan Hughes	BMW M3 E46
4	The TYPE S Gauntlet; Presented by AutoZone	(New Jersey) Englishtown Raceway Park	Englishtown, New Jersey	June 11	(United States) Travis Reeder	BMW M3 E46
5	Crossroads	(Illinois) World Wide Technology Raceway	Madison, Illinois	July 16	(Japan) Kazuya Taguchi	Toyota GT86
6	Throwdown	(Washington (state)) Evergreen Speedway	Monroe, Washington	August 6	(United States) Chelsea DeNofa	Ford Mustang RTR
7	TYPE S Elevated; Presented by AutoZone	Utah Motorsports Campus	Grantsville, Utah	September 17	(Japan) Ken Gushi	Toyota GR86
8	TYPE S Title Fight presented by AutoZone	(California) Irwindale Speedway	Irwindale, California	October 15	(Norway) Fredric Aasbø	Toyota GR Supra

== Championship standings ==
=== Scoring system ===
During qualifying, drivers perform solo runs which are judged on parameters such as line, angle, fluidity and commitment and assigned a numerical score up to 100. These scores are then ranked to determine the qualifying classification and hence populate the brackets for the competition phase. 2022 sees the return of championship points being awarded for qualifying: the top qualifier is awarded three points, the second-placed qualifier two points and the third-placed qualifier one point.

The qualifiers proceed through a series of competition heats, with those eliminated in the first round (Top 32) receiving 35 points and classifying 17th through 32nd, the second round (Top 16) receiving 52 points and classifying 9th through 16th, the third round (Great 8) receiving 67 points and classifying 5th through 8th, and the fourth round (Final Four) receiving 80 points and classifying 3rd and 4th. In the Final, the runner-up receives 91 points and the winner 100 points. Final classification within each round is then determined by highest qualifying position; for example, of the two drivers eliminated in the Final Four, the driver who qualified higher is awarded 3rd position and the final place on the podium.

If 22 or fewer drivers are present, an alternative qualifying format is used in which a Last Chance Bracket (LCB) is populated by the drivers who qualify from 15th down. The top two LCB qualifiers enter the competition heats as normal, while the remaining LCB qualifiers (3rd down to a maximum of 8th if 22 drivers are present) receive 35 points, equivalent to the 17th–32nd positions at a regular event.

In the event of a tie on points at the end of the season, the driver who classified higher in the most recent round will be awarded the higher position.

==== Qualifying stage ====
Position	1st	2nd	3rd
Points	3	2	1

==== Competition stage ====
Position	1st	2nd	3rd	4th	5th–8th	9th–16th	17th–32nd	LCB 3rd–8th
Points	100	91	80	80	67	52	35	35

=== Pro Championship standings ===
Pos	Driver	LBH	ATL	ORL	ENG	WWT	EVS	UTA	IRW	Pts
1	(Norway) Fredric Aasbø	4	1^{3}	**3^{1}**	8	10	6	**2^{1}**	**1^{1}**	647
2	(United States) Matt Field	2^{3} (Note: The cars of Matt Field and Fredric Aasbø collided during their Final Four battle. Field was deemed not at fault and awarded the win, but his car was too badly damaged to compete in the Final.)	**3^{1}**	4	4	3	2	15	9	610
3	(United States) Ryan Tuerck	**1^{1}**	5	10 (Note: Ryan Tuerck debeaded a tire in his Top 16 battle with Chelsea DeNofa.)	5 (Note: Ryan Tuerck and Branden Sorensen collided during their Top 16 battle. Tuerck was deemed not at fault, but could not repair his car in time for his Great 8 battle with Travis Reeder.)	2	7	17	2	573
4	(United States) Chelsea DeNofa	5^{2}	9^{2}	5^{2}	**3^{1}**	26	1^{2}	3	13	544
5	(United States) Chris Forsberg	8	2	2	15	27	3^{3}	6	29	519
6	(United States) Dylan Hughes	7	17	1	9^{3}	5^{3}	5	5^{2}	12	511
7	(United States) Travis Reeder	28	11	6^{3}	1	18	14	13	6	461
8	(Japan) Ken Gushi	21	24	18 (Note: Ken Gushi suffered a suspected clutch issue on the way to the grid for his Top 32 battle with Daniel Stuke, handing the win to Stuke.)	7	4	11	1	15	456
9	(Lithuania) Aurimas Bakchis	3	4	21	10	15	30	11	7	453
10	(United States) Rome Charpentier	6	18	26	2	12	23	19	11	402
11	(Japan) Wataru Masuyama	14	21	22	14	7	10	7	17^{2}	397
12	(United States) Branden Sorensen	12	6	24	12	23	21	27	5^{3}	379
13	(United States) Jeff Jones	31	8	11	DNQ (Note: Jeff Jones suffered an engine failure during his first qualifying run, and was not able to make a second run.)	11	13	22	3	373
14	(United States) Michael Essa	17	26	7	17^{2}	19	9	28	8	363
15	(Japan) Kazuya Taguchi	DNQ	15	9	13	**1^{1}**	**17^{1}**	12	DNQ	349
16	(United States) Justin Pawlak	27	12	19	6	17^{2}	12	18	19	348
17	(United States) Mike Power RY	30	14	32	21	13	32	8	24	346
18	(United States) Dan Burkett	19	7	13	31	32	4	DNQ	32	339
19	(United States) Jonathan Hurst	16 (Note: The cars of Ryan Litteral and Jonathan Hurst collided during their Top 32 battle. Hurst was deemed not at fault and awarded the win, but his car was too badly damaged to compete in the Top 16.)	20	23	25 (Note: Jonathan Hurst called a Competition Time Out during his Top 32 battle with Daniel Stuke, but was unable to fix his car in the allotted time.)	9	31	10	23	331
20	(United States) Daniel Stuke R	10	22	8	11	20	DNQ	16	22	328
21	(United States) Taylor Hull	15	19	12	29	24	8	14	DNQ	328
22	(Republic of Ireland) Dean Kearney	13	DNQ	16	22	16	15	23	31	313
23	(United States) Nick Noback R	29	27	28	18	6	22	20	21	312
24	(Norway) Simen Olsen	26	29	DNQ	27 (Note: Simen Olsen's car shut down during his Top 32 battle with Fredric Aasbø in the chase position, and he was unable to take his lead run.)	25	29	4	16	307
25	(United States) Adam LZ	18	25	31	19	21	27	DNQ	4	290
26	(United States) Alec Robbins	24	13	20	32	DNQ	20	32	10	279
27	(Switzerland) Yves Meyer	25	31	14	20	14	19	DNQ	18	279
28	(Dominican Republic) Jhonnattan Castro	9	10	17	DNQ	DNQ	16	9^{3}	20	279
29	(United States) Ryan Litteral	20	DNQ	27	16	28	26	29	26	262
30	(Italy) Federico Sceriffo	DNQ	16	29	23	8	28	25		259
31	(United States) Kyle Mohan	11	23	DNQ	DNQ	30	24	26	14	244
32	(New Zealand) Darren Kelly R	32 (Note: Darren Kelly qualified 31st but struggled with power steering issues, which led him to withdraw his car from competition.)	28	15 (Note: Darren Kelly made contact with a spinning Alec Robbins during their Top 32 battle. Kelly was awarded the win but could not repair his car in time for his Top 16 battle with Dylan Hughes.)	26	DNQ	DNQ	24	28	227
33	(Norway) Ola Jæger R		32	25	30	31	DNQ	30	25	210
34	(Brazil) João Barion	22	30	DNQ	24	29	18	DNQ	30	210
35	(United States) Joshua Love R	23	DNQ	DNQ	DNQ	22	25	21	27	175
36	(United States) Trenton Beechum	DNQ	DNQ	30 (Note: Trenton Beechum lost a wheel during his Top 32 battle with Travis Reeder.)	28	DNQ	DNQ	31	DNQ	105
37	(Switzerland) Joshua Correa Reynolds	DNQ	DNQ	DNQ	DNQ					0

**In-line notation**
^{Superscript number}	Qualifying position (Top 3 only)
**Bold**	Top qualifier
RY	Rookie of the Year
R	Rookie

=== Auto Cup standings ===
Auto Cup points are awarded each round to the two drivers with the highest classified finish for each manufacturer. To be eligible, both the chassis and engine must have been constructed by that manufacturer.

Pos	Manufacturer	LBH	ATL	ORL	ENG	WWT	EVS	UTA	IRW	Pts
1	(Japan) Toyota	**1^{1}**	1^{3}	**3^{1}**	5	2	4	1	**1^{1}**	1326
1	(Japan) Toyota	4	5	9	7	4	6	**2^{1}**	2	1326
2	(United States) Chevrolet	2^{3}	**3^{1}**	4	4	3	2	14	9	973
2	(United States) Chevrolet	15	19	12	29	24	8	15	30	973
3	(United States) Ford	5^{2}	9^{2}	5^{2}	**3^{1}**	17^{2}	1^{2}	3	4	937
3	(United States) Ford	18	12	19	6	21	12	18	13	937
4	(Japan) Nissan	8	2	2	15	27	3^{3}	6	26	781
4	(Japan) Nissan	20	DNQ	27	16	28	26	29	29	781
5	(Germany) BMW	17	26	7	17^{2}	19	9	28	8	363
6	(United States) Dodge	13	DNQ	16	22	16	15	23	31	313
7	(Italy) Ferrari	DNQ	16	29	23	8	28	25		259
8	(Japan) Mazda	11	23	DNQ	DNQ	30	24	26	14	244

=== Tire Cup standings ===
Tire Cup points are awarded each round to the two drivers with the highest classified finish for each tire manufacturer.

Pos	Tire	LBH	ATL	ORL	ENG	WWT	EVS	UTA	IRW	Pts
1	(Japan) Nitto	**1^{1}**	1^{3}	**3^{1}**	**3^{1}**	2	1^{2}	**2^{1}**	**1^{1}**	1333
1	(Japan) Nitto	4	5	5^{2}	5	10	6	3	2	1333
2	(Singapore) GT Radial	8	2	2	1	**1^{1}**	3^{3}	4	3	1213
2	(Singapore) GT Radial	10	7	6^{3}	11	6	4	6	6	1213
3	(Japan) Falken	2^{3}	**3^{1}**	1	4	3	2	5^{2}	7	1208
3	(Japan) Falken	3	4	4	6	5^{3}	5	11	9	1208
4	(South Korea) Nexen	9	10	12	7	4	11	1	15	887
4	(South Korea) Nexen	13	16	14	20	8	15	23	18	887
5	(Chinese Taipei) Federal	6	13	20	2	7	10	7	10	831
5	(Chinese Taipei) Federal	11	18	26	14	12	20	19	11	831
