= 2019 Formula D season =

Motorsport season

The 2019 Formula D season (officially titled Formula DRIFT Black Magic Pro Championship) was the sixteenth season of the Formula D series. The season began on April 6 at Long Beach and concluded on October 19 at Toyota Speedway at Irwindale after eight events.

Driver Travis Reeder made Formula Drift history by becoming the first driver to compete with an electric vehicle. His team Napoleon Motorsports developed a fully electric Chevrolet Camaro dubbed the Chevrolet Camaro EL1. Reeder was unable to run it during the opening round at Long Beach since the event's fire safety teams had not been given training on electric vehicle fires. He practiced with the car during the second round at Orlando but competed with his regular Nissan 240SX S13. The car made its first competitive appearance in the third round at Road Atlanta, and he campaigned it until the finale at Irwindale when minor issues forced him to revert to his S13.

Two drivers also made history during the season by scoring a perfect 100 on a qualifying run, something that had only been previously achieved by Tanner Foust at Sonoma Raceway in 2006. Justin Pawlak recorded a perfect score during the fourth round at Wall Speedway, and James Deane recorded a perfect score during the seventh round at Texas Motor Speedway.

Two drivers made a one-off appearance at Long Beach: Mitch Larner, renting a Toyota 2JZ powered Nissan 240SX S14 from fellow competitor Forrest Wang, and Manuel Vacca, driving a BMW E46.

== Entries ==
Team	No.	Car	Tires	Driver	Round(s)
Asphalt Anarchy	82	Cadillac ATS-V	Achilles	(United States) Taylor Hull	All
Bakchis Motorsports	723	Nissan Silvia S14	Falken	(Lithuania) Aurimas Bakchis	All
Bridges Racing	43	Dodge Viper ZB II	Achilles	(Republic of Ireland) Dean Kearney	All
Chris Forsberg Racing	64	Nissan 370Z	Nexen	(United States) Chris Forsberg	All
Coffman Racing	959	Nissan 240SX S13	Achilles	(United States) Matt Coffman	1–6
Drift Cave Motorsports	46	Nissan 240SX	Achilles	(United States) Patrick Goodin	1–7
Drift Cave Motorsports	777	Chevrolet Corvette C6	Falken	(United States) Matt Field	All
Enjuku Racing	352	Nissan Silvia S14	Achilles	(United States) Kevin Lawrence	All
Essa Autosport	101	BMW M3 E46	Achilles	(United States) Michael Essa	All
FFF Drifting Department	117	Ferrari 599 GTB Fiorano	Nexen	(Italy) Federico Sceriffo	All
Get Nuts Lab	11	Nissan 240SX S14	Achilles	(Australia) Mitch Larner R	1
Get Nuts Lab	808	Nissan Silvia S15	Achilles	(United States) Forrest Wang	All
Greddy Racing/Ken Gushi motorsports	21	Toyota GT86	Achilles	(Japan) Ken Gushi	All
Hohnadell Racing	118	Nissan 240SX S14	Nexen	(United States) Alec Hohnadell	1–3
HP Garage	19	BMW M3 E46	Achilles	(Italy) Manuel Vacca R	1
Huddy Racing	129	BMW M3 E46	Achilles	(United States) Dylan Hughes R	1–7
Jeff Jones Racing	818	Nissan 370Z	Nexen	(United States) Jeff Jones	All
Jhonnattan Castro	717	Subaru BRZ	Nexen	(Dominican Republic) Jhonnattan Castro	All
Kazuya Taguchi	123	Nissan GT-R; Nissan Silvia S15 (Note: Taguchi competed in a Nissan GT-R at Long Beach but used a Nissan Silvia S15 for the remainder of the season.)	Achilles	(Japan) Kazuya Taguchi	All
KORUWORKS	909	Nissan 350Z	Nexen	(United States) Ryan Litteral	All
Kyle Mohan Racing	99	Mazda RX-8	Nexen	(United States) Kyle Mohan	All
Meeks Drift	316	Cadillac ATS-V	Nexen	(United States) Austin Meeks	All
Nando Drift Team	357	Chevrolet Corvette C7 Z06	Achilles	(Brazil) João Barion R	1–3, 6–8
Napoleon Motorsports	77	Nissan 240SX S13; Chevrolet Camaro EL1	Nitto	(United States) Travis Reeder R	All
Papadakis Racing	151	Toyota Corolla (E210)	Nexen	(Norway) Fredric Aasbø	All
Pawlak Racing	13	Ford Mustang	Falken	(United States) Justin Pawlak	All
RAD Industries	34	Toyota Supra A80	Nexen	(United States) Dan Burkett	All
RTR Motorsports	25	Ford Mustang RTR Spec 5-D	Nitto	(United States) Vaughn Gittin, Jr.	All
RTR Motorsports	88	Ford Mustang RTR	Nitto	(United States) Chelsea DeNofa	All
Ryan Tuerck Racing	411	Toyota GT86	Nitto	(United States) Ryan Tuerck	All
SSG Motorsport	111	Nissan Silvia S14	Nexen	(Canada) Sebastien Gauthier R	1–4, 6–8
Stratton Racing	33	Chevrolet Corvette C6	Achilles	(United States) Dirk Stratton	All
Team DAI.	9	Subaru BRZ	Falken	(Japan) Daijiro Yoshihara	All
Team IMR	17	BMW M3 E46	Nitto	(Peru) Alex Heilbrunn	1–4
Worthouse Drift Team	130	Nissan Silvia S15	Falken	(Republic of Ireland) James Deane	All
Worthouse Drift Team	215	Nissan Silvia S15	Falken	(Poland) Piotr Więcek	All

R Eligible for Rookie of the Year

== Schedule ==
Round	Title	Circuit	Location	Date	Winner	Car
1	O'Reilly Auto Parts The Streets of Long Beach; Presented by Permatex	(California) Streets of Long Beach	Long Beach, California	April 6	(Lithuania) Aurimas Bakchis	Nissan Silvia S14
2	AutoZone Scorched; Presented by Black Magic	(Florida) Orlando Speed World	Orlando, Florida	April 27	(Lithuania) Aurimas Bakchis	Nissan Silvia S14
3	O'Reilly Auto Parts Road to the Championship; Presented by Permatex	(Georgia (U.S. state)) Road Atlanta	Braselton, Georgia	May 11	(Norway) Fredric Aasbø	Toyota Corolla (E210)
4	The Advance Auto Parts Gauntlet; Presented by Black Magic	(New Jersey) Wall Stadium	Wall Township, New Jersey	June 8	(United States) Ryan Tuerck	Toyota GT86
5	Permatex Throwdown; Presented by AutoZone	(Washington (state)) Evergreen Speedway	Monroe, Washington	July 20	(Poland) Piotr Więcek	Nissan Silvia S15
6	Pep Boys Crossroads; Presented by Rain-X	(Illinois) World Wide Technology Raceway	Madison, Illinois	August 10	(Republic of Ireland) James Deane	Nissan Silvia S15
7	Advance Auto Parts Showdown; Presented by Rain-X	Texas Motor Speedway	Fort Worth, Texas	September 14	(United States) Chelsea DeNofa	Ford Mustang RTR
8	AutoZone Title Fight; Presented by Rain-X	(California) Toyota Speedway at Irwindale	Irwindale, California	October 19	(Japan) Ken Gushi	Toyota GT86

== Championship standings ==
=== Scoring system ===
Points were awarded for qualifying and for the main event. During qualifying, drivers performed solo runs which were judged on parameters such as line, angle, fluidity and commitment and assigned a numerical score up to 100. These scores were then ranked to determine the qualifying classification and hence populate the brackets for the competition phase. Up to 6 points were then awarded for the top 32 qualifiers.

The qualifiers proceed through a series of competition heats, with those eliminated in the first round (Top 32) receiving 16 points, the second round (Sweet 16) receiving 32 points, the third round (Great 8) receiving 48 points, and the fourth round (Final Four) receiving 64 points and classifying 3rd and 4th. Of the two drivers eliminated in the Final Four, the driver who qualified highest is awarded third place and the final step on the podium. In the Final, the runner-up receives 80 points and the winner 100 points. Final classification within each round is then determined by highest qualifying position; for example, of the two drivers eliminated in the Final Four, the driver who qualified higher is awarded 3rd position and the final place on the podium.

==== Qualifying stage ====
Position	1st	2nd	3rd	4th–8th	9th–16th	17th–32nd
Points	6	5	4	3	2	1

==== Competition stage ====
Position	1st	2nd	3rd	4th	5th–8th	9th–16th	17th–32nd
Points	100	80	64	64	48	32	16

=== Pro Championship standings ===
Pos	Driver	LBH	ORL	ATL	WNJ	EVS	WWT	TEX	IRW	Pts
1	(Republic of Ireland) James Deane	6^{2}	11^{10}	3^{4}	3^{5}	2^{2}	**1^{1}**	**2^{1}**	3^{6}	565
2	(Norway) Fredric Aasbø	4^{10}	**9^{1}**	**1^{1}**	2^{2}	14^{18}	2^{2}	4^{11}	13^{10}	513
3	(Lithuania) Aurimas Bakchis	1^{5}	1^{5}	5^{5}	11^{6}	12^{13}	5^{7}	5^{2}	4^{8}	497
4	(Poland) Piotr Więcek	7^{3}	6^{3}	6^{6}	6^{7}	**1^{1}**	3^{4}	6^{3}	6^{7}	482
5	(United States) Ryan Tuerck	17^{7}	16^{15}	2^{3}	1^{9}	9^{3}	4^{6}	8^{29}	5^{3}	443
6	(United States) Chris Forsberg	3^{8}	2^{7}	7^{8}	12^{8}	4^{11}	10^{5}	3^{5}	10^{4}	439
7	(United States) Michael Essa	12^{12}	15^{14}	4^{10}	14^{12}	7^{8}	8^{25}	10^{8}	2^{12}	385
8	(United States) Chelsea DeNofa	10^{9}	3^{6}	9^{2}	13^{10}	10^{6}	9^{3}	1^{7}	**9^{1}**	384
9	(Japan) Daijiro Yoshihara	9^{4}	5^{2}	10^{7}	9^{3}	3^{4}	12^{11}	7^{9}	8^{16}	360
10	(United States) Vaughn Gittin, Jr.	11^{11}	4^{16}	16^{24}	4^{11}	15^{21}	6^{12}	18^{13}	7^{13}	350
11	(Japan) Ken Gushi	13^{17}	13^{12}	17^{9}	7^{14}	5^{5}	19^{13}	11^{10}	1^{2}	343
12	(United States) Justin Pawlak	8^{13}	7^{4}	21^{18}	**5^{1}**	6^{7}	13^{15}	17^{4}	11^{5}	311
13	(United States) Forrest Wang	2^{6}	8^{8}	11^{12}	10^{4}	24^{23}	11^{10}	19^{17}	14^{11}	305
14	(United States) Matt Field	**5^{1}**	12^{11}	13^{17}	8^{20}	11^{10}	7^{14}	15^{16}	17^{17}	305
15	(Japan) Kazuya Taguchi	23^{22}	19^{19}	18^{11}	16^{18}	20^{17}	15^{20}	9^{6}	12^{9}	204
16	(United States) Travis Reeder RY	15^{19}	18^{18}	31^{31}	31^{31}	16^{24}	21^{18}	12^{12}	16^{15}	202
17	(Republic of Ireland) Dean Kearney	14^{18}	17^{17}	12^{14}	22^{22}	25^{25}	18^{9}	14^{15}	19^{19}	187
18	(Dominican Republic) Jhonnattan Castro	19^{15}	21^{21}	15^{22}	25^{25}	21^{19}	16^{24}	20^{18}	15^{14}	186
19	(United States) Ryan Litteral	16^{26}	25^{25}	26^{26}	21^{21}	17^{9}	20^{16}	13^{14}	18^{18}	171
20	(United States) Patrick Goodin	25^{24}	10^{9}	8^{15}	17^{13}	18^{12}	25^{23}	30^{30}		171
21	(United States) Jeff Jones	32^{32}	24^{24}	20^{16}	15^{17}	23^{22}	27^{27}	29^{28}	25^{25}	153
22	(United States) Dirk Stratton	26^{25}	26^{26}	14^{20}	24^{24}	22^{20}	24^{22}	22^{21}	22^{22}	152
23	(United States) Dylan Hughes R	DNQ	22^{22}	19^{13}	19^{16}	8^{14}	17^{8}	27^{26}		139
24	(United States) Taylor Hull	27^{27}	27^{27}	25^{25}	27^{27}	26^{26}	31^{31}	24^{23}	23^{23}	136
25	(United States) Dan Burkett	24^{23}	31^{31}	23^{21}	23^{23}	27^{27}	23^{21}	28^{27}	26^{26}	136
26	(Italy) Federico Sceriffo	28^{28}	29^{29}	27^{27}	29^{29}	28^{28}	22^{19}	26^{25}	28^{28}	136
27	(United States) Matt Coffman	20^{16}	23^{23}	22^{19}	20^{19}	13^{16}	14^{17}			136
28	(United States) Kevin Lawrence	DNQ	32^{32}	32^{32}	30^{30}	19^{15}	30^{30}	25^{24}	27^{27}	120
29	(United States) Kyle Mohan	31^{31}	DNQ	28^{28}	28^{28}	30^{30}	29^{29}	23^{22}	20^{20}	119
30	(United States) Austin Meeks	30^{30}	28^{28}	DNQ	26^{26}	29^{29}	28^{28}	31^{31}	24^{24}	119
31	(Brazil) João Barion R	DNQ	30^{30}	30^{30}			26^{26}	16^{20}	29^{29}	101
32	(Peru) Alex Heilbrunn	18^{14}	14^{13}	24^{23}	18^{15}					87
33	(Canada) Sebastien Gauthier R	29^{29}	DNQ	29^{29}	DNQ		32^{32}	21^{19}	21^{21}	85
34	(United States) Alec Hohnadell	21^{20}	20^{20}	DNQ						34
35	(Australia) Mitch Larner R	22^{21}								17
NC	(Italy) Manuel Vacca R	DNQ								0

**In-line notation**
^{Superscript number}	Qualifying position
**Bold**	Top qualifier
RY	Rookie of the Year
R	Rookie

=== Auto Cup standings ===
Auto Cup points are awarded each round to the two drivers with the highest classified finish for each manufacturer. To be eligible, both the chassis and engine must have been constructed by that manufacturer.

Pos	Manufacturer	LBH	ORL	ATL	WNJ	EVS	WWT	TEX	IRW	Pts
1	(Japan) Toyota	4^{10}	**9^{1}**	**1^{1}**	1^{9}	5^{5}	2^{2}	4^{11}	1^{2}	1059
1	(Japan) Toyota	13^{17}	13^{12}	2^{3}	2^{2}	9^{3}	4^{6}	8^{29}	5^{3}	1059
2	(United States) Ford	8^{13}	3^{6}	9^{2}	4^{11}	6^{7}	6^{12}	1^{7}	7^{13}	789
2	(United States) Ford	10^{9}	4^{16}	16^{24}	**5^{1}**	10^{6}	9^{3}	17^{4}	**9^{1}**	789
3	(Japan) Nissan	3^{8}	2^{7}	7^{8}	12^{8}	4^{11}	10^{5}	3^{5}	10^{4}	644
3	(Japan) Nissan	23^{22}	19^{19}	18^{11}	16^{18}	19^{15}	15^{20}	9^{6}	12^{9}	644
4	(United States) Chevrolet	**5^{1}**	12^{11}	13^{17}	8^{20}	11^{10}	7^{14}	15^{16}	17^{17}	473
4	(United States) Chevrolet	26^{25}	26^{26}	14^{20}	24^{24}	22^{20}	24^{22}	16^{20}	22^{22}	473
5	(Germany) BMW	12^{12}	15^{14}	4^{10}	14^{12}	7^{8}	8^{25}	10^{8}	2^{12}	385
6	(United States) Cadillac	27^{27}	27^{27}	25^{25}	26^{26}	26^{26}	28^{28}	24^{23}	23^{23}	255
6	(United States) Cadillac	30^{30}	28^{28}	DNQ	27^{27}	29^{29}	31^{31}	31^{31}	24^{24}	255
7	(United States) Dodge	14^{18}	17^{17}	12^{14}	22^{22}	25^{25}	18^{9}	14^{15}	19^{19}	187
8	(Italy) Ferrari	28^{28}	29^{29}	27^{27}	29^{29}	28^{28}	22^{19}	26^{25}	28^{28}	136
9	(Japan) Mazda	31^{31}	DNQ	28^{28}	28^{28}	30^{30}	29^{29}	23^{22}	20^{20}	119

=== Tire Cup standings ===
Tire Cup points are awarded each round to the two drivers with the highest classified finish for each tire manufacturer.

Pos	Tire	LBH	ORL	ATL	WNJ	EVS	WWT	TEX	IRW	Pts
1	(Japan) Falken	1^{5}	1^{5}	3^{4}	3^{5}	**1^{1}**	**1^{1}**	**2^{1}**	3^{6}	1189
1	(Japan) Falken	**5^{1}**	5^{2}	5^{5}	**5^{1}**	2^{2}	3^{4}	5^{2}	4^{8}	1189
2	(South Korea) Nexen	3^{8}	2^{7}	**1^{1}**	2^{2}	4^{11}	2^{2}	3^{5}	10^{4}	952
2	(South Korea) Nexen	4^{10}	**9^{1}**	7^{8}	12^{8}	14^{18}	10^{5}	4^{11}	13^{10}	952
3	(Japan) Nitto	10^{9}	3^{6}	2^{3}	1^{9}	9^{3}	4^{6}	1^{7}	5^{3}	932
3	(Japan) Nitto	11^{11}	4^{16}	9^{2}	4^{11}	10^{6}	6^{12}	8^{29}	7^{13}	932
4	(Indonesia) Achilles	2^{6}	8^{8}	4^{10}	7^{14}	5^{5}	8^{25}	9^{6}	1^{2}	845
4	(Indonesia) Achilles	12^{12}	10^{9}	8^{15}	10^{4}	7^{8}	11^{10}	10^{8}	2^{12}	845
