= 2016 Formula D season =

2016 Formula D

Seasons
- ← 2015 2017 →

The 2016 Formula D season is the thirteenth season of the Formula D Pro Championship series and third season of the Pro2 series. The Pro Championship series began on April 8 at Long Beach and ended on October 8 at Irwindale Speedway with Chris Forsberg winning his third Pro Championship. The Pro2 series began on May 5 at Road Atlanta and ended on October 1 at Wild Horse Motorsports Park with Marc Landreville winning the series.

== Schedule and results ==
Round		Title	Venue	Location	Date	Winner	Car
Pro	Pro2	Title	Venue	Location	Date	Winner	Car
1		Streets of Long Beach	(California) Streets of Long Beach	Long Beach, CA	April 8 – 9	(United States) Chelsea DeNofa	BMW E46
	1		(Georgia (U.S. state)) Road Atlanta	Braselton, GA	May 5 – 6	(United States) Jeff Jones	Nissan S14
2		Road to the Championship	(Georgia (U.S. state)) Road Atlanta	Braselton, GA	May 6 – 7	(United States) Vaughn Gittin Jr.	Ford Mustang
	2		(Florida) Orlando Speed World	Orlando, FL	June 3 – 4	(Canada) Marc Landreville	Nissan S14
3		Uncharted Territory	(Florida) Orlando Speed World	Orlando, FL	June 3 – 4	(Norway) Fredric Aasbø	Scion tC
4		The Gauntlet	(New Jersey) Wall Township Speedway	Wall Township, NJ	June 17 – 18	(United States) Vaughn Gittin Jr.	Ford Mustang
5		True North	(Quebec) Autodrome Saint-Eustache	St.Eustache, QC, Canada	July 15 – 16	(Norway) Fredric Aasbø	Scion tC
6		Throwdown	(Washington (state)) Evergreen Speedway	Monroe, WA	August 5 – 6	(Lithuania) Aurimas Bakchis	Hyundai Genesis
	3		Texas Motor Speedway	Fort Worth, TX	September 8 – 9	(Canada) Marc Landreville	Nissan S14
7		Showdown	Texas Motor Speedway	Fort Worth, TX	September 9 – 10	(United States) Matt Field	Nissan S14
	4		(Arizona) Wild Horse Motorsports Park	Chandler, AZ	September 31 – October 1	(Canada) Marc Landreville	Nissan S14
8		Title Fight	(California) Irwindale Speedway	Irwindale, CA	October 7 – 8	(United States) Matt Field	Nissan S14

=== Calendar changes & notes ===
- The Super Drift Challenge took place on April 15 & 16 at the Streets of Long Beach course, with Matt Field beating Michael Essa in the final round.

== Entries ==
=== Pro championship ===
Tire	Team	Car	No.	Drivers	Round(s)
Achilles	Drift Ebisu with Achilles	Toyota Mark II	100	(Scotland) Andrew Gray	2–7
Achilles	Sogun Motorsports Achilles	Infiniti G37	84	(Hong Kong) Charles Ng	All
Achilles	Bridges Racing	Dodge Viper	43	(Republic of Ireland) Dean Kearney	All
Achilles	Logic Aside	Nissan S14	53	(United States) Faruk Kugay	All
Achilles	JR Motorsports	Nissan S15	200	(Finland) Juha Rintanen	All
Achilles	Team Fast Kenny	BMW E46	22	(Norway) Kenneth Moen	1–3, 6, 8
Achilles	HGK Motorsports	BMW E46	80	(Latvia) Kristaps Bluss	1–4, 6–8
Achilles	Essa Autosport	BMW E46	101	(United States) Michael Essa	All
Achilles		Infiniti G37	31	(Japan) Robbie Nishida	1, 3–8
Falken	Bakchis Motorsports	Hyundai Genesis	723	(Lithuania) Aurimas Bakchis	All
Falken	Cameron Moore Drift	Lexus SC300	333	(United States) Cameron Moore	All
Falken	DAI.	Subaru BRZ	9	(Japan) Daijiro Yoshihara	All
Falken	Pawlak Racing	Ford Mustang	13	(United States) Justin Pawlak	All
Falken	Coffman Racing	Nissan S13	959	(United States) Matt Coffman	All
Falken	Driftcave Motorsports	Nissan S14	777	(United States) Matt Field	All
Falken	Pat Goodin Racing	Nissan S13	46	(United States) Pat Goodin	All
Falken	Drift Paddock	Nissan 350Z	90	(United States) Pat Mordaunt	1–4, 6–8
Falken	Tyler McQuarrie Racing	Chevrolet Camaro	17	(United States) Tyler McQuarrie	All
GT Radial		BMW E46	88	(United States) Chelsea DeNofa	All
GT Radial	Kyle Mohan Racing	Mazda MX-5	99	(United States) Kyle Mohan	All
Hankook	NOS Energy Drink Drift Team	Nissan 370Z	64	(United States) Chris Forsberg	All
Hankook	Get Nuts Lab	Nissan S15	808	(United States) Forrest Wang	All
Hankook	Chris Forsberg Racing	Nissan 370Z	15	(United States) Geoff Stoneback	All
Hankook	Gumout, Nameless Performance, Hankook, SRby Toyota FRS	Scion FR-S	411	(United States) Ryan Tuerck	All
Hankook	Get Nuts Lab	Nissan S14	988	(Taiwan) Shengjun Zhang	1
Nexen	Hohnadell Racing	Nissan S14	118	(United States) Alec Hohnadell	All
Nexen	Papadakis Racing	Scion tC	1	(Norway) Fredric Aasbø	All
Nexen	Jeff Jones Racing	Nissan S14	818	(United States) Jeff Jones	1–4, 6–8
Nexen	Jhonnattan Castro Racing	Scion FR-S	717	(Dominican Republic) Jhonnattan Castro	All
Nexen	GReddy Racing - Nexen Tire - SR by Toyota 86 Team	Toyota 86	21	(Japan) Ken Gushi	All
Nexen	Rockstar Energy Drink Nexen Tire VW Passat	Volkswagen Passat	34	(United States) Tanner Foust	2, 6–7
Nitto	Team RTS	BMW E46	949	(Peru) Alex Heilbrunn	1–4, 6–8
Nitto	Red Bull, Nitto Tire, Mazda	Mazda MX-5	123	(New Zealand) Mike Whiddett	All
Nitto	Mustang RTR Drift Team	Ford Mustang	25	(United States) Vaughn Gittin	All

=== Pro 2 ===
Tire	Team	Car	No.	Drivers	Round(s)
Achilles	Aaron Day Racing	Nissan S14	124	(Canada) Aaron Day	1, 3–4
Achilles	Meeks Drift	Nissan S14	316	(United States) Austin Meeks	All
Achilles	Stratton Racing	Chevrolet Corvette	33	(United States) Dirk Stratton	All
Achilles	Red Baron Racing	BMW E30	418	(United States) Donovan Brockway	All
Achilles	D’VANZ Motorsports	Ford Mustang	19	(United States) Doug Van Den Brink	1–2, 4
Achilles	Ethan Hunter Drift	Nissan S14	37	(United States) Ethan Hunter	1, 3–4
Achilles	Drift Chick	Nissan S14	42	(United States) Kelsey Rowlings	1, 3–4
Achilles		BMW E36	3	(Puerto Rico) Luis Lizardi	1–2, 4
Achilles	Marc Landreville Racing	Nissan S14	11	(Canada) Marc Landreville	All
Achilles	Matt Madrigali Racing	Nissan S13	415	(Canada) Matt Madrigali	All
Achilles		Toyota Mark II	54	(Singapore) Ng Sheng Nian	All
Falken	Andrew Lewis Racing	Nissan S13	36	(United States) Andrew Lewis	All
Falken	JMR Josh McGuire Racing	Nissan S14	63	(United States) Josh McGuire	All
Falken	Team Enjuku	Nissan S14	352	(United States) Kevin Lawrence	All
Falken	Team Enjuku	Nissan S13	144	(United States) Nate Hamilton	All
Falken	Asphalt Anarchy	Nissan S14	82	(United States) Taylor Hull	All
Falken	Beechum Racing	Ford Mustang	999	(United States) Trenton Beechum	All
GT Radial	Ryan Litteral Racing	Nissan S14	909	(United States) Ryan Litteral	All
Hankook	MVK Racing	Nissan S13	18	(United States) Matt VanKirk	3–4
Nexen	RAD Industries	Toyota Supra	134	(United States) Dan Burkett	All
Nexen	Jeff Jones Racing	Nissan S14	818	(United States) Jeff Jones	All
Nitto	IAS Performance	Nissan S14	142	(United States) Randall Waters	3–4

== Results and standings ==
=== Pro championship ===
==== Standings ====
Event winners in bold.

Pos	Driver	LBH	ATL	ORL	WTS	ASE	EVS	TEX	IRW	Points
1	(United States) Chris Forsberg	32.00	68.00	68.00	84.00	83.00	84.00	84.00	36.00	539.00
2	(Norway) Fredric Aasbø	80.00	22.00	**104.00**	52.00	**104.00**	52.00	53.00	35.00	502.00
3	(United States) Vaughn Gittin Jr.	48.00	**107.00**	39.00	**104.00**	67.00	39.00	39.00	19.00	462.00
4	(Lithuania) Aurimas Bakchis	64.00	52.00	37.00	38.00	68.00	**106.00**	52.00	35.00	452.00
5	(United States) Matt Field	48.00	21.00	36.00	51.00	35.00	51.00	**103.00**	**104.00**	449.00
6	(Japan) Daijiro Yoshihara	16.00	84.00	20.00	39.00	52.00	35.00	36.00	87.00	369.00
7	(Japan) Ken Gushi	64.00	18.00	51.00	67.00	34.00	68.00	36.00	19.00	357.00
8	(United States) Forrest Wang	48.00	35.00	19.00	34.00	55.00	35.00	51.00	53.00	330.00
9	(United States) Ryan Tuerck	48.00	19.00	38.00	36.00	54.00	19.00	38.00	70.00	322.00
10	(United States) Tyler McQuarrie	32.00	51.00	67.00	19.00	0.00	53.00	36.00	52.00	310.00
11	(United States) Alec Hohnadell	16.00	66.00	34.00	19.00	36.00	34.00	66.00	18.00	289.00
12	(Latvia) Kristaps Blušs	32.00	18.00	82.00	35.00	X	19.00	66.00	34.00	286.00
13	(United States) Justin Pawlak	16.00	20.00	35.00	35.00	37.00	18.00	35.00	52.00	248.00
14	(United States) Michael Essa	32.00	51.00	20.00	51.00	18.00	20.00	34.00	20.00	246.00
15	(Republic of Ireland) Dean Kearney	32.00	19.00	18.00	50.00	34.00	50.00	18.00	18.00	239.00
16	(United States) Matt Coffman	16.00	18.00	18.00	18.00	51.00	68.00	19.00	19.00	227.00
17	(United States) Chelsea DeNofa	**100.00**	19.00	3.00	21.00	36.00	18.00	18.00	1.00	216.00
18	(South Korea) Geoff Stoneback	16.00	35.00	18.00	18.00	34.00	18.00	35.00	35.00	209.00
19	(New Zealand) Mike Whiddett	32.00	35.00	18.00	0.00	18.00	19.00	51.00	34.00	207.00
20	(Finland) Juha Rintanen	16.00	34.00	34.00	18.00	18.00	18.00	18.00	50.00	206.00
21	(United States) Patrick Mordaunt	16.00	34.00	51.00	18.00	X	0.00	18.00	66.00	203.00
22	(Peru) Alex Heilbrunn	16.00	18.00	18.00	67.00	X	18.00	18.00	35.00	190.00
22	(Dominican Republic) Jhonnattan Castro	16.00	18.00	50.00	18.00	18.00	34.00	18.00	18.00	190.00
24	(Poland) Faruk Kugay	16.00	34.00	18.00	34.00	18.00	18.00	18.00	18.00	174.00
25	(Hong Kong) Charles Ng	32.00	1.00	19.00	18.00	18.00	18.00	19.00	35.00	160.00
26	(United States) Patrick Goodin	16.00	18.00	18.00	18.00	35.00	18.00	18.00	18.00	159.00
26	(United States) Kyle Mohan	16.00	18.00	34.00	18.00	19.00	18.00	18.00	18.00	159.00
28	(United States) Cameron Moore	16.00	18.00	18.00	18.00	34.00	18.00	18.00	18.00	158.00
29	(Norway) Kenneth Moen	16.00	34.00	51.00	X	X	35.00	X	18.00	154.00
30	(Japan) Robbie Nishida	16.00	X	18.00	36.00	18.00	34.00	1.00	18.00	141.00
31	(United States) Jeff Jones	32.00	35.00	18.00	18.00	X	18.00	19.00	1.00	140.00
32	(United States) Tanner Foust	X	52.00	X	X	X	51.00	18.00	X	121.00
33	(Scotland) Andrew Gray	X	18.00	18.00	18.00	19.00	18.00	18.00	X	109.00
34	(Taiwan) Shengjun Zhang	16.00	X	X	X	X	X	X	X	16.00
Pos	Driver	LBH	ATL	ORL	WTS	ASE	EVS	TEX	IRW	Points

Notes:

- X — Did not attend event

==== Manufacturer Cup ====
Pos	Manufacturer	Points
1	(Japan) Scion	933.00
2	(Japan) Nissan	748.00
3	(United States) Ford	710.00
4	(Germany) BMW	461.00
5	(Japan) Mazda	366.00
6	(United States) Chevrolet	310.00
7	(Japan) Infiniti	262.00
8	(United States) Dodge	239.00
9	(Japan) Lexus	158.00

==== Tire Cup ====
Pos	Brand	Points
1	(Japan) Falken	1096.00
2	(South Korea) Nexen	969.00
3	(South Korea) Hankook	940.00
4	(Japan) Nitto	752.00
5	(Indonesia) Achilles	706.00
6	(Singapore) GT Radial	374.00

=== Pro 2 ===
==== Standings ====
Pos	Driver	ATL	ORL	TEX	PHX	Points
1	(Canada) Marc Landreville	86.00	106.00	104.00	106.00	402.00
2	(United States) Jeff Jones	104.00	83.00	43.00	42.00	272.00
3	(United States) Andrew Lewis	43.00	62.00	65.00	22.00	192.00
4	(United States) Dirk Stratton	22.00	43.00	63.00	63.00	191.00
5	(United States) Dan Burkett	63.00	42.00	1.00	62.00	168.00
6	(United States) Ryan Litteral	65.00	23.00	23.00	43.00	154.00
7	(United States) Nate Hamilton	1.00	23.00	26.00	84.00	134.00
8	(Canada) Matt Madrigali	22.00	62.00	22.00	25.00	131.00
8	(United States) Taylor Hull	42.00	23.00	43.00	23.00	131.00
10	(United States) Trenton Beechum	23.00	22.00	83.00	0.00	128.00
11	(United States) Kevin Lawrence	22.00	45.00	22.00	22.00	111.00
12	(United States) Austin Meeks	22.00	44.00	42.00	0.00	108.00
13	(United States) Josh McGuire	23.00	22.00	22.00	22.00	89.00
14	(United States) Randall Waters	X	X	42.00	43.00	85.00
15	(United States) Donovan Brockway	1.00	22.00	22.00	22.00	67.00
16	(Singapore) Ng Sheng Nian	22.00	22.00	22.00	0.00	66.00
17	(Canada) Aaron Day	22.00	X	1.00	22.00	45.00
18	(United States) Ethan Hunter	42.00	X	1.00	0.00	43.00
18	(United States) Doug Van Den Brink	43.00	0.00	X	0.00	43.00
20	(United States) Matt VanKirk	X	X	0.00	23.00	23.00
20	(United States) Kelsey Rowlings	1.00	X	22.00	0.00	23.00
20	(Puerto Rico) Luis Lizardi	1.00	22.00	X	0.00	23.00
Pos	Driver	ATL	ORL	TEX	PHX	Points

Notes:

- X — Did not attend event
