= 2020 Formula D season =

Motorsport season

The 2020 Formula D season (officially titled Formula Drift Pro Championship) was the seventeenth season of the Formula D series. The season began on September 5 at World Wide Technology Raceway and concluded on November 22 at Toyota Speedway at Irwindale after eight events.

== Entries ==
2012 Formula D season champion Daigo Saito planned to return to the series after a four-year absence, but this never materialised.

Team	No.	Car	Tires	Driver	Round(s)
Alec Robbins Racing	35	Nissan 350Z	Achilles	(United States) Alec Robbins R	1–4, 7–8
Arclight Racing	43	Dodge Viper ZB II	Achilles	(Republic of Ireland) Dean Kearney	All
Arclight Racing	357	Chevrolet Corvette C7 Z06	Achilles	(Brazil) João Barion	1–4
Asphalt Anarchy	82	Cadillac ATS-V	Achilles	(United States) Taylor Hull	All
Bakchis Motorsports	723	Nissan Silvia S15	Falken	(Lithuania) Aurimas Bakchis	All
BUY NOW JAPAN	530	Nissan Silvia S15	Nexen	(Japan) Wataru Masuyama R	All
Drift Cave Motorsports	777	Chevrolet Corvette C6	Falken	(United States) Matt Field	All
Drift Force	91	BMW F22	Achilles	(Switzerland) Yves Meyer R	1–4
Essa Autosport	101	BMW M3 E46	Achilles	(United States) Michael Essa	All
Garagistic drift team	171	BMW M3 E36	Achilles	(United States) Rome Charpentier R	All
Huddy Racing	129	BMW M3 E46	Achilles	(United States) Dylan Hughes	All
Jeff Jones Racing	818	Nissan 370Z	Nexen; GT Radial (Note: Jones used Nexen tires for the first events at St Louis but switched to GT Radial for the remainder of the season.)	(United States) Jeff Jones	All
Jhonnattan Castro	17	Toyota GT86	Nexen	(Dominican Republic) Jhonnattan Castro	All
KGMS Toyota Racing	21	Toyota GR Supra	Achilles	(Japan) Ken Gushi	All
KORUWORKS	909	Nissan 350Z	GT Radial	(United States) Ryan Litteral	All
Kyle Mohan Racing	99	Mazda RX-8	Nexen	(United States) Kyle Mohan	5–8
LZMFG / Enjuku Racing	5	Nissan Silvia S15	Achilles	(United States) Adam LZ R	All
NOS Energy Drink Drift Team	64	Nissan 370Z; Nissan Silvia S14 (Note: Forsberg suffered an engine failure with his primary Nissan 370Z in practice for the final weekend at Irwindale. He was able to make rudimentary repairs and, having received a bye run for round 7, took the run before withdrawing from the event for safety reasons. For the finale, Matt Field lent Forsberg his backup car, a Nissan Silvia S14 with an LS engine. This marked the first time Forsberg had competed in Formula Drift without Nissan power.)	Nexen	(United States) Chris Forsberg	All
Papadakis Racing	151	Toyota GR Supra	Nitto	(Norway) Fredric Aasbø	All
Papadakis Racing	411	Toyota Corolla (E210)	Nitto	(United States) Ryan Tuerck	All
Pawlak Racing	13	Ford Mustang	Falken	(United States) Justin Pawlak	All
RAD Industries	34	Toyota Supra A80	Nexen	(United States) Dan Burkett	All
RTR Motorsports	25	Ford Mustang RTR Spec 5-D	Nitto	(United States) Vaughn Gittin, Jr.	All
RTR Motorsports	88	Ford Mustang RTR	Nitto	(United States) Chelsea DeNofa	All
Shelby American Drift Team	7	Shelby Super Snake	Nexen	(United States) Tyler Nelson R	1–6
Shelby American Drift Team	23	Shelby Super Snake; Nissan 240SX (Note: Nerren blew an engine in the closing stages of the Washington round, so used a backup Nissan 240SX at Texas Motor Speedway.)	Nexen	(United States) Jonathan Nerren R	All
Team DAI.	9	Subaru BRZ	Falken	(Japan) Daijiro Yoshihara	All
Team Faruk	53	Nissan Silvia S14	Nexen	(Turkey) (Poland) Faruk Kugay	All
Team UPGARAGE with GT Radial	123	Nissan Silvia S15	GT Radial	(Japan) Kazuya Taguchi	All
Travis Reeder Motorsports	77	Nissan 240SX	GT Radial	(United States) Travis Reeder	All

R Eligible for Rookie of the Year

== Schedule ==
An initial schedule featuring eight championship rounds was released in November 2019, but this was revised in April 2020 to a different schedule still featuring eight rounds. A final calendar was announced in June 2020 featuring four double-header rounds.

Round	Title	Circuit	Location	Date	Winner	Car
1	Crossroads	(Illinois) World Wide Technology Raceway	Madison, Illinois	September 5	(Norway) Fredric Aasbø	Toyota GR Supra
2	Crossroads	(Illinois) World Wide Technology Raceway	Madison, Illinois	September 6 (Note: The Missouri round was originally scheduled to take place on August 8, but was revised to a double-header.)	(United States) Chelsea DeNofa	Ford Mustang RTR
3	Throwdown	(Washington (state)) Evergreen Speedway	Monroe, Washington	September 26	(United States) Vaughn Gittin, Jr.	Ford Mustang RTR Spec 5-D
4	Throwdown	(Washington (state)) Evergreen Speedway	Monroe, Washington	September 27 (Note: The Seattle round was originally scheduled to take place on July 18, but was rescheduled to September 26 due to the COVID-19 pandemic. Ultimately, this was revised to a double-header.)	(United States) Vaughn Gittin, Jr.	Ford Mustang RTR Spec 5-D
5	Showdown	Texas Motor Speedway	Fort Worth, Texas	October 31	(United States) Ryan Tuerck	Toyota Corolla (E210)
6	Showdown	Texas Motor Speedway	Fort Worth, Texas	November 1 (Note: The Texas round was added to the first revised schedule in April, slated for October 17. This was later revised to a double-header, before being pushed back two weeks when Texas Motor Speedway cleared its calendar leading up to the NASCAR Cup Series race due to uncertainties over the pandemic.)	(United States) Chris Forsberg	Nissan 370Z
7	TYPE S Title Fight Weekend	(California) Irwindale Speedway	Irwindale, California	November 20	(Norway) Fredric Aasbø	Toyota GR Supra
8	TYPE S Title Fight Weekend	(California) Irwindale Speedway	Irwindale, California	November 22 (Note: The traditional Irwindale finale was originally scheduled to take place on October 17, but was rescheduled to November 21 due to the COVID-19 pandemic, with an extra round added for August 22. Ultimately, this was revised to a double-header to close the season.)	(Lithuania) Aurimas Bakchis	Nissan Silvia S15

The following rounds were included on the original calendar, but were cancelled in response to the COVID-19 pandemic:

Title	Circuit	Location	Date
Streets of Long Beach	(California) Streets of Long Beach	Long Beach, California	April 11
	(Florida) Orlando Speed World	Orlando, Florida	May 30
	(Georgia (U.S. state)) Road Atlanta	Braselton, Georgia	July 4 (Note: The Road Atlanta road was originally scheduled to take place on May 9, but was rescheduled due to the COVID-19 pandemic before ultimately being cancelled.)
	(New Jersey) Old Bridge Township Raceway Park	Englishtown, New Jersey	July 25 (Note: The Englishtown round was originally scheduled to take place on June 20, but was rescheduled due to the COVID-19 pandemic before ultimately being cancelled.)
	(California) Sonoma Raceway	Sonoma, California	September 13

== Championship standings ==
=== Scoring system ===
Formula Drift featured double-header weekends throughout 2020 in order to maintain an eight-event schedule. This compressed the schedule of each event, so traditional qualifying was scrapped and replaced by a seeding process based on, but not limited to, championship standings, similar to the 2020 NASCAR Cup Series.

For this reason, points were only awarded for the main event, which features a maximum of 32 competitors. The competitors proceed through a series of competition heats, with those eliminated in the first round (Top 32) receiving 16 points and classifying 17th through 32nd, the second round (Sweet 16) receiving 32 points and classifying 9th through 16th, and the third round (Great 8) receiving 48 points and classifying 5th through 8th. The two drivers eliminated from the fourth round (Final Four) engage in a battle for the final step on the podium, with the fourth-placed driver receiving 64 points and the third-placed driver 76 points and a trophy. In the Final, the runner-up receives 88 points and the winner 100 points.

Final classification within each round was determined by highest seeding position; for example, of the four drivers eliminated in the Great 8, the driver seeded highest going into the event is awarded 5th position.

Position	1st	2nd	3rd	4th	5th–8th	9th–16th	17th–32nd
Points	100	88	76	64	48	32	16

=== Pro Championship standings ===
Pos	Driver	WWT1	WWT2	EVS1	EVS2	TEX1	TEX2	IRW1	IRW2	Pts
1	(United States) Vaughn Gittin, Jr.	10	13	1	1	3	2	**4**	6	540
2	(United States) Chelsea DeNofa	12	1	13	4	9	3	3	2	500
3	(United States) Ryan Tuerck	2	3	11	3	1	6	10	**9**	484
4	(Norway) Fredric Aasbø	1	12	2	18	7	**5**	1	17	448
5	(United States) Chris Forsberg	4	11	9	5	**2**	1	9	10	428
6	(Lithuania) Aurimas Bakchis	3	2	12	10	11	13	18	1	408
7	(United States) Justin Pawlak	6	6	6	2	17 (Note: Pawlak suffered an engine failure in practice.)	16	19	3	372
8	(United States) Michael Essa	13	7	3	17	15	15	2	14	356
9	(United States) Jeff Jones	14	15	**17** (Note: Jones received a bye run in the Top 32 but crashed in practice. He was unable to complete the bye run, so was scored outside the Sweet 16 and the 16th position was left vacant.)	7	4	10	12	4	320
10	(United States) Taylor Hull	15	17	8	6	5	9	7	5	320
11	(Japan) Kazuya Taguchi	**5**	10	5	13	13	7	6	12	320
12	(United States) Adam LZ RY	25	25	14	**9**	6	4	5	13	288
13	(Japan) Daijiro Yoshihara	11	14	4	14	14	8	11	18	288
14	(United States) Matt Field	9	4	7	12	12	14	14	20	288
15	(United States) Dylan Hughes	7	5	10	11	18	18	20	15	240
16	(United States) Jonathan Nerren R	29	29	30	29	8	11	17	7	208
17	(Republic of Ireland) Dean Kearney	19	19	22	8	10	12	13	19	208
18	(Japan) Ken Gushi	17	8	19	20	21	21	22	8	192
19	(United States) Travis Reeder	18	16	20	21	22	22	8	11	192
20	(United States) Dan Burkett	8	**9**	18	19	20	20	16	22	192
21	(Dominican Republic) Jhonnattan Castro	20	20	23	22	16	17	15	21	160
22	(Japan) Wataru Masuyama R	26	26	15	15	19	19	21	23	160
23	(United States) Ryan Litteral	21	21	24	23	23	23	23	16	144
24	(United States) Rome Charpentier R	23	23	26	25	24	24	24	24	128
25	(Turkey) (Poland) Faruk Kugay	24	24	27	26	25	25	25	25	128
26	(United States) Alec Robbins R	16	18	21	16			27	27	128
27	(United States) Tyler Nelson R	28	28	29	28	26	26			96
28	(United States) Kyle Mohan					27	27	26	26	64
29	(Brazil) João Barion	22	22	25	24					64
30	(Switzerland) Yves Meyer R	27	27	28	27					64

**In-line notation**
**Bold**	Top seed
RY	Rookie of the Year
R	Rookie

=== Auto Cup standings ===
Auto Cup points are awarded each round to the two drivers with the highest classified finish for each manufacturer. To be eligible, both the chassis and engine must have been constructed by that manufacturer. For example, the Shelby Super Snakes entered by Tyler Nelson and Jonathan Nerren were not eligible for Ford points because their engines had been developed by Shelby American, the Nissan Silvia S15 entered by Aurimas Bakchis was not eligible because it featured a custom-built V8 engine, and the Nissan Silvia S14 entered by Chris Forsberg in the final round was not eligible for the same reason.

Pos	Manufacturer	WWT1	WWT2	EVS1	EVS2	TEX1	TEX2	IRW1	IRW2	Pts
1	(United States) Ford	6	1	1	1	3	2	3	2	1140
1	(United States) Ford	10	6	6	2	9	3	**4**	3	1140
2	(Japan) Toyota	1	3	2	3	1	**5**	1	8	980
2	(Japan) Toyota	2	8	11	18	7	6	10	**9**	980
3	(Japan) Nissan	4	10	5	5	**2**	1	6	12	716
3	(Japan) Nissan	**5**	11	9	13	13	7	9		716
4	(Germany) BMW	13	7	3	17	15	15	2	14	356
5	(United States) Chevrolet	9	4	7	12	12	14	14	20	352
5	(United States) Chevrolet	22	22	25	24					352
6	(United States) Cadillac	15	17	8	6	5	9	7	5	320
7	(United States) Dodge	19	19	22	8	10	12	13	19	208
8	(Japan) Mazda					27	27	26	26	64

=== Tire Cup Standings ===
Tire Cup points are awarded each round to the two drivers with the highest classified finish for each tire manufacturer.

Pos	Tire	WWT1	WWT2	EVS1	EVS2	TEX1	TEX2	IRW1	IRW2	Pts
1	(Japan) Nitto	1	1	1	1	1	2	1	2	1380
1	(Japan) Nitto	2	3	2	3	3	3	3	6	1380
2	(Japan) Falken	3	2	4	2	11	8	11	1	892
2	(Japan) Falken	6	4	6	10	12	13	14	3	892
3	(Indonesia) Achilles	7	5	3	6	5	4	2	5	820
3	(Indonesia) Achilles	13	7	8	8	6	9	5	8	820
4	(South Korea) Nexen	4	**9**	9	5	**2**	1	9	7	732
4	(South Korea) Nexen	8	11	15	15	8	11	15	10	732
5	(Singapore) GT Radial	**5**	10	5	7	4	7	6	4	640
5	(Singapore) GT Radial	18	16	**17**	13	13	10	8	11	640
