= Nexen =

Nexen may refer to:

- Nexen Energy, now CNOOC Petroleum North America, a Canadian oil and gas company
- Nexen Tire, a Korean tire manufacturer
- NEXEN, an online platform used by BNY
