= Chelsea DeNofa =

American Drifter and racing driver

- Nationality: United States
- Born: April 6, 1988 (age 38) Doylestown, Pennsylvania, U.S.

Formula D career
- Debut season: 2012
- Current team: RTR Motorsports
- Years active: 2012–2023
- Car number: 88
- Former teams: Chelsea DeNofa Motorsports; Bergenholtz Racing
- Wins: 10
- Podiums: 18
- Best finish: 1st in 2023

Championship titles
- 2010 2011 2023: Xtreme Drift Circuit; Xtreme Drift Circuit; Formula D

Chelsea DeNofa (born April 6, 1988) is an American racing driver and former drifter and who competed in the Formula D series, winning the championship in 2023. He has also competed in the Mustang Challenge, SCCA Pro, D1 Grand Prix USA, NOPI Drift, and Xtreme Drift Circuit racing series.

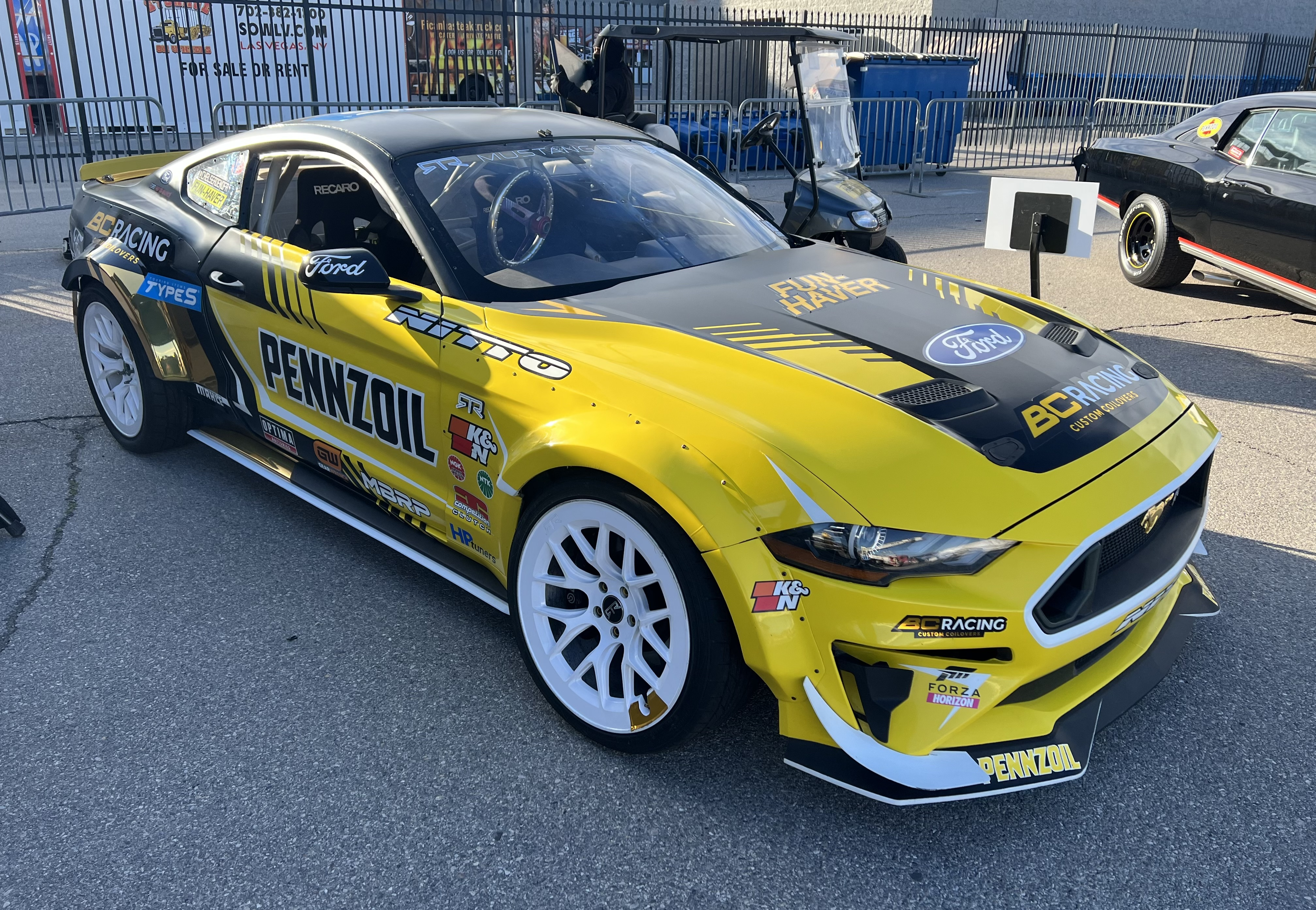
The Ford Mustang RTR Spec 5-D driven by DeNofa in his championship-winning 2023 season

DeNofa announced his retirement in 2023, two days before winning his first Formula D championship.

== Career ==
DeNofa began drifting competitively at the age of 15, first competing at a drift event in Miami which his mother had driven him to. He later completed schooling in road racing and stunt driving, eventually earning an SCCA Pro Racing license to begin competing in racing events.

Beginning in 2007, DeNofa raced in professional drift competitions such as D1 Grand Prix USA, NOPI Drift, and Xtreme Drift Circuit (XDC), frequently driving his personal BMW M3 (E36). In XDC, he won his first championship in 2010, and followed it with a consecutive championship win in 2011.

=== Formula Drift ===
With two back-to-back championship titles in XDC, DeNofa was granted the pro license to race in Formula Drift in 2012.

DeNofa finished the 2012 season in 17th place in a field of over 50 drivers in his rookie season. He began the season driving as a privateer with his E36 M3, but finished the season from Round 5 onwards driving the Nitto Tire BC Racing Mazda RX-8 with team Bergenholtz Racing. He improved to 13th place in the 2013 season, driving a BMW M3 (E46) for his own Chelsea DeNofa Motorsports team once again. The season included a fourth place finish at the season opener in Long Beach.

The 2014 season resulted in DeNofa finishing in 17th place, and finishing the 2015 season in 16th place. 2015 also marked the first year where DeNofa joined sponsor GT Radial Tires after multiple years with Nitto Tire.

DeNofa improved to record his first Formula D win at the season opener in 2016. However, after less success in later rounds, he finished in 17th place for the season.

In 2017, DeNofa announced he would be joining the RTR Motorsports team as its first second driver, alongside Vaughn Gittin Jr. This also marked a return to sponsor Nitto Tire, as well as a continuation of his longtime BC Racing sponsorship. This also marked the departure from the BMW M3 platforms he had driven for the majority of his career, to the Ford Mustang RTR. The season resulted in a 13th place finish with a season best fifth place round finish in Texas.

DeNofa improved to an 8th place finish in the 2018 season, recording two podium finishes in the updated Ford Mustang RTR. He finished again in 8th place in the 2019 season, recording a win at Round 7 in Texas and one podium finish. This was also the first season where he recorded a first place qualification position, at the season finale round in Irwindale.

The 2020 season resulted in a then-best Formula Drift career finish of 2nd place, after DeNofa scored three podium finishes and one race win during Round 2 at World Wide Technology Raceway. His teammate Gittin Jr. went on to win the championship, resulting in one-two season finish for RTR Motorsports.

DeNofa recorded a career-best three wins in the 2021 season. This included qualifying in first at the second round, while recording a win at the same event. He again qualified in first for the following third round. After his third win in Round 5, he took the championship lead, but ultimately finished the season in fourth place.

For the 2022 season, DeNofa recorded two podium finishes and a win at Round 6 at Evergreen Speedway. He also qualified in first at Round 4 at Englishtown Raceway Park. He matched the season prior and finished at fourth place in the final standings.

DeNofa won the 2023 Formula Drift Championship, after matching his career-best of three round wins and establishing a 53-point lead heading into the final round. DeNofa announced his retirement from Formula Drift two days before the season final, with the championship not yet clinched.

Since retirement, DeNofa has drifted in exhibition events such as the European Up in Smoke tour and FuelFest car festival.

=== Mustang Challenge ===
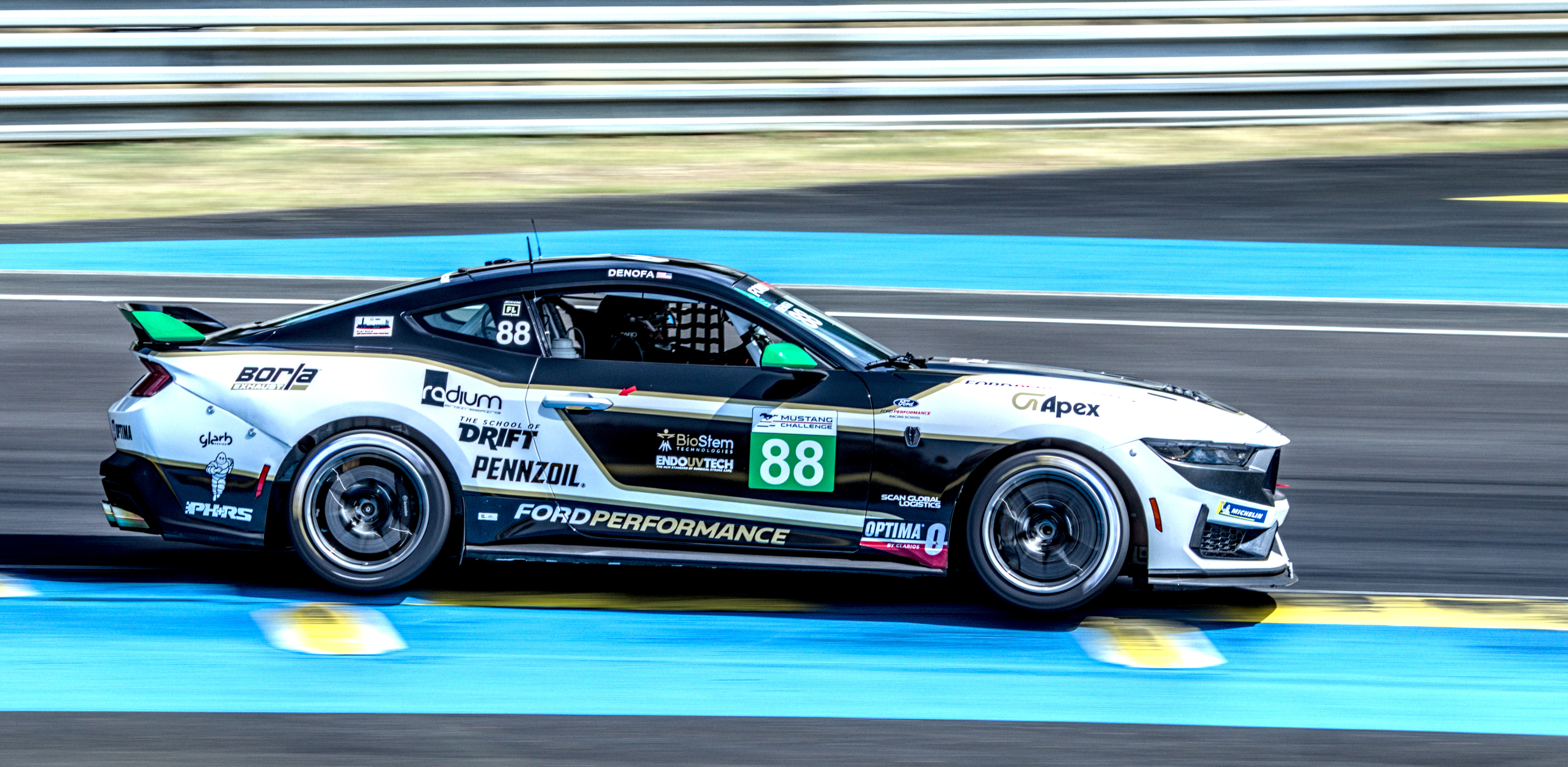
DeNofa racing in the 2025 Mustang Challenge Le Mans Invitational

As a longtime Ford Mustang driver and brand ambassador in Formula Drift, DeNofa was invited to the IMSA Ford Mustang Challenge in 2025.

This also marked a return to road racing for DeNofa, as he had initially participated in during his years before drifting.

DeNofa entered driving a one-design Mustang Dark Horse R for the series, which features a livery matching his personal Porsche 718 Cayman and twin-turbo BMW M5 drift cars.

This series includes the Mustang Challenge Le Mans Invitational, a support race for the 24 Hours of Le Mans. To prepare for the Le Mans Invitational, DeNofa recorded a pair of rounds at Sebring International Raceway, where he finished seventh overall in the top Dark Horse class.

At the Le Mans Invitational across two races for the event, DeNofa won first place in the Dark Horse Stars class, and recorded a 13th place finish overall.

== Personal life ==
DeNofa's wife also shares the same name after marriage, Chelsea DeNofa. The couple were married in March 2020.
