= Calumet, Inc. =

American manufacturing company

- Type: Public
- Traded as: Nasdaq: CLMT
- Industry: Manufacturing and refining
- Founded: 1919; 107 years ago
- Headquarters: Indianapolis, Indiana, U.S.
- Products: Oil and solvents
- Revenue: ▼US$4.14 billion (2025)
- Net income: ▲ −US$33.8 million (2025)
- Website: www.calumetspecialty.com

Calumet, Inc. is an American publicly traded company that was incorporated in 1919. It specializes in the manufacture of lubricating oils, solvents, waxes, packaged and synthetic specialty products, fuels and fuel-related products. The company operates 12 production, blending, and packaging facilities across North America. This includes locations in Princeton, Cotton Valley, and Shreveport, Louisiana; Burnham, Illinois; Dickinson, Texas; Muncie, Indiana; Karns City, Pennsylvania; and Great Falls, Montana. Calumet's specialized hydrocarbon products are distributed around the world to approximately 2,700 global customers.

== Products ==
Calumet, Inc. is a producer of specialty hydrocarbon products. The company processes crude oil and other feedstocks into a wide variety of customized lubricating oils, solvents, waxes, synthetic lubricants, and other products. Calumet's specialty products are sold to domestic and international customers who purchase them primarily as raw material components for various industrial and consumer applications. Calumet also blends, packages, and markets specialty products through their Royal Purple, Bel-Ray, and TruFuel brands. Calumet's fuel products segment processes crude oil into a variety of fuel and fuel-related products, including gasoline, diesel, jet fuel, asphalt, and others, and occasionally resells purchased crude oil to third-party customers. Calumet's portfolio includes:

Base Oils, which are refined from crude oil and used in a wide variety of end-use products, such as adhesives, paints and coatings, and lubricants. Calumet makes numerous naphthenic and paraffinic oil products.

Solvents from Calumet are used for a large number of applications, such as adhesives, water treatment facilities, paints and coatings, aluminum rolling and printing ink.

Polyol Esters are used for high-performance lubrication applications, including in the aviation and automotive industries. Calumet specializes in synthetic polyol esters.

Gelled Hydrocarbons are essentially highly refined hydrocarbon products that are thickened into a gel using special polymer additives. The thickness varies according to which and how much polymer is introduced. Gelled hydrocarbons are used extensively in the cosmetics industry as thickeners for, among other products, lotions, shampoos and lip glosses.

Petrolatums are semisolid compounds used in cosmetics such as skin conditioners and moisturizers. Its water repellent qualities make it ideal for sealing in moisture.

White Mineral Oils are used as a base emollient, lubricant, release agent, binder, or excipient in numerous product applications.

Waxes produced by Calumet include fully refined paraffin waxes, scale wax, slack wax, soft wax, unfinished and finished petrolatum, and microcrystalline waxes that are used for a wide variety of applications, including candles, boxboard saturation and coating, hot melt adhesives, and rubber and PVC processing. The company is one of the last remaining North American producers of these products.

Renewable Diesel products will be available from Calumet's Montana Renewables business beginning in 2022. These products, including diesel, gasoline and aviation fuel, are produced from renewable feedstocks such as oil seed crops and food waste byproducts.

Finished Lubricants and Chemicals are sold through Calumet's retail brands, including Royal Purple, Bel-Ray, and TruFuel.

Fuels including gasoline, diesel, and jet fuel.

Asphalt is produced at three different Calumet facilities, and is used for everything from road construction and repair to the production of roofing shingles.

== Brands ==
Headquartered in Indianapolis, Indiana, Calumet, Inc. employs approximately 1,500 workers in North America. Calumet products are available in more than 90 countries, serving more than 3,000 corporate clients. Its products can be found under several brand names including, Bel-Ray, Orchex, Penreco, Royal Purple, TitanWax, and TruFuel.

Bel-Ray offers lubricants for (among others) the aerospace, automotive, steel, mining and textile industries. It also produces lubricants for motorcycles, ATVs, UTVs and other power sports vehicles.

Orchex offers a line of U.S. EPA-registered agricultural spray oils for use on a wide variety of farming applications including tree crops, row crops, and vegetables to combat insects, diseases, and weeds.

Penreco specializes in compounds made from gelled hydrocarbons, petrolatums and white mineral oils, which are used by the company's customers in myriad industrial and consumer applications. Its products include a special oil to suppress dust in grain processing facilities; lubricants for industrial bakery baking forms; and gels formulated for craft candle making.

Royal Purple focuses exclusively on the development and manufacture of their own proprietary line of synthetic and mineral-based lubricants for consumer, industrial and commercial uses.

TruFuel manufactures ready-to-use fuel specifically formulated for outdoor power equipment.

== History ==
1919 Calumet Refining Company formed

1953 Princeton, Louisiana refinery constructed

1990 Corporate headquarters moved to Indianapolis

1995 Calumet purchased Kerr-McGee Corp. refinery in Cotton Valley, Louisiana

2006 Calumet listed on NASDAQ, becomes publicly traded company

2008 Calumet acquired Penreco

2012 Calumet acquired numerous companies, including Montana Refining Company; Royal Purple; and TruSouth Oil

2013 Among other acquisitions and developments, Calumet acquired Bel-Ray and broke ground on Dakota Prairie Refining, the first greenfield hydrocarbon processing facility built in the United States since 1976

2014 Listed in the Fortune 500 for the first time

2017 Sold its refinery in Superior, Wisconsin to Husky Energy

2020 Expanded specialty wax business with acquisition of Paralogics

2022 Montana Renewables joins Calumet family

2024 Calumet converts from the MLP structure to a C-Corp
