= Royal Purple (lubricant manufacturer) =

American manufacturer of lubricants

Royal Purple, Inc.
- Type: Private
- Industry: Oil and chemical
- Founded: 1986
- Founder: John Williams
- Headquarters: Porter, Texas, United States
- Area served: Australia, Canada, China, Italy, Japan, Mexico, United Kingdom, United States
- Products: synthetic motor oil, synthetic grease, oil filters, gear oil
- Parent: Calumet Specialty Products Partners
- Divisions: Royal Purple Consumer Products, Royal Purple Industrial Products
- Website: royalpurple.com

Royal Purple is an American manufacturer which produces lubricants for automotive, industrial, marine, and racing use. It is known primarily for its line of synthetic Royal Purple Motor Oil products used in gasoline and diesel engines. They also produce other fluids including gear oil, transmission fluid, power steering fluid and industrial gear, bearing, engine, and hydraulic oil. Other products include chassis and bearing grease, lubricant aerosol, aerosol chain lubricant, and firearm lubricant.

== History ==
The company was founded in 1986 by John Williams, a synthetic oil developer and later consultant. Due to a customer who said he had never seen purple oil, Williams named the product Royal Purple. Producing synthetic oil using its own additives, the company grew and in 2004 completed a 125,000 square foot production facility in Porter, Texas. That same year they acquired a US federal trademark for the exclusive use of purple containers for lubricants. In 2011 Royal Purple had an annual income of 109.5 million dollars, and in 2012 was sold in over 25,000 outlets worldwide. In July 2012 Royal purple got a new owner when it was sold for 335 million dollars to Calumet Lubricants and is now part of their Branded Products Division.

== Media ==
In 2010 Royal Purple cooperated with DJ Funkmaster Flex to promote its products. Royal Purple announced on September 25, 2013 that it would sponsor the Las Vegas Bowl for three years, from 2013 to 2016. The deal is worth more than one million dollars a year. Royal Purple is the official lubricant for Lingenfelter Performance Engineering. And has partnered with many other organizations such as GRC and Rally Cross.
