= Vaughn Gittin Jr. =

American Drifter and racing driver

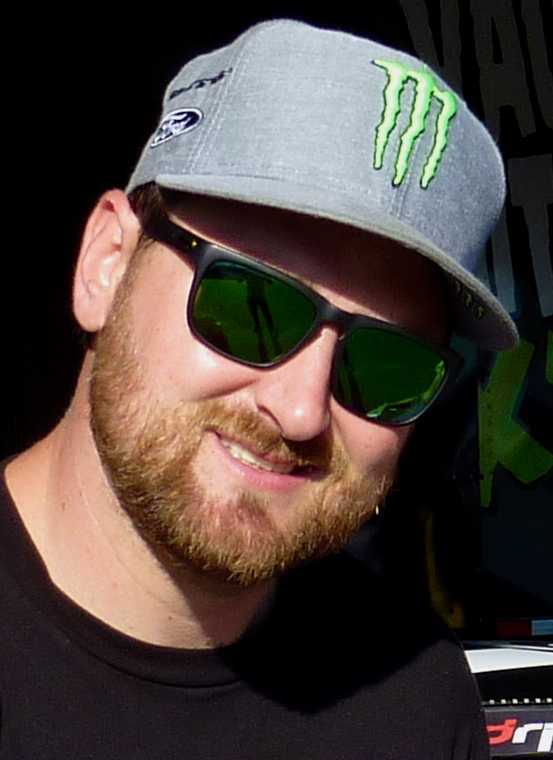
- Gittin in 2013
- Nationality: United States
- Born: Vaughn Donald Gittin Jr. September 20, 1980 (age 46) Baltimore, Maryland, U.S.

Formula D career
- Debut season: 2004
- Current team: RTR Motorsports
- Car number: 25
- Former teams: Falken Tire
- Wins: 13
- Best finish: 1st in 2010, 2020

Championship titles
- 2010 2020: Formula D Formula D

Vaughn Donald Gittin Jr. (born September 20, 1980) is an American drifter, racing driver, and founder of RTR Vehicles. He has competed in the Formula D series, winning the championship in 2010 and 2020, as well as in the D1 Grand Prix, Ultra4 USA, and NASCAR Canada racing series. Gittin is the owner and founder of the RTR Vehicles company and RTR Motorsports team, which has often collaborated with and been sponsored by Ford and Monster Energy.

Gittin is credited with popularizing the use of American cars, specifically the Ford Mustang, in drifting competition where the field formerly only consisted of turbocharged Japanese import vehicles.

== Career ==
=== Formula Drift ===
Gittin began racing in Formula D in the inaugural 2004 season, driving a self-built Nissan 240SX (S13), with sponsor Falken Tire. He quit his job in information technology, and began pursuing drifting full-time. In 2005, he began driving for Team Falken in a Ford Mustang GT (S197). He finished in fourth place for the 2006 season.

In 2010, Gittin announced he would be partnering with Monster Energy as his title sponsor. Gittin won his first Formula Drift title in 2010, with 2 event wins.

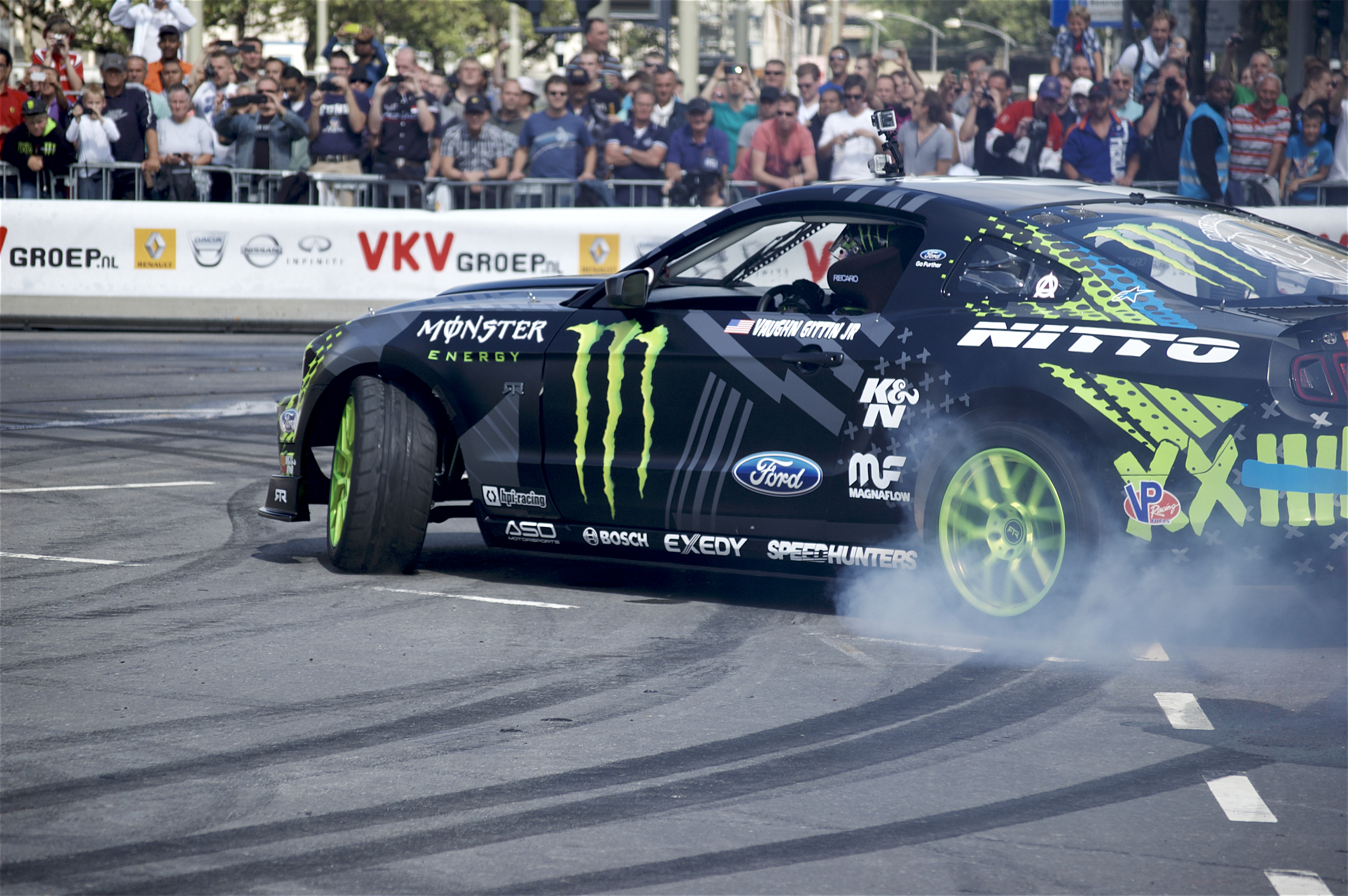
Gittin drifting in 2013

For 2013, Gittin formally announced the launch of his own RTR Drift Team. He retained Monster Energy as his title sponsor, but this marked his departure from longtime tire sponsor and team partner Falken Tire to new sponsor Nitto Tire. Gittin was awarded the Ace Driver of the Decade title in 2013 to recognize an impressive competition record that saw him take more tandem battle victories than any other driver in ten years of Formula Drift history.

Gittin finished third in the Formula Drift Championship for the 2016 season, after securing two victories in the season. He also finished fourth in the 2017 season after campaigning a brand-new engine program and two-car team.

Ten years after his first championship win, Gittin won the 2020 championship, with a season that included two wins and two podium finishes.

Gittin stepped back from Formula Drift after the 2021 season, with Adam LZ taking his place in the RTR Racing team lineup alongside Chelsea DeNofa. He returned in 2023 in a part-time capacity, driving for half the season and sharing a car with LZ. He scored an event win at Round 2.

=== D1 Grand Prix ===
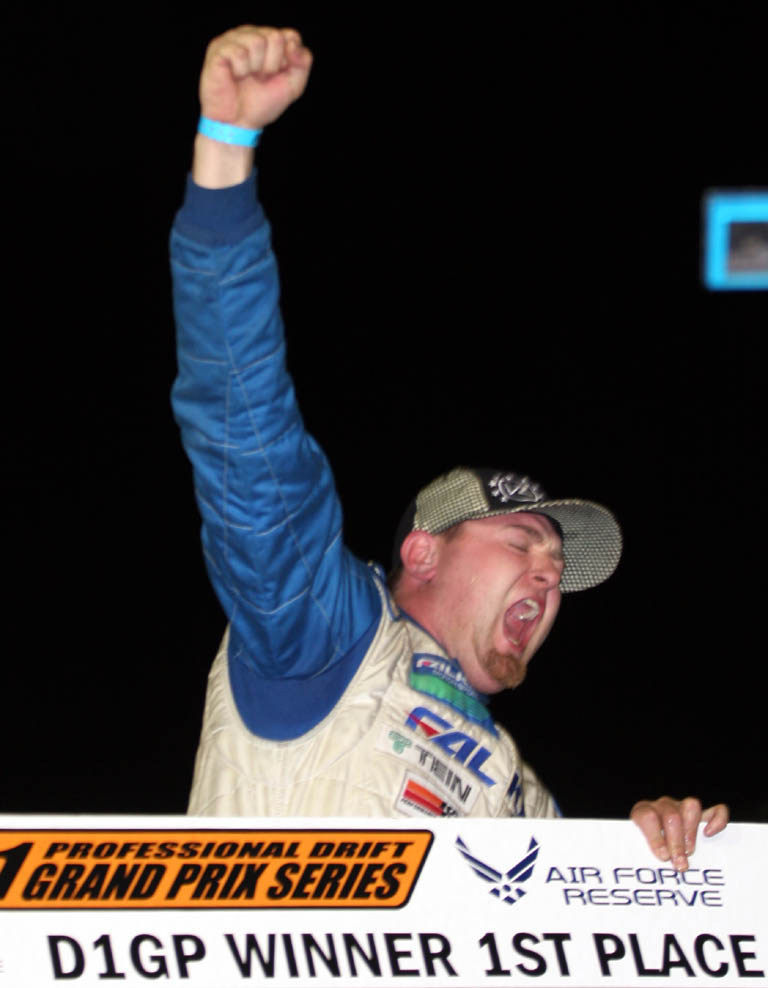
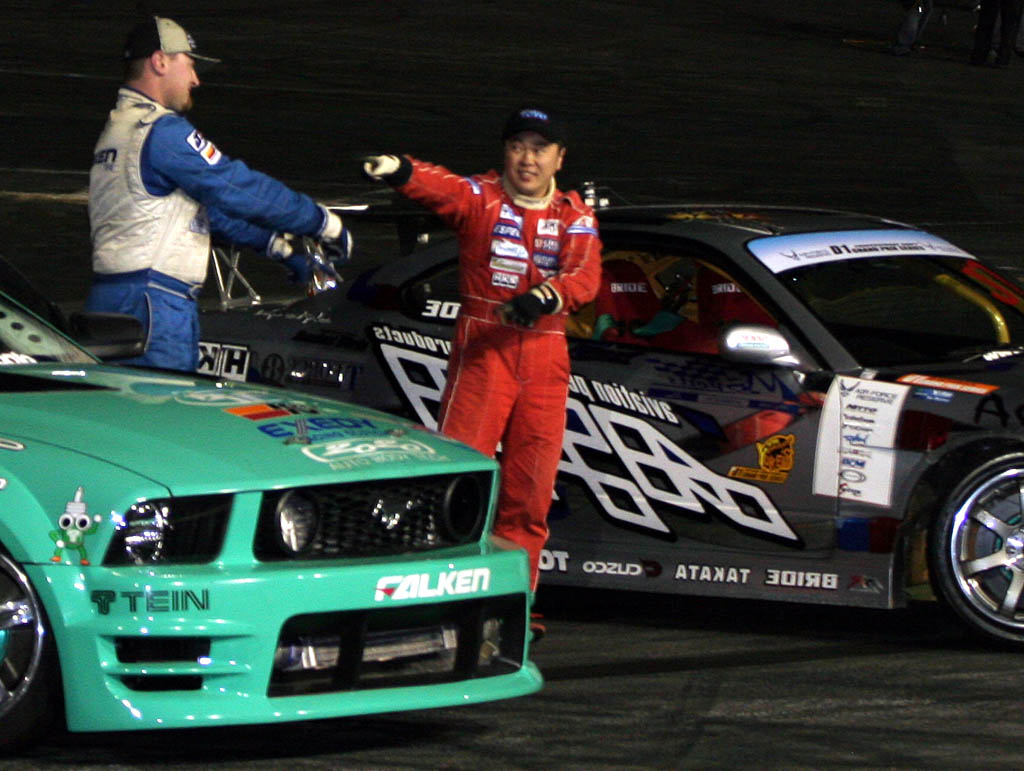
Gittin after winning the 2007 D1GP All Star Duel

Gittin also competed in the D1 Grand Prix All Star exhibition matches from 2004 to 2007. He won the USA vs Japan event in 2005, and the All Star Duel event in 2007, and became the first drifter from outside Japan to win a D1 Grand Prix event.

=== Ultra4 Racing ===
In 2016, Gittin began competing in the Ultra4 USA racing series at the King of the Hammers. He went on to finish in the top-ten in his first appearance. In 2018, he won the East Coast Championship in the Ultra4 4500 Class. He finished in seventh place in the highest 4400 class in 2019, the highest finish of any crossover driver in series history.

=== NASCAR Canada ===
For 2014 and 2015, Gittin competed in NASCAR Canada. He finished 14th out of 32 drivers in Québec in 2014, and he also finished in fifth place during his first Trans-Am race at Road America in 2015.

=== Gymkhana Grid ===
Gittin appeared as a guest driver alongside event creator and fellow Monster Energy teammate Ken Block in his Gymkhana Grid event, from 2010 to 2012. The gymkhana exhibition event featured drift stunts, pyrotechnics, and obstacles such as barrels, tires, ship containers and tanks.

== Other ventures ==
=== RTR Vehicles ===
Gittin started RTR Vehicles in 2009, with RTR being an acronym for "Ready To Rock". RTR first announced the launch of a collaborative special edition of the Ford Mustang entitled the Mustang RTR-C to be revealed at 2009 SEMA Show, and limited in production to ten vehicles. Throughout the years, RTR has created aftermarket accessories, customization packages, and third-party special models for the Ford Mustang. This continued until 2025, when an official Ford Mustang RTR production model was announced in partnership with Ford, and later in 2026, a Ford Bronco RTR production model.

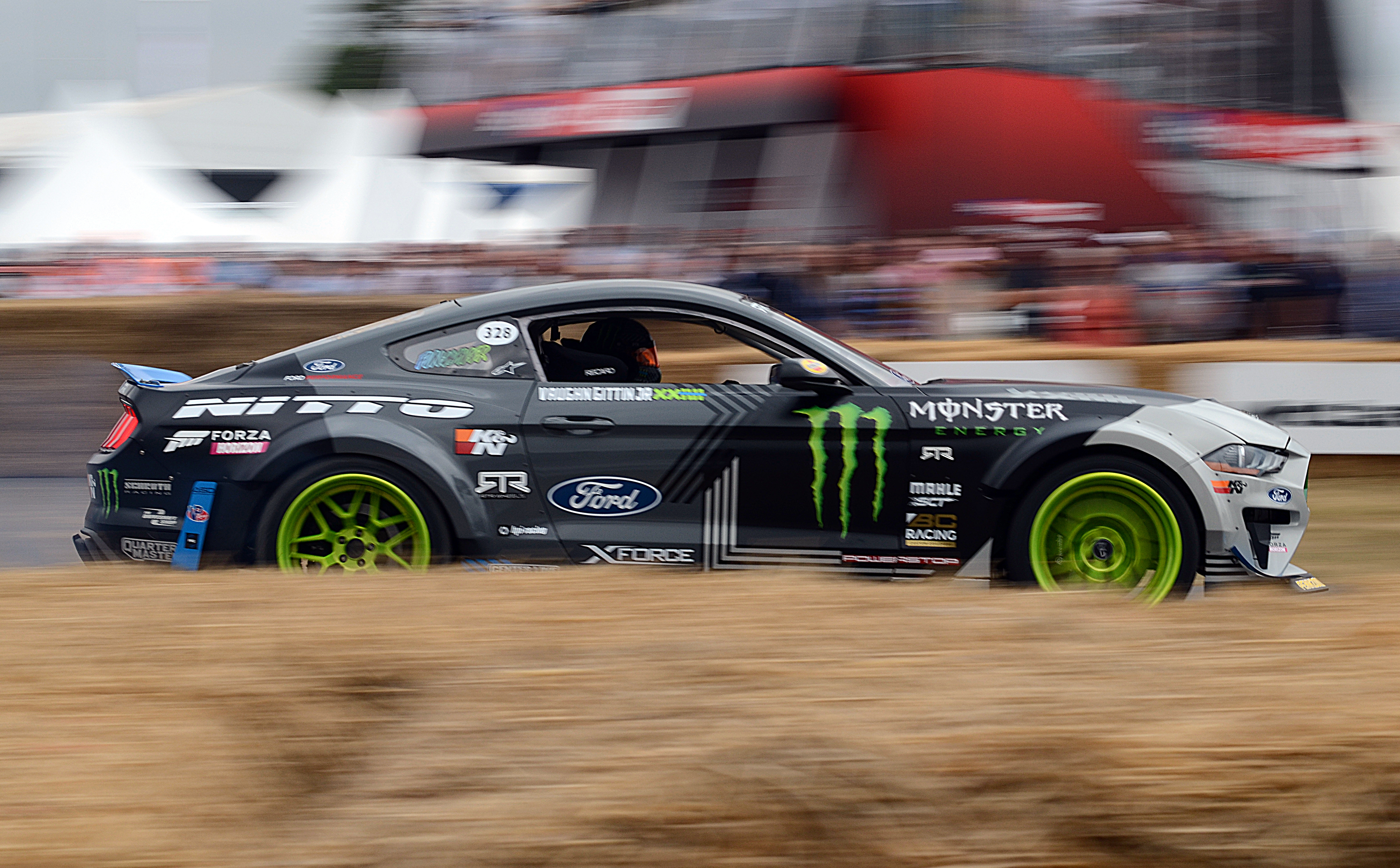
Gittin driving his Ford Mustang RTR Spec 5-D at the 2018 Goodwood Festival of Speed

Gittin stated the purpose of launching the RTR brand in 2009 was to reinvigorate interest in the Ford Mustang for the younger generation, whose primary clientele was an aging demographic. Noting the interest in low-displacement, high-boost imports, Gittin and Ford reasoned that the drifter's influence could help market the Mustang in a new way.

In 2023, Ford partnered with Gittin and RTR Vehicles to develop a "Drift Brake" feature for the seventh-generation Mustang. In lieu of a traditional hand brake actuated by a physical cable, this electronic parking brake in the Mustang's Performance Package can override the stability-controlled controller to lock the rear brakes with hydraulic line pressure.

=== In popular culture ===
Gittin has appeared in multiple ad campaigns and viral video stunts for Ford and Monster Energy, such as the "Fire Drift" video, "Battle Drift" video with Daigo Saito, and "Drift King of the Ring" video drifting on the Nürburgring race track.

Gittin appears in the racing video game Shift 2: Unleashed, as a character who guides the player through their career and teaches the player how to drift. He is also one of the rivals that the player has to beat in two career branches, "Drift" and "Muscle".

Gittin also appears, in a smaller capacity, in the 2015 reboot of Need For Speed alongside fellow Monster Energy driver Ken Block for the "Style" portion of its storyline.
