= Federal Corporation =

Taiwanese tyre manufacturer

Federal Corporation 泰豐輪胎股份有限公司
- Company type: Public (TWSE: 2101)
- Industry: Automotive
- Founded: 1954; 72 years ago
- Founder: Ma Chi San
- Headquarters: Zhongli, Taoyuan City, Taiwan
- Key people: Ma Shao Jinn, Chairman, Shu Jam Ma, CEO
- Products: Tires
- Operating income: ▲NT$8.8 bln.(2007)
- Number of employees: 2100 (2008)
- Subsidiaries: Federex International; JiangXi Federal Tire; Highpoint Trading Ltd. Ta Shin Development Co.
- Website: www.federalcorporation.com

Federal Corporation (Chinese: 泰豐輪胎; pinyin: Tàifēng Lúntāi) is a Taiwan-based tire manufacturer, headquartered in Zhongli District, Taoyuan City Taiwan. Today, it operates under the name of Federal Group which includes marketing, real estate divisions, and two tire manufacturing plants: original plant in Zhongli, Taiwan and 100% owned plant in China, Jiangxi, Nanchang (acquired in 1997).

The company has two major brands: Federal Tires and Hero Tires. The Federal brand is aimed at positioning on global market, and Hero is mostly targeted to the internal market of mainland China.

== Milestones ==
Federal Corporation Office Building

- Federal Corporation was founded in Taiwan, Jhongli in 1954 as a rubber company, producing its first tire in 1958. Initial tire exports commenced in 1965.
- Technical cooperation with Bridgestone Tire Co. Ltd. began in 1960 and lasted for almost 20 years. From 1981 to 2000, the company switched to technical cooperation with Sumitomo Rubber Industries, Ltd. (a.k.a. Dunlop Tire Japan) which has given Federal the necessary technical capabilities and know-how to produce our own brand tires today.
- First passenger radial tire (PCR) production was commenced in 1978. And in 1979 company shares listed publicly (IPO) offering significant increases in operation capital.
- Federal Tires received Quality A Supplier Award in 1986, FORD Q1 Award in 1990 from Ford Motor Company, and GM/Opel Award for contribution in Opel Astra project from General Motors Corporation in 1990. Honda also issued a Quality award in 1993.

Federal Tires Logo

== Federal Tires ==
Federal Tires is a major brand of Taiwan-based Federal Corporation. Brand is widely known worldwide, especially in the US, Japan, and Australia, for its motorsports and racing designed products. Federal brand is also warmly accepted by drifters worldwide for reasonable price, outstanding performance, and high reliability. From 2012 to 2019, Federal was the spec tire for Legends Cars, although Continental AG took over in 2020.

Federal Tires offer a wide range of tires, including winter series, light truck, commercial truck tires and its major product - passenger car tires ranging from passenger/touring class to fitting performance & super-cars UHP tires.

== Hero Tires ==
The Hero Tires brandname is a secondary brand of Federal Corporation, most of JFT produced tires resemble Federal branded tires in designation. Recently the company started implementing new strategy of promoting Hero worldwide as an Asian tire brand.

== Marketing ==
The company is an active promoter of drifting, time attack, circuit racing and rallying worldwide, with most activities in the UK, US, Japan and Australia, actively being sponsors to different racing teams, drivers, and events.

== See also ==
- List of companies of Taiwan
- List of tire companies
