= João Barion =

Brazilian racing driver

João Barion (born April 14, 1987) is a Brazilian race car driver. Barion started his career in karting at the age of nine, continuing in karts until 2003 when he landed a seat at South American Formula Three team Amir Nasr Racing. In 2004 he moved to the Avallone team, before joining the Piquet team for 2005.

In 2019, Barion participated in the Netflix driving competition series Hyperdrive. He managed to get to the finals, but couldn't continue due to his custom 1965 Ford Mustang water leaking from the radiator.

== Personal life ==
=== Trajectory In Business ===
Barion is currently a shareholder of the company BRICS that works with entrepreneurship, investing on innovative and sustainable businesses. His trajectory in business started yet in the days of racing, where he began lecturing, achieving a total audience of more than 47.000 people. In 2006, his first job was at UNIVEM JR, a consulting firm, where he was responsible for attracting new partners and develop new projects. From 2007 to 2009, Barion worked in the company of his family Dori Alimentos. After this period Barion left the family Business and started a new journey searching for new opportunities and business. His first own business was a company of electric skateboards.

=== Education ===
In 2006, Barion moved from the races to the Business World. He started his studies in Business and got his degree in 2010 at Universidade Anhembi Morumbi. After graduating in business, Barion attended several courses in various areas and institutions. On the last year (2011) attended a course in Business Communication at Harvard University and Psychology, Project Management, Competitive Strategy for dynamic environments at Boston University.

=== Social Actions ===
During the period of racing, Barion has participated in various social projects, being lecturer of the project “8 ways to change the world” conducted by the UN (United Nations) in various countries. The other projects were: - Project Joao Barion safety in traffic; - project “Mangueira Cidadã”, held at the Mangueira slum in the city of Rio de Janeiro, Brazil; - Motivational speaker for the project “Viva Feliz sem Acidentes “ (Live Happy No Accident) considered one of the best projects aimed at reducing accidents in Brazil.
