= Taylor Hull =

American racing driver

- Born: Senoia, Georgia, U.S.

CARS Pro Late Model Tour career
- Debut season: 2025
- Years active: 2025–present
- Starts: 9
- Championships: 0
- Wins: 0
- Poles: 0
- Best finish: 17th in 2025
- Statistics up to date as of September 14, 2026.

Taylor Hull (birth date unknown) is an American professional auto racing driver. He currently competes in the zMAX CARS Tour, driving the No. 82 Chevrolet for Asphalt Anarchy.

Hull first started competing in asphalt racing in 2003, where he won multiple win and national championships. In 2013, he made the transition to drifting and got his Pro license the following year after spending the previous two years in the Pro 2 division. Afterwards, he competed in Formula D, where he ran from 2017 to 2024, primarily driving for Asphalt Anarchy. He had a best points finish of tenth in 2020.

Since 2023, Hull has also competed in Pro Late Models, and has competed in series such as the IHRA Stock Car Series, the Show Me The Money Pro Late Model Series, and the South Atlantic Pro Series.

On October 12, 2026, Hull was involved in an incident at a Klutch Kickers drifting event, during which he collided with fellow driver Huey Carney's vehicle in retaliation for an earlier on-track incident. Hull subsequently addressed the collision in a video posted to his Facebook account, acknowledging that his actions were deliberate and issuing an apology. He stated, "That pissed me off, so I gassed it up, and I bumped him. Should I have done that? No." On October 15, Klutch Kickers announced their ruling; disqualifying Hull from the event, banning him for 12 months, and putting him on probation for 3 years.

Taylor Hull Livery on Formula Drift with Yellow Speed Racing

Sponsors (Past + Present)
Company	Sponsored Item	Year
Yellow Speed Racing USA	Yellow Speed Racing Dynamic Pro Drift Coilovers	
COMP Cams		
Edel Brock USA		
Konig Wheels	Wheels	
Advanced Klutch		
Fuel Tech USA		
Kenda Tire	Drift Tires	
Radium Engineering		
Anti-gravity Batteries		

== Motorsports results ==
=== CARS Pro Late Model Tour ===
(key)

CARS Pro Late Model Tour results
Year	Team	No.	Make	1	2	3	4	5	6	7	8	9	10	11	12	13	CPLMTC	Pts	Ref
2025	Asphalt Anarchy	82	Chevy	AAS	CDL; DNQ	OCS; 12	ACE	NWS	CRW	HCY; 16	HCY	AND; 17	FLC	SBO	TCM; 6	NWS; 20	17th	144	
2026	Asphalt Anarchy	82	Chevy	SNM; 18	NSV; 25	CRW; Wth	ACE; 24	NWS	HCY	AND; 8	FLC	TCM	NPS	SBO			23rd	93	

=== IHRA Pro Late Model Series ===
(key) (Bold – Pole position awarded by qualifying time. Italics – Pole position earned by points standings or practice time. * – Most laps led. ** – All laps led.)

IHRA Pro Late Model Series
Year	Team	No.	Make	1	2	3	ISCSS	Pts	Ref
2026	Asphalt Anarchy	82	Chevy	DUB; 6	CDL; 11	AND; 15	6th	109	
