= Michael Essa =

American Drifter and racing driver

- Nationality: United States
- Born: Los Angeles, California, U.S.

Formula D career
- Debut season: 2009
- Current team: Essa Autosport
- Car number: 101
- Wins: 2
- Best finish: 1st in 2013

Championship titles
- 2013: Formula D

Michael Essa is an American drifter and racing driver who competed in the Formula D series, winning the championship in 2013 in a BMW M3.

== Career ==
Essa started his career in autocross racing at the age of 16. He has also worked as a precision driver and advisor for the entertainment industry.

In 2009, Essa joined the Formula D drifting series roster. He has driven a variety of different cars in his drift career, including a Mazda RX-7, BMW E92 M3, BMW Z4 and a BMW E46 M3. He has won a championship and became the first privateer to become a Formula Drift Champion. In the 2015 season, Essa switched to a Chevrolet Camaro. Essa then switched back to a BMW E46 M3 for 2016 onwards.

In January 2023, Essa officially announced his departure from Formula D after 14 years. Since then, he has become a part of Daily Driven Exotics YouTube channel, where he applies his skills and expertise on various projects such as rebuilding a modified McLaren 720S and applying custom modifications to Ferrari F12.
