= Giti Tire =

Tire company

- Type: Private
- Industry: Tire manufacturing
- Founded: 1951
- Area served: More than 130 countries
- Key people: Enki Tan (Executive chairman); Lei Huai Chin (Managing director)
- Revenue: 924,000,000 United States dollar
- Number of employees: More than 28,000 (2025)

Giti Tire (pronunciation: JEE-tee) is an Indonesian tire company, headquartered in Singapore, with more than 32,000 employees globally. The company has eight manufacturing facilities, with distribution to more than 130 countries. Giti Tire manufactures a variety of brands of passenger car, truck/bus, and off-road tires for global markets, including the brands Giti, GT Radial, Primewell, Runway, and Dextero. The company has regional offices in United States, Canada, UK, Germany, France, Indonesia, China, UAE, Malaysia, and Singapore.

In 2022, Giti was ranked as the tenth-largest tire manufacturing company in the world, based on revenue.

== History ==
Giti Tire has its roots in Gajah Tunggal, which was founded as "Fotaixing" in 1951 in Jakarta by members of the Lim family, a Chinese Indonesian business family. In 1961, the company was renamed PT Gajah Tunggal. The company entered China in 1993 and established a joint venture with Anhui Tire Factory, an independent third party, for the production of bias tires. In 1998, Giti established proprietary sales and distribution centres in various locations, completing manufacturing facilities in Fujian two years later to serve new passenger car tire (PCR) production. Since then, the company has expanded further internationally, opening offices and distribution centres around the world. In 2010, the company adopted a new Lippincott-designed logo featuring an elephant.

In June 2014, the company announced plans to build a US$560 million production plant in Richburg, South Carolina (in the Charlotte metropolitan area), USA, its first factory outside Asia. The plant opened in October 2017.

As of 2026, Giti Tire reportedly operates research and development centres in the US, Germany, the UK, Indonesia, and China. Giti Tires reported in 2026 that its five manufacturing facilities have the capacity to produce over 100 million tires annually.

== Motorsports ==
Giti sponsors motorsports drivers and events under the Giti and GT Radial brands. Included among these are being the tire sponsor for many Motorsports events in Asia and Europe, including the F3 Asian Championship. Other events that Giti Tires have been affiliated with or provided sponsorship for have included the VW Beetle Fun Cup and British Truck Racing Championship in the UK, the Formula Regional Middle East Championship, and Nobuhiro Tajima.

In 2017, Giti Tire debuted at the 24 Hours Nürburgring Race in Germany, qualifying 1st in the SP8 class, and placing 2nd in its class after a final race mechanical issue on the transmission. In 2019, the company recorded its strongest result to date, with a first and second-place finish in the SP8 class at the 24 Hours Nürburgring. In addition, Giti's Angels' team of all-female drivers, technicians, and coaches achieved a first-class finish in their group at the final VLN race in 2019.
