= Ken Gushi =

Japanese racing driver

- Born: Kenshiro Gushi; September 19, 1986 (age 40) Okinawa, Japan
- Relatives: Tsukasa Gushi, Kyomi Gushi, Shinyu Gushi

D1 Grand Prix, Formula D career
- Debut season: 2002
- Car number: 5

Kenshiro Gushi (具志健士郎, Gushi Kenshiro; born September 19, 1986) is one of Japan's top competitors in the sport of drifting. Born in Okinawa, Japan but raised in San Gabriel, California, he was taught by his father Tsukasa Gushi at the age of 13 with a Toyota AE86. Ken has become the youngest competitor in both the D1 Grand Prix of Japan and the Formula Drift Championships of the U.S. when he was 16, despite not passing his driving test at the time.

== Racing career ==
Gushi reached #1 qualified, but lost at top 16 tandems, in 2004 Formula Drift Championship very first round at Road Atlanta.

A few weeks after Road Atlanta, Gushi won the $10,000.00 Winner-Take All International Drifting Shoot-Out at the Road & Track U.S. Sports Car Invitational (30 April 2004 - 2 May 2004), part of the Mazda and Yokohama-sponsored event at Mazda Raceway Laguna Seca. Here at this famous race course, it hosted its first ever professional drifting competition, where 14 teams/drivers competed for the right to take home a $10,000 cash prize, the largest jackpot in drifting history in the U.S.

Gushi, piloting Rotora's Nissan 240SX took top honors as he defeated Japanese Pro D1 driver Kazu Hayashida of RS-R in the best eight, before eliminating Samuel Hübinette with Team Mopar/Lateral G Racing 500+ horsepower Dodge Viper in the semi-finals en route to the finals against Rhys Millen with Team RMR's Pontiac GTO. Seventeen-year-old Ken Gushi, the youngest competing driver in D1 Grand Prix history bested Rhys Millen with a series of consistent bumper to bumper tandem drifting runs.

Finishing the 2004 Formula Drift season with his Nissan 240SX, Gushi jumped into the Ford Racing backed Mustang GT in the 2005 series, finishing off the year in third place overall, and winning the third round of the season in Houston, Texas to become Formula D's first Japanese-born event winner.

In 2007, following his father's dreams, Gushi took on the challenge to race at the Pikes Peak International Hill Climb. Though he had qualified third place in the Pike's Peak Open class, Gushi miscalculated a corner, taking the car off course.

Also in 2007, Gushi participated in the Forza Motorsport Showdown piloting the Royal Purple Team 350Z.

In 2008, Gushi was picked up by Scion Racing and RS-R to pilot the first ever RWD converted Scion tC. This was done by using the Toyota Avensis chassis (which the Scion tC is based on and is originally an AWD platform) and first ever converted it into a RWD car.

In 2009, Gushi got second place at Sonoma. He ended up finishing tenth.

In 2010, Gushi finished 15th.

On April 16, 2011, Gushi took first place in the 35th annual Toyota Pro Celebrity Race at the Long Beach Grand Prix. He joined fellow Scion Racing driver, Christian Rado in the track modified tCs for the ten laps of competition. Gushi finished in first place for the Pro category and second overall behind actor William Fichtner.

In June 2011, Gushi took third place in the Formula Drift Asia at Singapore.

In 2011, Gushi finished 14th in the 2010 Scion Racing tC.

For the 2012 Formula Drift season, Gushi drove the 2013 GPP Scion Racing FR-S w/ Hankook tires. In the FR-S, he achieved a fourth-place finish at Round 5: Seattle.

Gushi has continued to compete in Formula Drift in the years since, driving Toyota-based vehicles including the Toyota GR Supra and, more recently, the Toyota GR86, as a driver for Toyota/Gazoo Racing. He has also competed in Formula Drift Japan.

== Personal life ==
Gushi attended St. Stephens School in Monterey Park, California. He attended Gabrielino High School in San Gabriel, California and Don Bosco Technical Institute in Rosemead, California.
