= Nexen Tire =

South Korean tire manufacturer

Nexen Tire Corporation

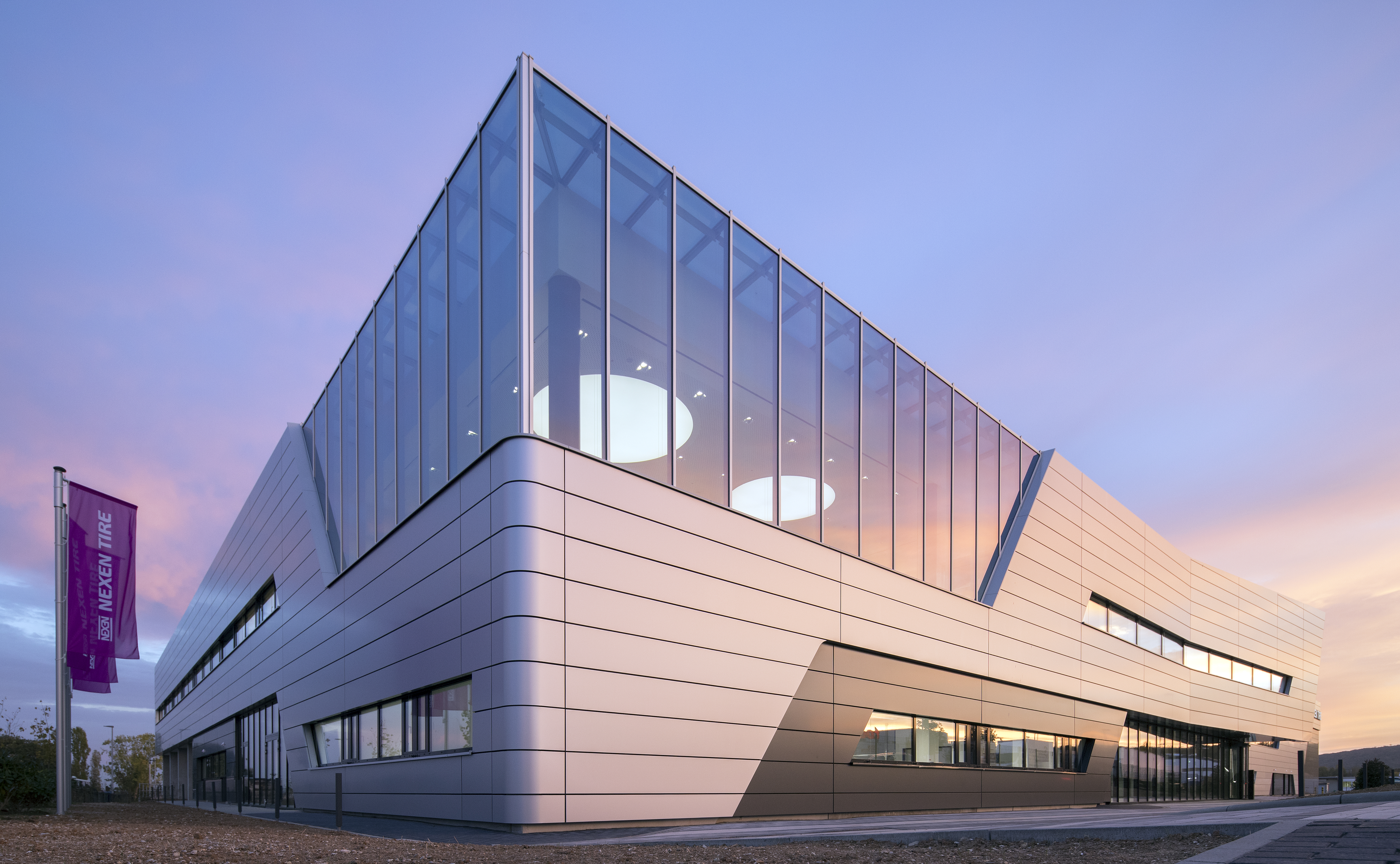
- Type: Public
- Traded as: KRX: 002350
- Founded: 1942; 84 years ago
- Headquarters: Yangsan, South Korea
- Key people: CEO John Bosco (Hyeon Suk) Kim
- Revenue: ▲US$ 1.960 billion (2023)
- Operating income: ▲US$ 108 million (2023)
- Net income: ▲US$ 74 million (2023)
- Total assets: ▲US$ 3.071 billion (2023)
- Number of employees: 3,998 (2014) non-consolidated in Korea
- Website: nexentire.com

Nexen Tire Corporation (Korean: 넥센타이어) is a tire manufacturer headquartered in Yangsan, South Gyeongsang Province and Seoul in South Korea. It was established in 1942 under the name Heung-A Tire Company. Nexen is a well-regarded tyre manufacturer known for its innovative and high-performance products. The company offers a diverse range of tyres for passenger cars, trucks, and SUVs, emphasizing safety, comfort, and efficiency.

In 1985, Nexen dedicated a facility in Yangsan, Korea, to the production of radial tires.

The company changed their name in 2000 from Woosung Tire to Nexen Tire Corporation. That same year also saw Nexen Tire listed on the KOSPI 200 Index future market.

In 2005, Nexen Tire was awarded a patent for the technology to manufacture rubber/stratified silicate nano-composite tires. By 2006, they had completed development on the new UHP and Winter LTR/SUV pattern. To accommodate increased demand, the company opened a manufacturing plant in Qingdao, China in 2007. Nexen's domestic market share increased from 8% to 20%, with annual sales exceeding $600 million. The company employs over 2,000 and currently exports to 120 countries. Its major Korean competitors are Hankook and Kumho.

The company's name, a portmanteau of next and century is reflected in its marketing tagline, "Next Century Tire."

== Manufacturing ==
Nexen Tire operates four tyre factories: two in South Korea, at Yangsan and Changnyeong, one in Qingdao, China, and one near Žatec in the Czech Republic.

The company's European factory opened in 2019 in Bitozeves. The site also includes a research and development facility. The factory was expanded in 2024, followed by an expansion of its automated warehouse in 2026.

== Sponsorship ==
Nexen has been a sponsor of Manchester City F.C. since 2015. Nexen became Manchester City's first sleeve sponsor in 2017. The sleeve sponsorship was extended to the men's training kit, Manchester City W.F.C.'s kit for all domestic competition and Manchester City Esports kit in 2020.Nexen has been sponsoring the Italian Serie A club Juventus since 2023 and has struck a collaboration arrangement with FC Bayern Munich, the famed German Bundesliga club, to begin in 2024.

Fredric Aasbø was a Nexen-sponsored competitor in Formula D, finishing runner-up in 2016, 2017, 2018 and 2019. Other notable Nexen drifters include Ken Gushi (2016-2017, 2021-2023), Tanner Foust (2016), Chris Forsberg (2018-2020), Trenton Beechum (2017–present), and Ryan Tuerck (2018).

== See also ==
- Economy of South Korea
- Korea New Network - Nexen Tire is the biggest shareholder of this channel.
- Nexen Heroes - Nexen Tire, the biggest sponsor, has naming rights of the first string of the Heroes Baseball Club.
