= 2014 Formula D season =

2014 Formula D

Seasons
- ← 2013 2015 →

The 2014 Formula D season, officially titled the Formula Drift Pro Championship, was the eleventh season of the Formula D series. The season began on April 4 at Grand Prix of Long Beach and ended on October 11 at Irwindale Speedway.

2009 champion Chris Forsberg was able to clinch his second Formula D title, finishing 11.5 points clear of his nearest rival, Fredric Aasbø. Forsberg, the event winner at Long Beach, went into the final round with a 26-point advantage but Aasbø – a winner at Wall Township Speedway and Texas Motor Speedway – closed slightly in the standings. Third place in the championship was another two-time event winner, Vaughn Gittin, who was the winner at Road Atlanta and Homestead-Miami Speedway. Other victories were taken by Darren McNamara at Evergreen Speedway while Daigo Saito was victorious at Irwindale Speedway. Scion were the winners of the Manufacturers' Cup, finishing 122 points clear of Nissan, while in the Tire Cup, Hankook finished clear of Nitto by a tally of 283.5 points.

== Schedule ==
Rnd	Title	Venue	Location	Date	Winner	Car
1	Streets of Long Beach	(California) Streets of Long Beach	Long Beach, CA	April 4 – 5	(United States) Chris Forsberg	Nissan 370Z
2	Road to the Championship	(Georgia (U.S. state)) Road Atlanta	Braselton, GA	May 9 – 10	(United States) Vaughn Gittin Jr.	Ford Mustang
3	Miami Heat	(Florida) Homestead-Miami Speedway	Homestead, FL	May 30 – 31	(United States) Vaughn Gittin Jr.	Ford Mustang
4	The Gauntlet	(New Jersey) Wall Township Speedway	Wall Township, NJ	June 20 – 21	(Norway) Fredric Aasbø	Scion tC
5	Throwdown	(Washington (state)) Evergreen Speedway	Monroe, WA	July 18 – 19	(Republic of Ireland) Darren McNamara	Nissan S14
6	Showdown	Texas Motor Speedway	Fort Worth, TX	September 12 – 13	(Norway) Fredric Aasbø	Scion tC
7	Title Fight	(California) Irwindale Speedway	Irwindale, CA	October 10 – 11	(Japan) Daigo Saito	Lexus SC430

=== Calendar changes ===
- Starting in 2014, the third round event was moved from Palm Beach International Raceway to Homestead-Miami Speedway. A round of Formula D had been held at the Palm Beach International Raceway since the 2011 season.

== Results and standings ==
=== Championship standings ===
Event winners in bold.

Pos	Driver	LBH	ATL	HMS	WTS	EVS	TEX	IRW	Points
1	(United States) Chris Forsberg	**104.50**	68.50	90.00	90.00	68.50	71.50	68.50	561.50
2	(Norway) Fredric Aasbø	52.50	84.50	52.50	**104.50**	68.50	**104.50**	83.00	550.00
3	(United States) Vaughn Gittin Jr.	39.50	**106.00**	**107.50**	35.00	20.50	51.00	33.50	393.00
4	(Lithuania) Aurimas Bakchis	51.00	51.00	19.00	68.50	54.00	84.50	36.50	364.50
5	(United States) Forrest Wang	51.00	42.00	36.50	35.00	19.00	74.00	74.00	331.50
6	(Norway) Kenneth Moen	84.50	51.00	70.00	36.50	33.50	17.50	17.50	310.50
7	(Republic of Ireland) Darren McNamara	51.00	33.50	17.50	51.00	**110.00**	17.50	17.50	298.00
8	(Republic of Ireland) Dean Kearney	17.50	33.50	33.50	49.50	81.50	36.50	35.00	287.00
9	(United States) Justin Pawlak	68.50	35.00	36.50	33.50	52.50	33.50	17.50	277.00
10	(United States) Conrad Grunewald	35.00	35.00	20.50	51.00	35.00	35.00	51.00	262.50
11	(Japan) Robbie Nishida	17.50	65.50	49.50	19.00	39.50	17.50	52.50	261.00
12	(United States) Ryan Tuerck	35.00	20.50	35.00	35.00	36.50	51.00	22.00	235.00
13	(Japan) Ken Gushi	17.50	52.50	19.00	17.50	49.50	36.50	35.00	227.50
14	(Japan) Daigo Saito	17.50	51.00	0.00	17.50	0.00	36.50	**101.50**	224.00
15	(United States) Matt Field	0.00	17.50	67.00	35.00	33.50	17.50	51.00	221.50
16	(United States) Michael Essa	74.00	17.50	17.50	19.00	33.50	19.00	35.00	218.50
17	(United States) Tyler McQuarrie	38.00	23.50	52.50	20.50	19.00	35.00	20.50	209.00
18	(Japan) Daijiro Yoshihara	17.50	17.50	0.00	52.50	35.00	19.00	55.50	197.00
19	(United States) Patrick Goodin	35.00	17.50	17.50	17.50	19.00	51.00	19.00	176.50
19	(United States) Kyle Mohan	35.00	19.00	17.50	19.00	33.50	17.50	35.00	176.50
21	(United States) Chelsea DeNofa	20.50	36.50	35.00	23.50	19.00	38.00	0.00	172.50
22	(Hong Kong) Charles Ng	0.00	33.50	19.00	65.50	19.00	17.50	0.00	154.50
23	(Dominican Republic) Jhonnattan Castro	17.50	19.00	35.00	17.50	19.00	35.00	0.00	143.00
24	(South Korea) Geoff Stoneback	17.50	17.50	49.50	0.00	17.50	17.50	17.50	137.00
25	(South Korea) Joon Woo-Maeng	0.00	0.00	0.00	17.50	49.50	49.50	17.50	134.00
26	(Canada) Marc Landreville	17.50	17.50	0.00	33.50	0.00	17.50	17.50	103.50
27	(Canada) Mats Baribeau	33.50	0.00	17.50	17.50	0.00	0.00	33.50	102.00
28	(United States) Ryan Kado	X	17.50	0.00	17.50	17.50	17.50	17.50	87.50
29	(Canada) Dave Briggs	17.50	0.00	33.50	17.50	0.00	0.00	17.50	86.00
29	(United States) Patrick Mordaunt	19.00	33.50	0.00	33.50	0.00	0.00	0.00	86.00
31	(United States) Alec Hohnadell	17.50	17.50	19.00	0.00	0.00	0.00	17.50	71.50
32	(United States) Tony Angelo	17.50	0.00	17.50	17.50	17.50	0.00	X	70.00
32	(United States) Matt Coffman	0.00	0.00	17.50	0.00	17.50	17.50	17.50	35.00
32	(United States) Jeff Jones	17.50	17.50	17.50	0.00	0.00	0.00	17.50	70.00
35	(Japan) Taka Aono	0.00	0.00	0.00	0.00	17.50	17.50	33.50	68.50
35	(Greece) Dennis Mertzanis	33.50	0.00	17.50	17.50	0.00	0.00	0.00	68.50
35	(Sweden) Carl Rydquist	17.50	0.00	33.50	0.00	17.50	0.00	0.00	68.50
38	(United States) Dan Savage	X	17.50	17.50	0.00	0.00	0.00	20.50	55.50
39	(United States) Karl Osaki	0.00	0.00	0.00	17.50	17.50	17.50	0.00	52.50
40	(United States) Danny George	0.00	17.50	17.50	0.00	0.00	0.00	0.00	35.00
40	(United States) Nate Hamilton	0.00	0.00	0.00	0.00	17.50	0.00	17.50	35.00
42	(Japan) Kuniaki Takahashi	0.00	19.00	0.00	0.00	0.00	0.00	X	19.00
43	(United States) Will Parsons	0.00	0.00	0.00	0.00	0.00	17.50	0.00	17.50
43	(United States) Mike Pollard	X	X	X	X	17.50	0.00	0.00	17.50
43	(United States) Jeremy Richter	17.50	X	X	X	X	X	X	17.50
43	(Finland) Juha Rintanen	X	X	X	0.00	0.00	17.50	0.00	17.50
Pos	Driver	LBH	ATL	HMS	WTS	EVS	TEX	IRW	Points

=== Manufacturer Cup ===
Pos	Manufacturer	Points
1	(Japan) Scion	843.00
2	(Japan) Nissan	721.00
3	(United States) Ford	670.00
4	(Japan) Lexus	485.00
5	(United States) Chevrolet	471.50
6	(Germany) BMW	391.00
7	(United States) Dodge	287.00
8	(Japan) Mazda	176.50
9	(Japan) Toyota	170.50
10	(South Korea) Hyundai	19.00
11	(Japan) Honda	0.00
11	(Japan) Infiniti	0.00
11	(Japan) Subaru	0.00

=== Tire Cup ===
Pos	Brand	Points
1	(South Korea) Hankook	1119.50
2	(Japan) Nitto	836.00
3	(Indonesia) Achilles	801.00
4	(Japan) Falken	681.50
5	(Chinese Taipei) Maxxis	386.50
6	(Japan) Yokohama	307.50
7	(Singapore) GT Radial	176.50
8	(Chinese Taipei) Kenda	172.00
