= 2008 Formula D season =

2008 Formula D

Seasons
- ← 2007 2009 →

The 2008 Formula D season (officially titled Castrol Syntec Power Cup) was the fifth season for the Formula D series. The series began April 12, 2008 and concluded on October 11. The highest scoring drivers of the series were invited to a non-point scoring All-Star event to compete with other drivers from other series all over the world on November 16, 2008.

== Schedule ==
| Round | Title | Circuit | Location | Date | Winner | Car | Results |
|---|---|---|---|---|---|---|---|
| 1 | Streets of Long Beach | (California) Streets of Long Beach | Long Beach, California | April 12 | (United States) Chris Forsberg | (Japan) Nissan 350Z-VK56DE V8 | Results |
| 2 | Feel the Heat | (Georgia (U.S. state)) Road Atlanta | Braselton, Georgia | May 10 | (New Zealand) Rhys Millen | (United States) Pontiac Solstice | Results |
| 3 | The Gauntlet | (New Jersey) Englishtown Raceway Park | Englishtown, New Jersey | June 14 | (United States) Tanner Foust | (Japan) Nissan 350Z | Results |
| 4 | High Stakes | Las Vegas Motor Speedway | Las Vegas, Nevada | July 12 | (Japan) Toshiki Yoshioka | (Japan) Toyota AE86 Sprinter Trueno | Results |
| 5 | Breaking Point | (Washington (state)) Evergreen Speedway | Monroe, Washington | August 9 | (New Zealand) Rhys Millen | (United States) Pontiac Solstice | Results |
| 6 | Locked and Loaded | (California) Infineon Raceway | Sonoma, California | September 13 | (United States) Tanner Foust | (Japan) Nissan 350Z | Results |
| 7 | Final Fight | (California) Toyota Speedway | Irwindale, California | October 11 | (United States) Vaughn Gittin, Jr. | (United States) Ford Mustang | Results |
| nc | Red Bull Drifting World Championship | (California) Purpose-built | Port of Long Beach, California | November 16 | (New Zealand) Rhys Millen | (United States) Pontiac Solstice | Results |

== Championship standings ==
Event winners in bold.

| Pos | Driver | LBH | ATL | ENG | LVS | EVS | SON | IRW | Points |
|---|---|---|---|---|---|---|---|---|---|
| 1 | (United States) Tanner Foust | 83 | 69 | **107** | 62 | 76 | **107** | 95 | 599 |
| 2 | (Sweden) Samuel Hübinette | 96 | 66 | 66 | 85 | 96 | 69 | 66 | 544 |
| 3 | (New Zealand) Rhys Millen | | **103** | 84 | 67 | **101** | 93 | 62 | 510 |
| 4 | (Japan) Daijiro Yoshihara | 65 | 75 | 77 | 91 | 58 | 57 | 58 | 481 |
| 5 | (United States) Chris Forsberg | **106** | 56 | 64 | 56 | 56 | 65 | 56 | 459 |
| 6 | (United States) Ryan Tuerck | 63 | 80 | 56 | 55 | 63 | 72 | 64 | 453 |
| 7 | (Japan) Michihiro Takatori | 54 | 88 | 54 | 69 | 61 | 55 | 71 | 452 |
| 8 | (United States) Vaughn Gittin, Jr. | 58 | 68 | 56 | 0.25 | 0.25 | 71 | **103** | 356.5 |
| 9 | (United States) Conrad Grunewald | 55 | 55 | 63 | 0.25 | 56 | 65 | 55 | 349.25 |
| 10 | (United States) Robbie Nishida | 0.25 | 55 | 0 | 62 | 83 | 55 | 63 | 318.25 |
| 11 | (Japan) Ryuji Miki | 55 | 0.25 | 64 | 0.25 | 64 | 55 | 62 | 300.5 |
| 12 | (Republic of Ireland) Darren McNamara | 61 | 56 | 55 | | 65 | 0 | 0.25 | 237.25 |
| 13 | (France) Stephan Verdier | 0.25 | 58 | 55 | 56 | 0.25 | 55 | 0.25 | 224.75 |
| 14 | (Japan) Ken Gushi | 56 | 0.25 | 0.25 | 55 | 55 | 56 | 0.25 | 222.75 |
| 15 | (United States) Bill Sherman | 0.25 | 63 | 0 | | | 84 | 56 | 203.25 |
| 16 | (United States) Justin Pawlak | 57 | 0.25 | 0.25 | 0.25 | 55 | 0.25 | 84 | 197 |
| 17 | (United States) Kyle Mohan | 70 | 0.25 | 0 | 0.25 | 55 | 56 | 0.25 | 181.75 |
| 18 | (Japan) Kenji Yamanaka | 55 | 55 | 0 | 0.25 | 0.25 | 56 | 0.25 | 166.75 |
| 19 | (Japan) Kazu Hayashida | 63 | | | 0 | 60 | 0 | 0.25 | 123.25 |
| 20 | (Japan) Manabu Orido | | | | 64 | | | 58 | 122 |
| 21 | (United States) Mitsuru Haruguchi | 64 | | | 0 | | 0.25 | 55 | 119.25 |
| 22 | (United States) Tony Angelo | 0.25 | 0.25 | 56 | 0.25 | 56 | 0.25 | 0.25 | 113.25 |
| 23 | (Japan) Toshiki Yoshioka | 0.25 | | | **104** | | 0.25 | 0.25 | 104.75 |
| 24 | (United States) Tyler McQuarrie | 0.25 | 0.25 | 92 | 0.25 | 0 | 0 | 0.25 | 93 |
| 25 | (Ghana) Tony Brakohiapa | 0 | 0.25 | 0 | 63 | 0.25 | 0.25 | 0.25 | 64 |
| 26 | (United States) John Russakoff | | | | 58 | | | 0.25 | 58.25 |
| 27 | (Japan) Hiro Sumida | 0 | 57 | 0.25 | 0.25 | 0 | 0.25 | | 57.75 |
| 28 | (Japan) Yasu Kondo | 0.25 | | | 56 | 0 | 0.25 | 0.25 | 56.75 |
| 29 | (Japan) Taka Aono | 0.25 | 0.25 | 0.25 | 0.25 | 0.25 | 0.25 | 55 | 56.5 |
| 30 | (United States) Patrick Mordaunt | 0.25 | 55 | 0.25 | 0 | 0.25 | 0.25 | 0.25 | 56.25 |
| 31= | (United States) (Japan) Ross Petty | 0.25 | 0.25 | 55 | 0 | 0.25 | 0.25 | | 56 |
| 31= | (United States) Calvin Wan | 0.25 | 0.25 | 0.25 | 55 | 0.25 | 0 | | 56 |
| 33 | (United States) Blake Fuller | 0 | 0.25 | 55 | 0 | 0.25 | 0.25 | | 55.75 |
| 34 | (United States) Henry Schelley | 0.25 | 0.25 | 0.25 | 0.25 | 0.25 | 0 | | 1.25 |
| 35= | (South Korea) Joon Maeng | 0.25 | 0 | 0.25 | 0.25 | 0.25 | 0 | | 1 |
| 35= | (United States) Stephan Papadakis | 0.25 | 0.25 | 0.25 | 0 | 0 | 0.25 | | 1 |
| 35= | (Japan) Seigo Yamamoto | 0.25 | 0.25 | 0 | 0 | 0.25 | 0 | 0.25 | 1 |
| 38= | (United States) Chris Kregorian | 0.25 | 0.25 | 0 | 0 | 0.25 | | | 0.75 |
| 38= | (United States) Quoc Ly | 0 | | | 0.25 | | 0.25 | 0.25 | 0.75 |
| 38= | (United States) Brian Peter | 0 | 0.25 | 0.25 | 0 | 0.25 | 0 | | 0.75 |
| 41= | (United States) Gary Lang | 0 | 0 | 0.25 | 0 | 0 | 0 | 0.25 | 0.5 |
| 41= | (United States) Tommy Suell | 0 | | | 0.25 | 0.25 | | | 0.5 |
| 41= | (New Zealand) Jairus Wharerau | 0 | | | 0.25 | | 0.25 | | 0.5 |
| 44= | (United States) James Bondurant | 0 | 0.25 | 0 | 0 | | | | 0.25 |
| 44= | (United States) Alex Pfeiffer | | | | 0 | | | 0.25 | 0.25 |
| 44= | (United States) Doug Van Den Brink | 0 | | | 0.25 | | | | 0.25 |
| 44= | (United States) Dan Willie | | 0 | 0.25 | | | 0 | | 0.25 |

Driver did not compete in event.

== Honors ==
- Rookie of the Year

Michihiro Takatori

- Most improved driver

Stephan Verdier

- Driver of the Year

Ryan Tuerck

- Hardest Charging Driver

Robbie Nishida

- Spirit of Drifting

Patrick Mordaunt

- Superstar of the Year

Tanner Foust

- Best Style

Daijiro Yoshihara
