= 2009 Formula D season =

2009 Formula D

Seasons
- ← 2008 2010 →

The 2009 Formula D season (officially titled Formula Drift Professional Championship) was the sixth season for the Formula D series. The series began April 11 and concluded on October 11. Chris Forsberg took his first series title in a Nissan 350Z; the third season in succession in which a Nissan car had won the championship.

== Schedule ==
| Round | Title | Circuit | Location | Date | Winner | Car | Results |
|---|---|---|---|---|---|---|---|
| 1 | Streets of Long Beach | (California) Streets of Long Beach | Long Beach, California | April 11 | (United States) Ryan Tuerck | (United States) Pontiac Solstice | Results |
| 2 | Proving Ground | (Georgia (U.S. state)) Road Atlanta | Braselton, Georgia | May 9 | (United States) Chris Forsberg | (Japan) Nissan 350Z | Results |
| 3 | The Gauntlet | (New Jersey) Wall Township Speedway | Wall Township, New Jersey | June 6 | (Republic of Ireland) Darren McNamara | (United States) Saturn Sky | Results |
| 4 | All In | (Nevada) Las Vegas Motor Speedway | Las Vegas, Nevada | July 11 | (United States) Tanner Foust | (Japan) Scion tC | Results |
| 5 | Breaking Point | (Washington (state)) Evergreen Speedway | Monroe, Washington | August 8 | (United States) Chris Forsberg | (Japan) Nissan 350Z | Results |
| 6 | Locked and Loaded | (California) Infineon Raceway | Sonoma, California | August 22 (Note: The Sonoma round was originally scheduled for September 12 but the event was brought forward to August 22, sharing the billing with the IndyCar Grand Prix of Sonoma.) | (France) Stephan Verdier | (Japan) Subaru Impreza WRX STI | Results |
| 7 | Judgement Day | (California) Toyota Speedway | Irwindale, California | October 17 (Note: The Irwindale round was originally scheduled for October 11.) | (United States) Ryan Tuerck | (United States) Pontiac Solstice | Results |

== Championship standings ==
Event winners in bold.

| Pos | Driver | LBH | ATL | WTS | LVS | EVS | SON | IRW | Points |
|---|---|---|---|---|---|---|---|---|---|
| 1 | (United States) Chris Forsberg | 62 | **102** | 63 | 80 | **103** | 60 | 57 | 527 |
| 2 | (United States) Ryan Tuerck | **102** | 80 | 50 | 62 | 69 | 51 | **107** | 521 |
| 3 | (United States) Tyler McQuarrie | 48.5 | 62 | 85 | 69.5 | 82 | 49 | 89 | 485 |
| 4 | (Sweden) Samuel Hübinette | 90 | 58 | 65 | 58 | 67 | 61.25 | 63 | 462.25 |
| 5 | (United States) Vaughn Gittin, Jr. | 62 | 57 | 92 | 54.5 | 71 | 65 | 50 | 451.5 |
| 6 | (United States) Tanner Foust | 84 | 62 | 0 | **100.5** | 54 | 69 | 78 | 447.5 |
| 7 | (Republic of Ireland) Darren McNamara | 61 | 94 | **105** | 0 | 56 | 54.5 | 56 | 426.5 |
| 8 | (United States) Robbie Nishida | 72 | 63 | 62 | 62 | 55 | 48.25 | 63 | 425.25 |
| 9 | (United States) Justin Pawlak | 58 | 63 | 57 | 67 | 53 | 56 | 62 | 416 |
| 10 | (Japan) Ken Gushi | 0 | 61.5 | 77 | 49 | 55 | 91 | 55 | 388.5 |
| 11 | (Japan) Daijiro Yoshihara | 50 | 55 | 51 | 52 | 52 | 56 | 65 | 381 |
| 12 | (Ghana) Tony Brakohiapa | 62 | 54.25 | 54.5 | 48.25 | 63 | 49 | 48.25 | 379.25 |
| 13 | (United States) (Japan) Ross Petty | 48.5 | 55 | 55 | 54.25 | 68 | 48.25 | 48.25 | 377.25 |
| 14 | (Japan) Taka Aono | 65 | 48.25 | 61.25 | 48.5 | 50 | 48.25 | 48.5 | 369.75 |
| 15 | (France) Stephan Verdier | 62 | 51 | 50 | 51 | 49 | **101** | 0 | 364 |
| 16 | (Japan) Ryuji Miki | 0 | 59 | 55 | 88.5 | 54.25 | 85 | 0 | 341.75 |
| 17 | (South Korea) Joon Maeng | 48.5 | 70 | 54.5 | 54.25 | 48.5 | 0 | 57 | 332.75 |
| 18 | (Republic of Ireland) Eric O'Sullivan | 48.25 | 0 | 48.5 | 49 | 89 | 48.5 | 49 | 332.25 |
| 19 | (New Zealand) Rhys Millen | 48.5 | 58 | 60 | 0 | 48.5 | 66 | 48.5 | 329.5 |
| 20 | (United States) Patrick Mordaunt | 48.25 | 61.25 | 56 | 54.5 | 48.25 | 49 | 0 | 317.25 |
| 21 | (United States) Kyle Mohan | 48.5 | 0 | 48.5 | 50 | 48.5 | 54.5 | 66 | 316 |
| 22 | (Japan) Kenji Yamanaka | 0 | 48.5 | 55 | 49 | 48.5 | 54.5 | 48.5 | 304 |
| 23 | (United States) Calvin Wan | 48.5 | 48.25 | 48.25 | 0 | 48.25 | 48.25 | 48.25 | 289.75 |
| 24 | (United States) Michael Essa | 0 | 48.5 | | 63 | 48.5 | 48.5 | 55 | 263.5 |
| 25 | (Japan) Yasu Kondo | 54.25 | | | 48.5 | 54.5 | 54.5 | 48.25 | 260 |
| 26 | (Japan) Michihiro Takatori | 48.25 | 49 | 48.5 | 54.25 | 54.5 | 0 | 0 | 254.5 |
| 27 | (United States) Tommy Suell | 0 | 48.25 | 48.25 | 50 | 48.25 | 0 | 58 | 252.75 |
| 28 | (Japan) Katsuhiro Ueo | 55 | | | 61 | | 69 | 48.5 | 233.5 |
| 29 | (United States) Matt Powers | 48.25 | | | 48.25 | | 50 | 69.5 | 216 |
| 30 | (Japan) Kazu Hayashida | 53 | | | 61.25 | | 48.5 | 48.5 | 211.25 |
| 31 | (United States) Alex Pfeiffer | | | | 48.25 | 48.5 | 58 | 54.5 | 209.25 |
| 32 | (United States) Jeff Jones | 54.5 | 48.25 | 48.25 | 0 | 0 | 48.25 | 0 | 199.25 |
| 33 | (United States) Matt Waldin | 48.25 | 48.5 | 48.5 | | | | 48.25 | 193.5 |
| 34 | (Mexico) Casper Canul | 48.25 | 48.25 | 48.5 | 48.25 | | | | 193.25 |
| 35 | (Sweden) Carl Rydquist | 48.25 | 48.25 | | 51 | | | | 147.5 |
| 36 | (United States) Doug Van Den Brink | 0 | 48.5 | 48.5 | | | | 48.25 | 145.25 |
| 37 | (United States) Ron Ewerth | 0 | 0 | 48.25 | 0 | 48.25 | 48.25 | 0 | 144.75 |
| 38 | (United States) Jodin LeJeune | 0 | 0 | 0 | 0 | 54.25 | 0 | 48.25 | 102.5 |
| 39 | (United States) Bill Sherman | | | | 48.5 | | 50 | | 98.5 |
| 40 | (United States) Chris Kregorian | 0 | 48.5 | 48.25 | 0 | | | | 96.75 |
| 41= | (United States) Cody Parkhouse | 0 | | | | | 48.25 | 48.25 | 96.5 |
| 41= | (United States) John Wagner | | 48.25 | 48.25 | | | | | 96.5 |
| 43 | (United States) Conrad Grunewald | 57 | | | | | | | 57 |
| 44 | (United States) Quoc Ly | 56 | | | | | | | 56 |
| 45 | (United States) Mitsuru Haruguchi | | | | 53 | | | | 53 |
| 46 | (United States) John Russakoff | 48.5 | | | | | | | 48.5 |
| 47 | (United States) Gary Lang | | 0 | 48.25 | | | | | 48.25 |

Driver did not compete in event.

== Honors ==
- Rookie of the Year

Eric O’Sullivan

- Most improved driver

Stephan Verdier

- Driver of the Year

Chris Forsberg

- Hardest Charging Driver

- Spirit of Drifting

Taka Aono

- Superstar of the Year

- Best Style

Ross Petty
