= 2026 Formula Drift season =

Motorsport season

The 2026 Formula Drift season (officially titled and stylized as the Formula DRIFT PRO Championship) was the twenty-third season of the Formula D series. The season began on April 10 at Long Beach and concluded on October 24 at Long Beach.

This was the first year to feature three new tracks added to the schedule, whereas former years have seen largely the same schedule. The new schedule featured Stafford Motor Speedway, Indianapolis Raceway Park, and The Bullring at Las Vegas Motor Speedway, replacing Englishtown Raceway Park, World Wide Technology Raceway, and Utah Motorsports Campus, respectively.

== Schedule ==
Round	Title	Circuit	Location	Date	Winner	Car
1	Streets of Long Beach	(California) Long Beach Street Circuit	Long Beach, California	April 10	(Republic of Ireland) Conor Shanahan	Toyota GT86
2	Road to the Championship	(Georgia (U.S. state)) Road Atlanta	Braselton, Georgia	May 7	(United States) Vaughn Gittin Jr.	Ford Mustang RTR Spec 5-FD
3	Scorched	(Florida) Orlando Speed World	Orlando, Florida	May 29	(Lithuania) Aurimas Bakchis	Subaru BRZ
4	Battle at the Springs	(Connecticut) Stafford Motor Speedway	Stafford, Connecticut	June 18	(Republic of Ireland) James Deane	Ford Mustang RTR Spec 5-FD
5	Midwest Mayhem	(Indiana) Indianapolis Raceway Park	Indianapolis, Indiana	July 30	Cancelled	
6	Throwdown	(Washington (state)) Evergreen Speedway	Monroe, Washington	August 21	(Republic of Ireland) Conor Shanahan	Toyota GT86
7	High Stakes	(Nevada) The Bullring at Las Vegas Motor Speedway	Las Vegas, Nevada	September 24	(Republic of Ireland) Conor Shanahan	Toyota GT86
8	Long Beach Shoreline Showdown	(California) Long Beach Street Circuit	Long Beach, California	October 17	(Republic of Ireland) James Deane	Ford Mustang RTR Spec 5-FD

== Teams and drivers ==
Team	No.	Car	Tires	Driver	Round(s)
272 Motorsports	272	Nissan 350Z	Kumho	(United States) Cody Buchanan R	All
59 Racing	59	BMW 1 Series E82	Kumho	(Republic of Ireland) Jack Shanahan	All
Beechum Racing	999	BMW M3 E46	Kenda	(United States) Trenton Beechum	All
Drift Cave Motorsports	777	Corvette C6	GT Radial	(United States) Matt Field	All
Dylan Hughes Racing	129	BMW M3 E46	GT Radial	(United States) Dylan Hughes	All
Feal Suspension Race Team	723	Subaru BRZ	GT Radial	(Lithuania) Aurimas Bakchis	All
Forsberg Racing	64	Nissan Z	Kumho	(United States) Chris Forsberg	All
FS17 DRIFTING DEPARTMENT	117	BMW 1 Series E82	Kumho	(Italy) Federico Sceriffo	1–4, 8
Garagistic Racing	171	BMW M3 E36	Kumho	(United States) Rome Charpentier	All
Hateley Motorsports	98	BMW M3 E46	Kumho	(United States) Andy Hateley	All
Higa Motorsport	169	Toyota GR86	GT Radial	(Brazil) Diego Higa	1–3
Jeff Jones Racing	818	Nissan 370Z	Kumho	(United States) Jeff Jones	1–3, 5–8
Jerry Yang Racing	79	Toyota GT86	GT Radial	(Republic of Ireland) Conor Shanahan	All
Jerry Yang Racing	90	Toyota GT86	GT Radial	(Japan) Shinji Minowa	6–7
Jerry Yang Racing	168	Toyota GT86	GT Radial	(Japan) Hiroya Minowa	1
Jerry Yang Racing	530	Toyota GT86	Kenda	(Japan) Wataru Masuyama	All
Jhonnathan Castro Racing	17	Toyota GR86	Kenda	(Dominican Republic) Jhonnathan Castro	All
KGMS Gazoo Racing	21	Toyota GR86	Kenda	(Japan) Ken Gushi	All
LZMFG	5	BMW M3 E36	Tire Streets	(United States) Adam LZ	All
Nate Chen Racing	4	Toyota GT86	Kenda	(United States) Nate Chen R	All
OSULLY RACING	107	BMW M3 E46	GT Radial	(United States) Connor O'Sullivan	All
Papadakis Racing	151	Toyota GR Supra	Kenda	(Norway) Fredric Aasbø	All
Papadakis Racing	411	Toyota GR Corolla	Kenda	(United States) Ryan Tuerck	All
RAD Industries	34	Toyota Supra	GT Radial	(United States) Dan Burkett	All
Richards Racing	11	Toyota GT86	GT Radial	(United States) Cole Richards R	All
RTR Vehicles Drift Team	25	Ford Mustang RTR Spec 5-FD	Nitto	(United States) Vaughn Gittin Jr.	2, 8
RTR Vehicles Drift Team	130	Ford Mustang RTR Spec 5-FD	Nitto	(Republic of Ireland) James Deane	All
RTR Vehicles Drift Team	213	Ford Mustang RTR Spec 5-FD	Nitto	(United States) Ben Hobson	All
Ryan Litteral Racing	909	Nissan Silvia S15	Kumho	(United States) Ryan Litteral	All
Simen Olsen Drifting	707	Toyota GR Supra	Kenda	(Norway) Simen Olsen	1–4, 6–8
SORENSEN MOTORSPORTS	513	BMW M3	GT Radial	(United States) Branden Sorensen	All
Stuke Racing	527	Nissan Silvia S14.9	Kenda	(United States) Daniel Stuke	All
Team Hansen	119	Nissan 240SX S13	Kenda	(United States) Rudy Hansen	All
Team Infamous	27	Nissan Silvia S14.9	Kenda	(United States) Derek Madison	All
TLO Drift Team	233	Corvette C7	Kenda	(Canada) Tommy Lemaire	All

R Eligible for Rookie of the Year

== Championship standings ==
2026 saw the return of the classic qualifying format. Each driver therefore performs two solo runs which are judged on parameters such as line, angle and style, all defined within the sporting regulations, and awarded a numerical score up to 100. An AI drift judge system Wally was introduced in 2026 to help with judging the runs. The scores are ranked to determine the qualifying classification and set the brackets for the competition stage for the top 32 scoring drivers. The top three receive 4, 3 and 2 points, with every other driver who sets a score receiving 1 point.

During the competition stage, the drivers proceed through a series of competition heats, with each driver performing a lead run and a chase run. The format features progression through Top 32, Top 16, Top 8, Top 4 and the Final. The two drivers eliminated in Top 4 run an additional heat to determine the final podium position. For the remaining drivers, the final classification within each round is determined by the highest qualifying position.

=== Qualifying Stage ===
Position	1st	2nd	3rd	Others scoring
Points	4	3	2	1

=== Competition Stage ===
Battles won	5	4	3		2	1	0	
Position	1st	2nd	3rd	4th	5th–8th	9th–16th	17th–32nd	33rd–48th
Points	50	40	30	30	20	10	0	0

=== Pro Championship standings ===
Pos	Driver	LBH1	ATL	ORL	STA	IND (Note: Round 5 at Indianapolis was cancelled because of rain. Points were only awarded for qualifying with everyone receiving from 4 to 1 point, except for Jeff Jones who didn't qualify.)	EVS	LVS	LBH2	Pts
1	(Republic of Ireland) Conor Shanahan	1	8	25	3^{3}	C	1^{2}	1^{2}	9^{3}	224
2	(Republic of Ireland) James Deane	9^{1}	2^{2}	2	1	C	9^{1}	19	1^{2}	218
3	(Republic of Ireland) Jack Shanahan	3^{2}	10	6	2	C^{1}	5	3	2^{1}	206
4	(United States) Branden Sorensen	6	4^{3}	4	6^{2}	C	3^{3}	5^{1}	17	165
5	(United States) Matt Field	18	9	8	10	C^{2}	4	2	4	150
6	(Norway) Fredric Aasbø	2	18	3^{3}	9	C	2	18	5	149
7	(Lithuania) Aurimas Bakchis	5	3^{1}	1	8	C^{3}	17	17	19	132
8	(United States) Dylan Hughes	8	6	7	5^{1}	C	18	20	18	91
9	(United States) Ryan Tuerck	11	7	14	7	C	12	14	23	88
10	(United States) Chris Forsberg	10^{3}	5	5^{1}	17	C	27	6^{3}	DNP (Note: Forsberg suffered an engine failure during the practice session and therefore did not attempt to qualify.)	82
11	(United States) Cole Richards RY	4	11	9^{2}	DNQ	C	10	10	28	79
12	(United States) Adam LZ	17	17	10	18	C	6	11	3	78
13	(United States) Daniel Stuke	21	20	32	11	C	15	4	11	68
14	(United States) Ben Hobson	13	33	20	4	C	7	24	22	67
15	(United States) Vaughn Gittin Jr.		1						11	62
16	(United States) Dan Burkett	19	14	16	13	C	25	13	14	58
17	(United States) Trenton Beechum	23	16	11	DNQ	C	13	7	25	57
18	(Norway) Simen Olsen	14	13	24	15		21	22	7	57
19	(United States) Rudy Hansen	31	15	30	28	C	16	15	16	48
20	(United States) Cody Buchanan R	25	31	18	12	C	8	23	24	38
21	(United States) Ryan Litteral	16	27	27	25	C	22	28	8	38
22	(Canada) Tommy Lemaire	22	24	19	20	C	11	9	10	38
23	(Japan) Wataru Masuyama	29	12	15	22	C	24	21	12	38
24	(United States) Rome Charpentier	33	19	26	26	C	14	31	6	37
25	(Japan) Ken Gushi	26	28	12	21	C	23	12	20	28
26	(United States) Andy Hateley	28	32	31	16	C	28	16	31	28
27	(United States) Jeff Jones	15	30	17		C	19	30	13	26
28	(Brazil) Diego Higa	7	21	28						23
29	(Japan) Shinji Minowa						31	8		22
30	(Dominican Republic) Jhonnathan Castro	30	26	13	24	C	30	29	30	18
31	(United States) Derek Madison	32	29	29	14	C	26	26	29	18
32	(Japan) Hiroya Minowa	12								11
33	(United States) Connor O'Sullivan	24	23	22	19	C	20	25	26	8
34	(United States) Nate Chen R	20	25	23	23	C	29	27	21	8
35	(Italy) Federico Sceriffo	27	22	21	27				27	5

In-line notation
RY	Rookie of the Year
R	Rookie
^{Superscript Number}	Qualifying position
