= 2015 Formula D season =

2015 Formula D

Seasons
- ← 2014 2016 →

The 2015 Formula D season, officially titled the Formula Drift Pro Championship, was the twelfth season of the Formula D series. The season began on April 10 at Long Beach and ended on October 10 at Irwindale Speedway.

== Schedule & results ==
Round			Title	Venue	Location	Date	Winner	Car
Pro	Pro 2	World	Title	Venue	Location	Date	Winner	Car
1		1	Streets of Long Beach	(California) Streets of Long Beach	Long Beach, CA	April 10 – 11	(Norway) Fredric Aasbø	Scion tC
2		2	Road to the Championship	(Georgia (U.S. state)) Road Atlanta	Braselton, GA	May 8 – 9	(Lithuania) Aurimas Bakchis	Nissan 240SX
	1			(Florida) Orlando Speed World	Orlando, FL	June 4 – 5	(Peru) Alex Heilbrunn	BMW 3 Series
3		3	Uncharted Territory	(Florida) Orlando Speed World	Orlando, FL	June 5 – 6	(United States) Ryan Tuerck	Scion FR-S
4		4	The Gauntlet	(New Jersey) Wall Township Speedway	Wall Township, NJ	June 26 – 27	(Norway) Fredric Aasbø	Scion tC
		5		(Shizuoka Prefecture) Fuji Speedway	Oyama, Shizuoka, Japan	July 11 – 12	(Japan) Masato Kawabata	Nissan GT-R
	2			(Washington (state)) Evergreen Speedway	Monroe, WA	July 23 – 24	(United States) James Evans	Nissan 370Z
5		6	Throwdown	(Washington (state)) Evergreen Speedway	Monroe, WA	July 24 – 25	(Norway) Fredric Aasbø	Scion tC
	3			Texas Motor Speedway	Fort Worth, TX	August 20 – 21	(Peru) Alex Heilbrunn	BMW 3 Series
6		7	Showdown	Texas Motor Speedway	Fort Worth, TX	August 21 – 22	(Japan) Masashi Yokoi	Nissan S15
		8		(Quebec) Autodrome Saint-Eustache	St.Eustache, QC, Canada	September 6 – 7	(Norway) Fredric Aasbø	Scion tC
	4			(California) Irwindale Speedway	Irwindale, CA	October 8 – 9	(Finland) Juha Rintanen	Nissan S14
7		9	Title Fight	(California) Irwindale Speedway	Irwindale, CA	October 9 – 10	(Norway) Fredric Aasbø	Scion tC

=== Calendar changes & notes ===
- Prior to the season, Formula D announced a new multi-year television deal with CBS Sports Network.
- The third round has moved from Homestead-Miami Speedway to Orlando Speed World. This is the first time Formula D has held an event in Orlando.
- Prior to the season, Formula D announced the start of a new international series called the Formula D World Championship starting in 2015. The new series is eligible to drivers that compete in all 7 Pro Championship rounds and 3 international rounds. The three international rounds will be held at the Fuji Speedway in Japan, Autodrome Saint-Eustache in Canada, and a to-be-determined site in China.
- In September 2015, Formula D announced the cancellation of the final World Championship round in China. Irwindale will be the final round the series.

== Results and standings ==
=== Pro Championship standings ===
Event winners in bold.

Pos	Driver	LBH	ATL	ORL	WTS	EVS	TEX	IRW	Points
1	(Norway) Fredric Aasbø	**105.00**	38.00	19.00	**106.00**	**105.00**	55.00	**104.00**	532.00
2	(Japan) Ken Gushi	18.00	84.00	71.00	55.00	36.00	84.00	85.00	433.00
3	(United States) Chris Forsberg	38.00	68.00	83.00	36.00	36.00	70.00	51.00	382.00
4	(United States) Ryan Tuerck	68.00	35.00	**105.00**	67.00	22.00	35.00	35.00	367.00
5	(Lithuania) Aurimas Bakchis	83.00	**104.00**	36.00	51.00	19.00	19.00	51.00	363.00
6	(Japan) Masashi Yokoi	18.00	35.00	50.00	66.00	18.00	**104.00**	35.00	326.00
7	(United States) Justin Pawlak	36.00	39.00	20.00	37.00	67.00	21.00	68.00	288.00
8	(United States) Forrest Wang	23.00	67.00	18.00	51.00	20.00	35.00	71.00	285.00
9	(United States) Matt Field	68.00	18.00	70.00	35.00	51.00	1.00	38.00	282.00
10	(United States) Alec Hohnadell	20.00	35.00	50.00	18.00	11.00	51.00	18.00	276.00
11	(Norway) Kenneth Moen	18.00	51.00	35.00	36.00	39.00	52.00	18.00	249.00
12	(Japan) Daigo Saito	18.00	18.00	18.00	34.00	50.00	68.00	34.00	240.00
13	(United States) Vaughn Gittin Jr.	52.00	36.00	51.00	19.00	50.00	19.00	0.00	227.00
14	(Republic of Ireland) Dean Kearney	18.00	18.00	34.00	82.00	18.00	32.00	18.00	222.00
15	(United States) Tyler McQuarrie	51.00	19.00	36.00	18.00	50.00	19.00	19.00	212.00
16	(United States) Chelsea DeNofa	34.00	18.00	18.00	52.00	35.00	18.00	36.00	211.00
17	(United States) Patrick Goodin	19.0	50.00	1.00	36.00	67.00	18.00	19.00	210.00
18	(United States) Patrick Mordaunt	50.00	18.00	52.00	35.00	19.00	1.00	34.00	209.00
19	(New Zealand) Mike Whiddett	X	36.00	35.00	0.00	34.00	35.00	52.00	192.00
20	(Hong Kong) Charles Ng	34.00	51.00	1.00	1.00	19.00	34.00	52.00	190.00
21	(South Korea) Geoff Stoneback	35.00	50.00	18.00	18.00	34.00	1.00	18.00	174.00
22	(Japan) Daijiro Yoshihara	35.00	0.00	20.00	18.00	18.00	51.00	19.00	161.00
23	(Dominican Republic) Jhonnattan Castro	1.00	18.00	34.00	35.00	18.00	34.00	18.00	158.00
24	(United States) Conrad Grunewald	18.00	37.00	18.00	18.00	18.00	18.00	18.00	145.00
25	(United States) Dan Savage	35.00	18.00	18.00	19.00	18.00	18.00	18.00	144.00
26	(Japan) Robbie Nishida	51.00	1.00	35.00	20.00	0.00	18.00	18.00	143.00
27	(United States) Michael Essa	1.00	18.00	18.00	18.00	35.00	18.00	34.00	142.00
28	(Latvia) Kristaps Blušs	18.00	1.00	18.00	18.00	20.00	34.00	18.00	127.00
29	(United States) Kyle Mohan	18.00	18.00	18.00	18.00	18.00	18.00	18.00	126.00
29	(United States) Matt Coffman	34.00	18.00	18.00	1.00	34.00	20.00	1.00	126.00
31	(United States) Jeff Jones	18.00	18.00	18.00	18.00	18.00	18.00	1.00	109.00
32	(United States) Marc Landreville	18.00	18.00	18.00	18.00	0.00	18.00	18.00	108.00
33	(United States) Nate Hamilton	18.00	18.00	1.00	18.00	18.00	18.00	1.00	92.00
34	(United States) James Evans	1.00	1.00	35.00	1.00	0.00	34.00	18.00	90.00
35	(United States) Brandon Wicknick	1.00	1.00	19.00	18.00	18.00	1.00	18.00	76.00
36	(United States) Tanner Foust	18.00	19.00	0.00	0.00	0.00	0.00	36.00	73.00
37	(Canada) Mats Baribeau	1.00	18.00	0.00	18.00	0.00	18.00	1.00	56.00
38	(Canada) Dave Briggs	19.00	1.00	1.00	1.00	0.00	1.00	0.00	23.00
39	(South Korea) Joon Woo-Maeng	1.00	1.00	1.00	1.00	0.00	1.00	1.00	6.00
40	(Hungary) Nikolett Szántó	0.00	0.00	0.00	0.00	0.00	1.00	0.00	1.00
Pos	Driver	LBH	ATL	ORL	WTS	EVS	TEX	IRW	Points

=== Manufacturer Cup ===
Pos	Manufacturer	Points
1	(Japan) Scion	1113.00
2	(Japan) Nissan	640.00
3	(United States) Ford	515.00
4	(United States) Chevrolet	390.00
5	(Japan) Mazda	318.00
6	(Japan) Infiniti	229.00
7	(United States) Dodge	222.00
8	(Germany) BMW	193.00
9	(Japan) Toyota	123.00

=== Tire Cup ===
Pos	Brand	Points
1	(South Korea) Hankook	1094.00
2	(Indonesia) Achilles	696.00
3	(Japan) Nitto	673.00
4	(Japan) Falken	659.00
5	(Japan) Yokohama	652.00
6	(Chinese Taipei) Maxxis	555.00
7	(Singapore) GT Radial	356.00
