= 2017 Formula D season =

The 2017 Formula D season is the fourteenth season of the Formula D Pro Championship series and fourth season of the Pro2 series. The Pro Championship series began on March 31 at Long Beach and ended on October 14 at Irwindale Speedway with Irish driver James Deane winning his first Pro Championship.

== Teams and drivers ==
=== Pro championship ===
Tire	Team	Car	No.	Drivers	Round(s)
Achilles	Sogun Motorsports Achilles	BMW E46	84	(Hong Kong) Charles Ng	1
Achilles	Bridges Racing	Dodge Viper	43	(Republic of Ireland) Dean Kearney	All
Achilles	HGK Motorsports	BMW E46	80	(Latvia) Kristaps Blušs	All
Achilles	Perry Performance Competition	Nissan S14	11	(Canada) Marc Landerville	5, 7
Achilles	Essa Autosport	BMW E46	101	(United States) Michael Essa	All
Achilles	Jerry Yang Racing	Infiniti G37	31	(Japan) Robbie Nishida	All
Falken	Bakchis Motorsports	Nissan S14	723	(Lithuania) Aurimas Bakchis	All
Falken	DAI.	Subaru BRZ	9	(Japan) Daijiro Yoshihara	All
Falken	Worthouse Drift Team	Nissan S15	130	(Republic of Ireland) James Deane	All
Falken	Pawlak Racing	Ford Mustang	13	(United States) Justin Pawlak	All
Falken	Driftcave Motorsports	Nissan S14	777	(United States) Matt Field	All
Falken	Worthouse Drift Team	Nissan S15	215	(Poland) Piotr Więcek	All
Hankook	NOS Energy Drink Drift Team	Nissan 370Z	64	(United States) Chris Forsberg	All
Hankook	Jeff Jones Racing	Nissan S14	818	(United States) Jeff Jones	All
Hankook	Team Enjuku	Nissan 180SX	144	(United States) Nate Hamilton	1–7
Hankook	Pat Goodin Racing	Nissan S13	46	(United States) Pat Goodin	All
Hankook	Gumout, Nameless Performance, Hankook	Toyota 86	411	(United States) Ryan Tuerck	All
Nexen	Hohnadell Racing	Nissan S14	118	(United States) Alec Hohnadell	All
Nexen	Cameron Moore Drift	Toyota 86	333	(United States) Cameron Moore	1–4, 6–8
Nexen	RAD Industries	Toyota Supra	134	(United States) Dan Burkett	1–4, 6–8
Nexen	Logic Aside	BMW E92	53	(United States) Faruk Kugay	1–2, 7–8
Nexen	Papadakis Racing	Toyota Corolla iM	1	(Norway) Fredric Aasbo	All
Nexen	Jhonnattan Castro Racing	Toyota 86	717	(Dominican Republic) Jhonnattan Castro	All
Nexen	JR Motorsports	Nissan S15	200	(Finland) Juha Rintanen	1–4, 7–8
Nexen	GReddy Racing - Nexen Tire - Toyota Racing	Toyota 86	21	(Japan) Ken Gushi	All
Nexen	Kyle Mohan Racing	Mazda MX-5	99	(United States) Kyle Mohan	All
Nexen	Coffman Racing	Nissan 180SX	959	(United States) Matt Coffman	All
Nexen	Taylor Hull Racing	Nissan S14	82	(United States) Taylor Hull	2–4, 7
Nitto	Team RTS	BMW E46	949	(Peru) Alex Heilbrunn	1–4, 6–8
Nitto	Mustang RTR Drift Team	Ford Mustang RTR	88	(United States) Chelsea DeNofa	All
Nitto	Forvard Avto	Nissan S15	31	(Russia) Georgy Chivchyan	1
Nitto	Mustang RTR Drift Team	Ford Mustang RTR	25	(United States) Vaughn Gittin Jr.	All

== Schedule and results ==
Pro Championship venues

Round		Title	Venue	Date	Winner	Report
Pro	Pro2	Title	Venue	Date	Winner	Report
1		Streets of Long Beach	(California) Streets of Long Beach, Long Beach, CA	March 31 – April 1	(Republic of Ireland) James Deane	Report
	1		(Florida) Orlando Speed World, Orlando, FL	April 27 – 28	(United States) Kevin Lawrence	Report
2		Uncharted Territory	(Florida) Orlando Speed World, Orlando, FL	April 28 – 29	(Norway) Fredric Aasbø	Report
	2		(Georgia (U.S. state)) Road Atlanta, Braselton, GA	May 11 – 12	(United States) Travis Reeder	Report
3		Road to the Championship	(Georgia (U.S. state)) Road Atlanta, Braselton, GA	May 12 – 13	(Republic of Ireland) James Deane	Report
4		The Gauntlet	(New Jersey) Wall Stadium, Wall Township, NJ	June 2 – 3	(Lithuania) Aurimas Bakchis	Report
5		True North	(Quebec) Autodrome Saint-Eustache, St.Eustache, QC, Canada	July 14 – 15	(Norway) Fredric Aasbø	Report
	3		(Washington (state)) Evergreen Speedway, Monroe, WA	August 3 – 4	(United States) Matt Vankirk	Report
6		Throwdown	(Washington (state)) Evergreen Speedway, Monroe, WA	August 4 – 5	(Republic of Ireland) James Deane	Report
	4		Texas Motor Speedway, Fort Worth, TX	September 7 – 8	(United States) Kevin Lawrence	Report
7		Showdown	Texas Motor Speedway, Fort Worth, TX	September 8 – 9	(Republic of Ireland) James Deane	Report
8		Title Fight	(California) Irwindale Speedway, Irwindale, CA	October 13 – 14	(Poland) Piotr Więcek	Report

=== Calendar changes & notes ===
- On August 9, 2017, the owners of Irwindale Speedway announced that the venue will cease operations in January 2018. Formula D has held a round at the Irwindale Speedway every year since their inaugural season.

== Standings ==
=== Pro championship ===
==== Standings ====
Event winners in bold.

Pos	Driver	LBH	ORL	ATL	NJ	CAN	SEA	TEX	IRW	Points
1	(Republic of Ireland) James Deane	**106.00**	36.00	**103.00**	52.00	71.00	**107.00**	**107.00**	69.00	651.00
2	(Norway) Fredric Aasbø	52.00	**106.00**	20.00	52.00	**104.00**	84.00	68.00	52.00	538.00
3	(Lithuania) Aurimas Bakchis	68.00	20.00	19.00	**103.00**	19.00	69.00	69.00	51.00	418.00
4	(United States) Vaughn Gittin Jr.	39.00	66.00	39.00	35.00	66.00	36.00	51.00	67.00	399.00
4	(Latvia) Kristaps Blušs	35.00	35.00	69.00	68.00	86.00	36.00	36.00	34.00	399.00
6	(Japan) Daijiro Yoshihara	18.00	71.00	18.00	50.00	35.00	66.00	51.00	84.00	393.00
7	(United States) Michael Essa	35.00	84.00	38.00	84.00	18.00	36.00	36.00	36.00	367.00
8	(Poland) Piotr Więcek	35.00	34.00	51.00	18.00	36.00	51.00	36.00	**106.00**	351.00
9	(United States) Ryan Tuerck	69.00	53.00	51.00	38.00	36.00	38.00	36.00	19.00	340.00
10	(United States) Matt Coffman	52.00	19.00	35.00	68.00	35.00	51.00	38.00	18.00	316.00
11	(United States) Chris Forsberg	52.00	35.00	50.00	18.00	18.00	19.00	83.00	36.00	311.00
12	(Republic of Ireland) Dean Kearney	51.00	52.00	83.00	18.00	35.00	18.00	18.00	19.00	294.00
13	(United States) Chelsea DeNofa	18.00	19.00	36.00	39.00	36.00	51.00	51.00	39.00	289.00
14	(United States) Justin Pawlak	35.00	19.00	19.00	37.00	37.00	50.00	35.00	52.00	284.00
15	(Peru) Alex Heilbrunn	84.00	19.00	36.00	35.00	X	36.00	18.00	50.00	278.00
16	(United States) Alec Hohnadell	18.00	50.00	68.00	19.00	18.00	18.00	35.00	35.00	261.00
17	(United States) Matt Field	35.00	34.00	36.00	19.00	52.00	19.00	19.00	35.00	249.00
18	(Japan) Ken Gushi	35.00	20.00	18.00	18.00	51.00	19.00	51.00	34.00	246.00
19	(Dominican Republic) Jhonnattan Castro	18.00	50.00	19.00	18.00	19.00	34.00	34.00	34.00	226.00
20	(United States) Nate Hamilton	18.00	34.00	34.00	35.00	35.00	19.00	18.00	X	193.00
21	(United States) Jeff Jones	18.00	18.00	34.00	50.00	18.00	18.00	18.00	18.00	192.00
22	(Japan) Robbie Nishida	18.00	0.00	18.00	34.00	50.00	18.00	18.00	18.00	174.00
23	(United States) Cameron Moore	18.00	34.00	18.00	18.00	X	34.00	18.00	18.00	158.00
23	(United States) Kyle Mohan	0.00	34.00	34.00	18.00	18.00	18.00	18.00	18.00	158.00
25	(United States) Dan Burkett	18.00	19.00	18.00	19.00	X	35.00	18.00	19.00	146.00
26	(United States) Pat Goodin	18.00	18.00	18.00	18.00	18.00	18.00	18.00	19.00	145.00
27	(Finland) Juha Rintanen	35.00	19.00	18.00	35.00	X	X	18.00	0.00	125.00
28	(Canada) Marc Landreville	X	X	X	X	51.00	X	0.00	X	51.00
29	(United States) Faruk Kugay	0.00	0.00	X	X	X	X	18.00	18.00	36.00
30	(United States) Taylor Hull	X	18.00	18.00	0.00	X	X	0.00	X	36.00
31	(Russia) Georgy Chivchyan	18.00	X	X	X	X	X	X	X	18.00
Pos	Driver	LBH	ORL	ATL	NJ	CAN	SEA	TEX	IRW	Points

Notes:

- **Bold** — Round winner
- X — Did not attend event

==== Manufacturer Cup ====
Pos	Manufacturer	LBH	ORL	ATL	NJ	CAN	SEA	TEX	IRW	Points
1	(Japan) Toyota	121.00	159.00	71.00	90.00	155.00	122.00	119.00	86.00	923.00
2	(United States) Ford	74.00	85.00	91.00	76.00	103.00	101.00	102.00	119.00	751.00
3	(Germany) BMW	35.00	84.00	38.00	84.00	18.00	36.00	36.00	36.00	367.00
4	(Japan) Nissan	52.00	35.00	50.00	18.00	18.00	19.00	83.00	36.00	311.00
5	(United States) Dodge	51.00	52.00	83.00	18.00	35.00	18.00	18.00	19.00	294.00
6	(Japan) Infiniti	18.00	0.00	18.00	34.00	50.00	18.00	18.00	18.00	174.00
7	(Japan) Mazda	0.00	34.00	34.00	18.00	18.00	18.00	18.00	18.00	158.00

==== Tire Cup ====
Pos	Brand	LBH	ORL	ATL	NJ	CAN	SEA	TEX	IRW	Points
1	(Japan) Falken	174.00	107.00	154.00	155.00	123.00	176.00	176.00	190.00	**1255.00**
2	(South Korea) Nexen	104.00	156.00	103.00	120.00	155.00	135.00	119.00	87.00	**979.00**
3	(Indonesia) Achillies	86.00	136.00	152.00	152.00	137.00	72.00	72.00	70.00	**877.00**
4	(Japan) Nitto	123.00	85.00	91.00	74.00	102.00	87.00	102.00	117.00	**781.00**
5	(South Korea) Hankook	121.00	88.00	101.00	88.00	71.00	57.00	119.00	55.00	**700.00**
