= Benson Hsu =

Benson Hsu is an ex-professional drifter from the United States who competed in various auto-racing competitions. Originally known for his black Nissan "Sileighty", he is one of the earliest Americans to be involved in the sport of drifting, starting in 1999. Hsu was featured in magazines Super Street, Import Tuner, Import Racer! Drifting Magazine, Battle Magazine, Drift Tengoku and VHS/DVD videos Option Video, J.D.M. Option, Grip Video, and Pure Drifting.

As an amateur, Hsu was a Drift Association Drift Day Advanced driver, where he was an instructor and amateur drifting competition judge. In 2003, he earned his D1 Grand Prix license, and was the first driver to ever win a major amateur drift competition in the USA at Falken Drift Showoff in 2003.

In 2004, Hsu became a professional driver and competed in Formula D, finishing seventh at Sonoma Raceway and 16th at Road Atlanta. He finished second place at RS-R Drift Festival in 2004.

After retiring from professional drifting, Hsu continued to be a drifting instructor and was a drifting judge for Just Drift, Drift Buffet, Nopi Drift, Final Bout, and Super D.

Hsu is married to fellow professional drifter Nadine Hsu and they currently co-host and co-produce their drifting podcast called The SileightyMania Podcast, where they interview OGs and trailblazers from the early days of racing to current day. On the podcast, they have interviewed D1 Grand Prix drivers Toshiki Yoshioka, Robbie Nishida, and Hiroshi "Kaicho" Takahashi, and Formula Drift drivers Ken Gushi, Alex Pfeiffer, Chris Forsberg, Calvin Wan, and Tony Angelo.

== Cars driven ==
99-06 Nissan Sileighty
04-04 KAAZ White S13 Hatchback
04-05 IPS Yellow S13 Coupe
06-current Red Nissan S13 Hatchback
