= Carl Rydquist =

Swedish-American racing and stunt driver

Carl Rydquist is a Swedish-American eight-time auto racing champion (FIA, Trans-Am), a SAG-AFTRA on-camera stunt and precision driver and a Nurburgring Industry Pool driver. Rydquist beat more than 1,100 racers in a go-kart challenge created by Eurosport to promote their Super Racing Weekend FIA GT and ETCC sports coverage.

Rydquist won the Zandvoort 500 during the 2005 Dutch Winter Championship, making him the first of only three Swedish drivers to ever win this race, following three successful seasons in the Swedish Endurance Racing Cup which earned him two GT-class titles (2001 and 2004).

== Racing career ==
=== Early career 1996 – 2006 ===
Rydquist began his racing career with sports car club racing in 1996 with his father's Lotus Super Seven Replica, going on to win the Göteborg Sports Car Club racing championship in 2000. (www.svkg.se)

In February 2001, Rydquist qualified as the fastest driver during the Eurosport Super Racing Weekend Gocart Challenge. More than 1100 drivers attempted to qualify for the event. Rydquist's first-place qualifying lap-time secured him a spot in the Top 32 driver roster where the fastest six amateur challengers were invited to compete against professional racing drivers. Rydquist made it through the knockout stages along with one other challenger, Ola Gruvesäter, also from the Göteborg Sports Car Club. Rydquist won the Challenge by finishing third overall. Mercedes-Benz factory driver Peter Dumbreck won overall, with karting World Championship runner-up Fredrik Danielsson in 2nd place.

Shortly after the event Rydquist applied to test drive for a new Swedish Endurance GT racing team, Apex Racing and was selected to try out driving the team's Porsche Porsche 964 RS at the Scandiavian Raceway. The test went well and Rydquist drove the full 2001 season with the team, winning the 2001 Swedish Endurance Cup season consisting of four 8 Hour and 12 Hour races. Rydquist claimed one pole position in the rain at Kinnekulle Ring and 1 victory. In 2001, Rydquist also raced a BMW 320i in a 6 Hour Endurance race and finished second.

In 2002, Rydquist appeared at two race weekends of the one make series JTCC (Swedish Junior Touring Car Challenge). Driving MH Motorsport's third car, Rydquist finished on the podium in the final appearance after finishing fourth in the first two heats.

In 2003, Rydquist competed for two race weekends in the Radical Scandinavian Sports Racing Car Challenge, finishing on the podium in his first race. The same year Rydquist qualified an ex-BTCC BMW M3 in third place in a Swedish Endurance Racing Series event (mechanical DNF in the race).

For 2004, Rydquist was back in a Porsche for a full-time seat in the Swedish Endurance Racing Sprint Cup (3 Hour races) with MV Racing's Porsche 911 (993) RSR. Rydquist set four new class lap records, claimed two pole positions, and won three out of the six 3-hour races.

In 2005, Rydquist won the season opener in MV Racing's newly acquired Porsche 911 (996) GT3 Cup in the same series, which had now reached National Championship status, and finished second in the championship. After the season finale, Rydquist joined Loehr Racing for the 2005 Zandvoort 500 where he, Martin Morin and Bernard Loehr won the race overall in a Porsche 911 GT3 RS.

Rydquist drove one more race with MV Racing in 2006 in the team's new Porsche 911 (996) GT2 RS, winning their class.

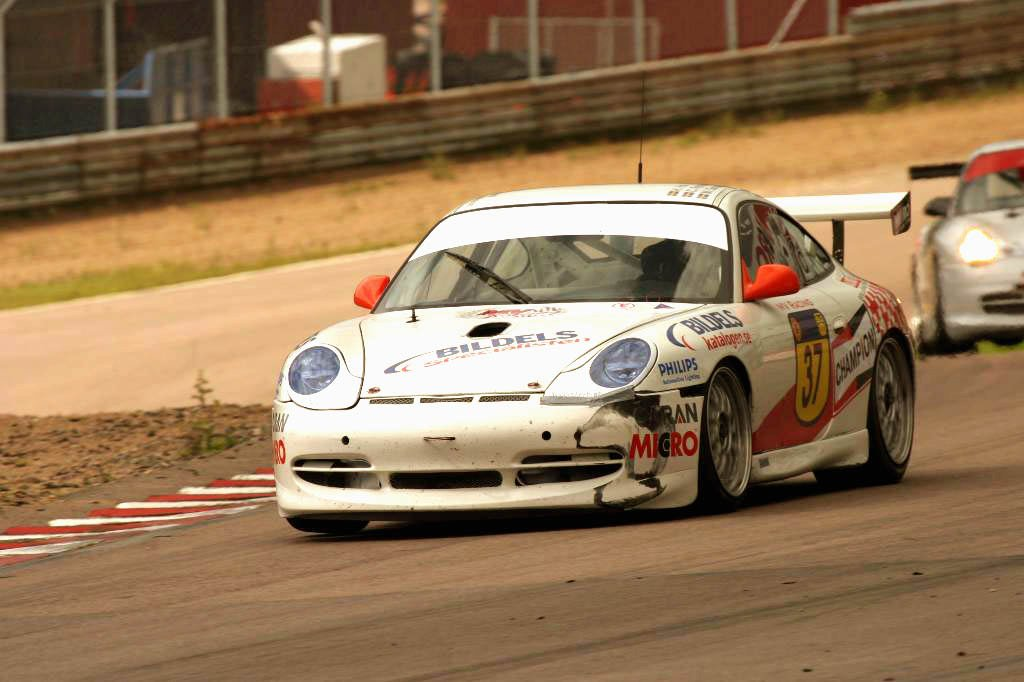
Rydquist racing in the 2005 Swedish Endurance Racing Championship

=== 2006–2011: ADAC 24 Hours of Nürburgring, Creventic ===
2006 was the first of five years that Rydquist entered the 24 Hours of Nürburgring Nordschleife, racing Levin Racing's Porsche 911 996 GT3 Cup. The team ran in the top-three in their class for most of the race but had to salvage ninth after repairing suspension damage from a night-time collision.

In 2007, the team was running in the top-ten until a teammate had an on-track accident at night. In 2008, Rydquist qualified side by side with Heinz-Harald Frentzen in a Gumpert Apollo. The team retired after 23 hours with a radiator leak. In 2009, the team landed a sponsorship contract with Hankook Tire, but their race ended with an engine problem.

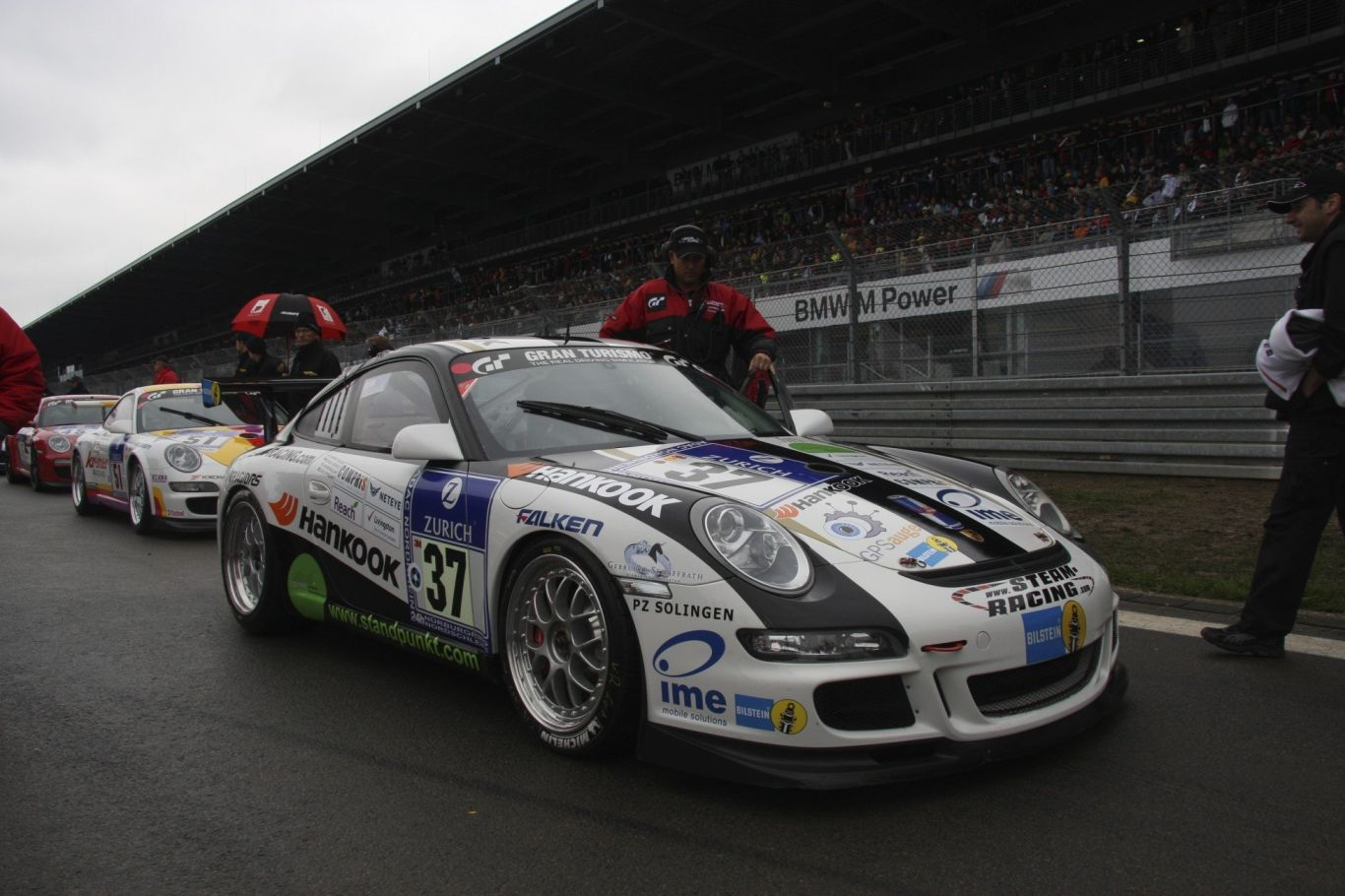
Rydquist on the grid of the 2011 24 Hours of Nürburgring

Rydquist celebrated his fifth start in the 24 Hours of Nurburgring Nordschleife race in 2011, racing a Porsche 911 (997) GT3 Cup for German Steam Racing. The team's race ended early when a co-driver had a collision.

Creventic

In September 2011 Rydquist finished 2nd in class at the 24 Hours of Barcelona (8th overall), racing a Porsche 911 (997) GT3 Cup for Steam Racing.

=== 2015–2016: VLN, Pirelli World Challenge, US Touring Car Championship ===
Following three seasons (2012–2014) of Time Attack and Formula Drift, Rydquist returned to racing.

In 2015, Rydquist joined German Mercedes-Benz dealer team Motorsport Sing piloting their SLK 350R in the VLN-series at the Nürburgring. He also joined CA Sport (Rearden Racing) for the 25 Hours of Thunderhill and finished fifth.

In 2016, Rydquist made his debut in the Pirelli World Challenge with CA Sport. It was a one-off stand-in at Circuit of the Americas with the team's #34 Nissan 370Z Nismo Touring Car. He finished third in the first race, recorded the fastest lap and started on pole in the second race. The car was retired at the halfway mark due to an oil-leak.

In 2016, Rydquist joined the California-based Prototype Development Group (Team PDG) for what would become many seasons of racing the team's FFR GTM in the National Auto Sport Association Endurance Racing Championship, ES class (GT). The team finished second in the championship in 2016, 2017 and won their class in 2018.

In the 2018 Toyo Tires 25 Hours of Thunderhill, Rydquist raced with Mike Holland, Academy Award Nominee Beau Borders and Troy Lindstrom in the team's FFR GTM featuring Hankook Tire as the title sponsor. Rydquist challenged the Toyo Tires Flying Lizard Porsche 911 (997) RSR piloted by Wolf Henzler, Johannes van Overbeek, Justin Marks, Charlie Hayes and Andy Wilzoch for the ES class pole. Rydquist and his team finished the race second in the ES (GT) class and third overall behind the Toyo Tires Porsche (ES) and One Motorsports Hankook Tire Radical SR3 (ESR).

=== 2019–2023 Trans Am Series by Pirelli, USTCC ===
In 2019–2020, Rydquist and Team PDG raced in the Super GT class of the Trans Am Series presented by Pirelli West Coast Championship. Rydquist won every race the team entered. In a rain race at Sonoma, he finished third overall behind Greg Pickett (TA) and Thomas Merrill (TA2).

In 2021, Rydquist switched to the TA2 class and won the West Coast Championship racing Nelson Racing's Ford Mustang. For the 2022 season, Rydquist joined the National TA2 Championship with Showtime Motorsports at Sebring. He finished 12th with reported brake problems. At Laguna Seca, a brake failure ended Rydquists race. At Sonoma he finished tenth. After a break, Rydquist rejoined the National TA2 series at Nashville with Nitro Motorsports. An oil-spill from a competitor's car caused a spin-out that required a brief pitstop, taking him out of contention for a top-ten finish.

At the 2023 Indycar Grand Prix of Portland event, Rydquist made a one-off re-appearance in the supporting USTCC series, racing the Optimal Stunt TA2 Chevrolet Camaro. He suffered a rear axle failure in qualifying and had to sit out the first race of the doubleheader. In the second race, Rydquist started from the pitlane but put on a clinic to claim the overall win.

== Drifting career ==
Rydquist picked up interest in drifting upon moving to California. Earning a sponsorship from City Tire Online he joined Formula D in 2009. Rydquist entered three FD competition events where he qualified for the Top 32 at Long Beach and received a One-More-Time vote in the Top 32 tandem battle against reigning FD champion Tanner Foust.

In Rydquist's second ever Formula D event at Road Atlanta, the judges requested two tandem battles between Rydquist and drifting veteran Darren MacNamara. By Round 3 in Las Vegas, Rydquist qualified seventh, outscoring prior Formula D event winners. He did not continue in Formula Drift until 2013. Driving a Nissan 350Z formerly driven by Robbie Nishida Rydquist and Berk Technology spent a season catching up on car development, and by 2014 the car was equipped with a turbo-charged Chevy LS2 V8 campaigned by Road Race Engineering. Rydquist qualified first in Pro2 and finished on the Pro2 podium at Round 3 Homestead-Miami Speedway.

== Other appearances ==
SAG Precision Driving:

Rydquist is a member of the Screen Actors Guild (SAG-AFTRA) as on-screen stunt driver, and has been hired as a precision driver in commercial shoots for multiple car manufacturers as well as magazines in Europe, the Middle East and the US. Rydquist has engaged in and attended several charities such as Grants Wishes, STOP CANCER and Reach Out World Wide.

Nürburgring EV lap record:

In 2019, Rydquist, along with (Andreas Simonsen) and (Thomas Mutsch) was identified by car magazines (Auto Motor und Sport, Car and Driver and Road & Track) as one of three drivers tasked to set an electric vehicle lap record by driving Tesla's car named Plaid.

eSports:

In 2020, Rydquist competed in the Trans Am Series presented by Pirelli eSports Championship which was broadcast live and featured a $20,000 prize purse. The sim racing championship involved drivers from all Trans Am categories (TA, TA2, SGT, GT) and championships (National, West Coast). Rydquist finished fifth in the championship points standings.

Demo driver:

In 2004–2005, Rydquist was contracted by Porsche Sweden to give high performance demo-rides at the Scandinavian Raceway during new product launches.

Time Attack:

In 2010, Rydquist won Southern California's Redline Time Attack Championship by 4 victories and 3 podium finishes piloting City Tire Online's Nissan 350Z.

In 2011, Rydquist set two new lap records and won two classes of the 2011 Super Lap Battle finals racing Santa Ana-based Berk Technology's BMW 135i. In the same car, he also won the 2011 Eurotuner GP road course shootout.

== Personal life ==
Rydquist grew up in the suburbs of Gothenburg on the Swedish West Coast. He earned a Master's degree in Mechanical Engineering from Chalmers University of Technology. Rydquist has been working as an OEM test engineer and test driver for many car companies and holds a Nürburgring Industry Pool driver permit. He resides in California.
