= James Bondurant =

American racing driver

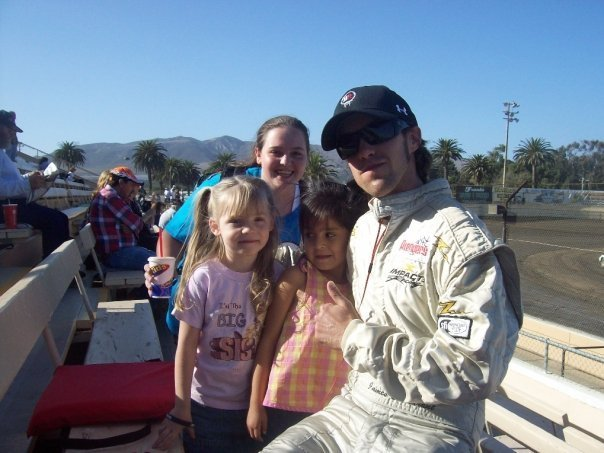
- Bondurant at a Sprint race in 2009

Formula One World Championship career
- Nationality: (United States) American
- Active years: 2000-2009
- Team(s): Team Lexus, Drift Avengers, Rudawg Racing
- Entries: 27
- Championships: 0
- Wins: 0
- Podiums: 0
- Career points: 3
- Pole positions: 0
- Fastest laps: 0
- First entry: 2000 D1gp
- Last entry: 2009 Sprint Car

Robert James Bondurant (born September 8, 1978) is a former racecar driver competing the D1GP and the Formula D circuits as a part of the Drift Avengers. Bondurant has since retired from competition but still maintains an active website. He is also the grandson of legendary racecar driver Bob Bondurant and son of Bobby Bondurant.

During his childhood James used to travel with his grandfather Bob Bondurant and developed a passion for racing, eventually ending up at the Bob Bondurant School of High Performance Driving teaching gokart racing and teaching drifting at the school.

In 2000 he was offered a spot as a part of Team Lexus driving the is400 drift car in d1gp. After failing to place he was let go from the team and picked up as the team captain of the Drift Avengers.

After being suspended from D1GP for multiple violations, James seemed to leave the world of drifting altogether, only to show up for a short time racing sprint cars in the Southern California area for Rudawg Racing.

== Retirement ==
In October 2009 James Bondurant made a post on drifting.com stating that he would retire from racing altogether to focus on other life goals.
