= Kenda Rubber Industrial Company =

Taiwanese tire manufacturer

Kenda Tires (Kenda Rubber Industrial Company)
- Native name: 建大工業股份有限公司
- Type: Public
- Industry: Automotive
- Founded: 1962; 64 years ago in Yuanlin
- Headquarters: Yuanlin, Changhua County, Taiwan
- Products: Tires for bicycles, motorcycles, ATVs, trailers, automobiles, and industrial equipment
- Brands: KENDA
- Website: www.kendatire.com

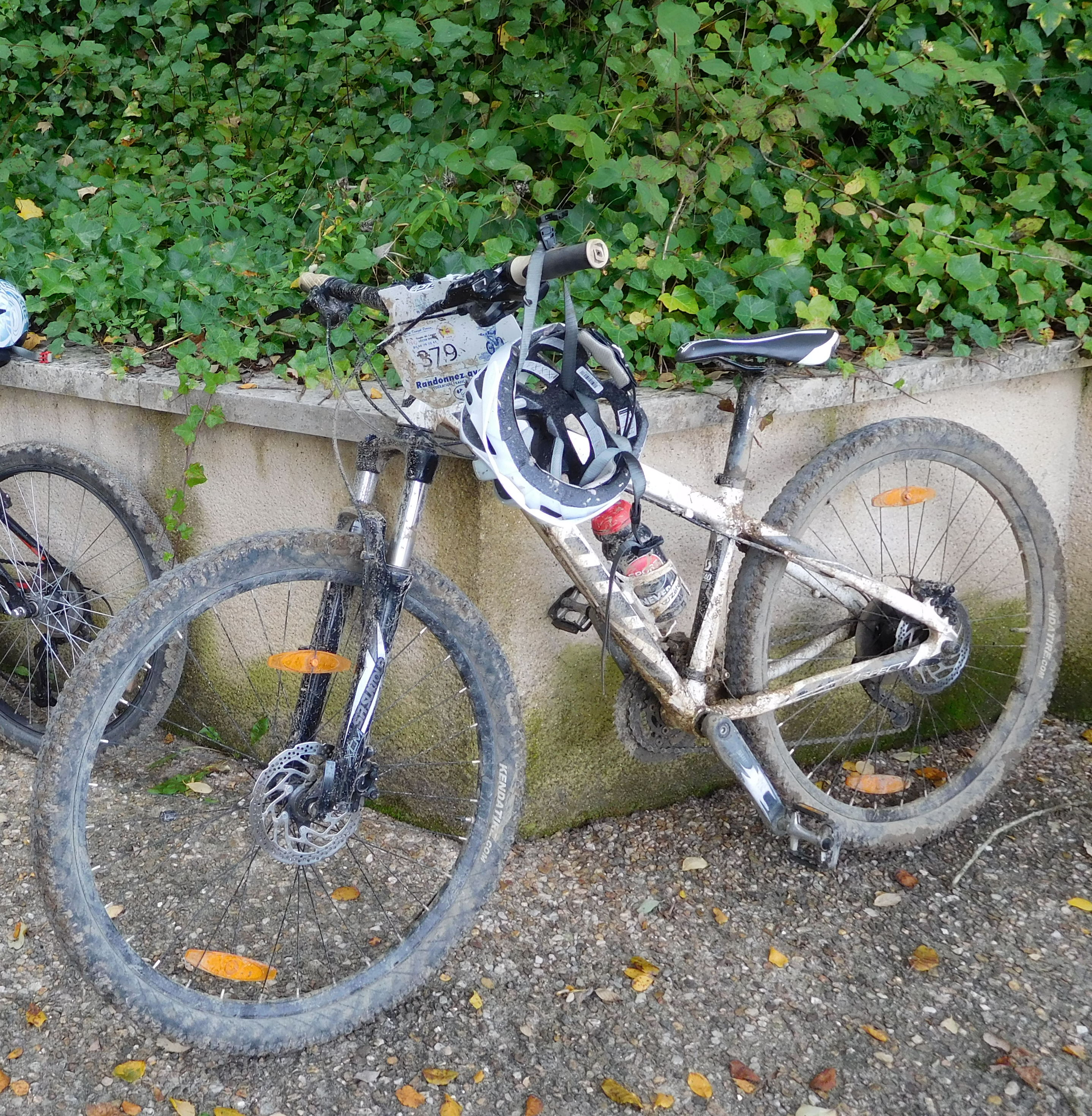
Mountain bicycle equipped with Kenda tires

Kenda Tires (Kenda Rubber Industrial Company) (Chinese: 建大工業股份有限公司; pinyin: Jiàndà Gōngyè Gǔfèn Yǒuxiàn Gōngsī) is a manufacturer of pneumatic tires in Taiwan since 1962 with manufacturing facilities in Taiwan, mainland China, Vietnam, and Indonesia. They make tires for bicycles, motorcycles, ATVs, trailers, automobiles, and industrial equipment.

Kenda was the 27th largest tire maker in the world in 2010. In 2011, Kenda decided to sell the 50-percent share that it has in the $200 million joint venture that it started with Cooper Tire & Rubber Company in China in 2003.

In 2017, Kenda expanded into Europe with its acquisition of Starco Europe A/S, a Danish supplier of wheels with $129.4 million in sales in 2017.

Kenda is a tire supplier of Formula Drift since 2023, and has sponsored Fredric Aasbø and Ryan Tuerck since 2025.

The company sponsors the Giant Asia Racing Team, a UCI Continental cycling team, the NBA's Cleveland Cavaliers, MLB's Cleveland Guardians, and the National Multiple Sclerosis Society's MS 150.

== See also ==
- List of companies of Taiwan
- List of tire companies
