= Kouichi Yamashita =

Kouchi Yamashita (山下広一, Yamashita Kouchi) is a drifting driver who in 2008 made the switch from D1 Grand Prix into the US Formula D series before moving back to Japan in 2010 to compete in the Formula Drift series there. He drove a Mazda RX-8 which was tuned with a 20B three-rotor engine producing a power of 429HP. He has achieved one victory from the D1GP series, came second place in Formula Drift Japan 2019 and won the series in 2020 for Team Weld driving a Toyota JZX100. Previously he was known for driving the Toyota AE86 and is one of the founding members of the legendary Japanese drift team Running Free.
