= Adam LZ =

American YouTuber and drifter

- Nationality: United States
- Born: Adam Lizotte-Zeisler; 5 May 1995 (age 31) Woodbury, Connecticut, U.S.

Formula D career
- Debut season: 2019
- Current team: LZMFG
- Years active: 2019–present
- Car number: 5
- Former teams: RTR Motorsports
- Wins: 2
- Podiums: 4
- Best finish: 4th in 2025

Previous series
- 2024–2025: Drift Masters

Awards
- 2020 2020: Formula D Rookie of the Year; Formula D Fan Favorite

YouTube information
- Channel: Adam LZ
- Years active: 2013–present
- Genres: Automobiles, BMX
- Subscribers: 3.9 million
- Views: 1.1 billion
- Last updated: July 17, 2026

Adam Lizotte-Zeisler (born May 5, 1995), better known as Adam LZ, is an American YouTuber, entrepreneur, and drifter, who competes in the Formula D series. Primarily creating BMX-related video content from 2013 to 2017, Lizotte-Zeisler pivoted to car and drifting-related videos in 2016. His YouTube channel has over 3 million subscribers as of July 2026.

Since 2020, Lizotte-Zeisler has competed in the Formula D drifting series, with a best finish of 4th place in 2025 and a record of 2 wins and 4 podium finishes. He also competed in the Drift Masters series from 2024 to 2025, while also becoming the first American drifter to secure a podium finish in the series during the season finale in 2024.

== Career ==
=== YouTube ===
Lizotte-Zeisler began his public career by creating content related to BMX riding while attending college at the University of Central Florida. After building an audience through riding videos, tutorials, and vlogs, he gradually shifted his focus toward automotive content as his interest in performance cars and drifting expanded. This transition coincided with the rapid growth of YouTube's automotive community, allowing his channel to reach a broader international audience.

By the mid-2010s, Lizotte-Zeisler had become known for documenting automotive projects, vehicle builds, and drifting events through a vlog-style format. His content frequently features the acquisition, modification, and maintenance of performance vehicles, with an emphasis on Japanese sports cars, particularly Nissan S-chassis models, BMW E-chassis models, alongside other European and American performance vehicles. His videos regularly chronicle track days, competitive drifting, shop operations, and collaborations with other automotive creators and professional drivers.

=== Formula Drift ===
Since 2020, Lizotte-Zeisler has competed in professional drifting events, earning a professional drifting license and competing in sanctioned series, most notably Formula D, while continuing to produce content documenting his racing activities and automotive projects. After a rookie season with his own independent team piloting a Nissan S15 Silvia, Lizotte-Zeisler was awarded the 2020 Formula D Rookie of the Year and Fan Favorite awards. During the season, he had secured a top-four and top-eight finish, and finished the season in 12th place.

=== Other ventures ===
As his online presence grew, Lizotte-Zeisler expanded his activities beyond digital media by establishing an automotive merchandise business under the LZMFG and Drift HQ brands, and developing a dedicated workshop in Orlando, Florida to support vehicle fabrication, maintenance, and content production.

Lizotte-Zeisler has also collaborated with manufacturers, aftermarket automotive companies, and motorsports organizations through sponsorships, promotional campaigns, and event appearances. Lizotte-Zeisler has also hosted the Adam LZ World Tour annually since 2024, a drifting competition and motorsports event hosted in multiple countries including the United States, Canada, and the United Kingdom. His participation in major automotive gatherings—including drift competitions, car festivals, and racing events such as TX2K—has contributed to his prominence within the performance automotive community.
