= Fredric Aasbø =

Norwegian racing driver

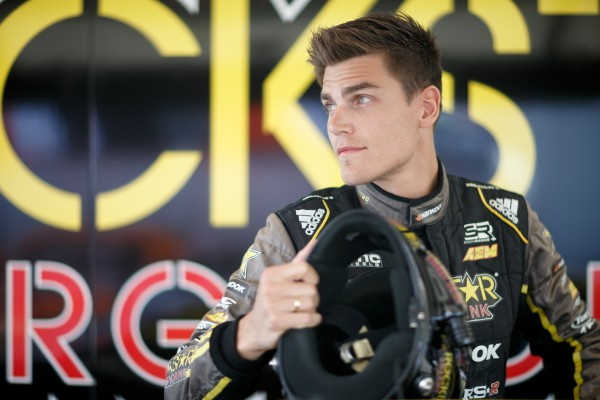
- Aasbø in 2015
- Nationality: Norwegian
- Born: 18 August 1985 (age 41) Siggerud, Norway

Formula D career
- Current team: Papadakis Racing
- Championships: 3
- Wins: 20
- Best finish: 1st in 2015, 2021, 2022

Championship titles
- 2007 2008 2014 2015 2021 2022: Nordic Drifting Championship; Nordic Drifting Championship; Formula D Asia; Formula D Formula D Formula D

Awards
- 2010 2015: Formula D Rookie of the Year; FIA Norway Driver of the Year

Fredric Aasbø (born 18 August 1985) is a professional drifter and stunt driver originally from Siggerud, Norway. He currently competes in the Formula Drift Championship.

Aasbø is a three-time Formula Drift champion, having won the title in 2015, 2021, and 2022. He also holds claim to the most wins of any driver in series history, with 20 (as of April 2025). He also finished as runner-up in the 2014, 2016, 2017, 2018, and 2019 seasons. Aasbø has also won two consecutive Nordic Drifting Championships in 2007 and 2008, as well as the Formula Drift Asia championship in 2014.

== Career ==
Aasbø started his career as a privateer racer driving a Toyota Supra. He won the 2007 and 2008 Nordic Drifting Championship titles competing in his native Scandinavia before making his U.S. debut at a global drifting invitational in 2008.

In 2012, Aasbø won the "Pro" category of the Toyota Pro/Celebrity Race.

=== Formula D ===
In 2010, Aasbø ran his first full season of U.S. competition as a privateer and won the Formula Drift 'Rookie of the Year' award.

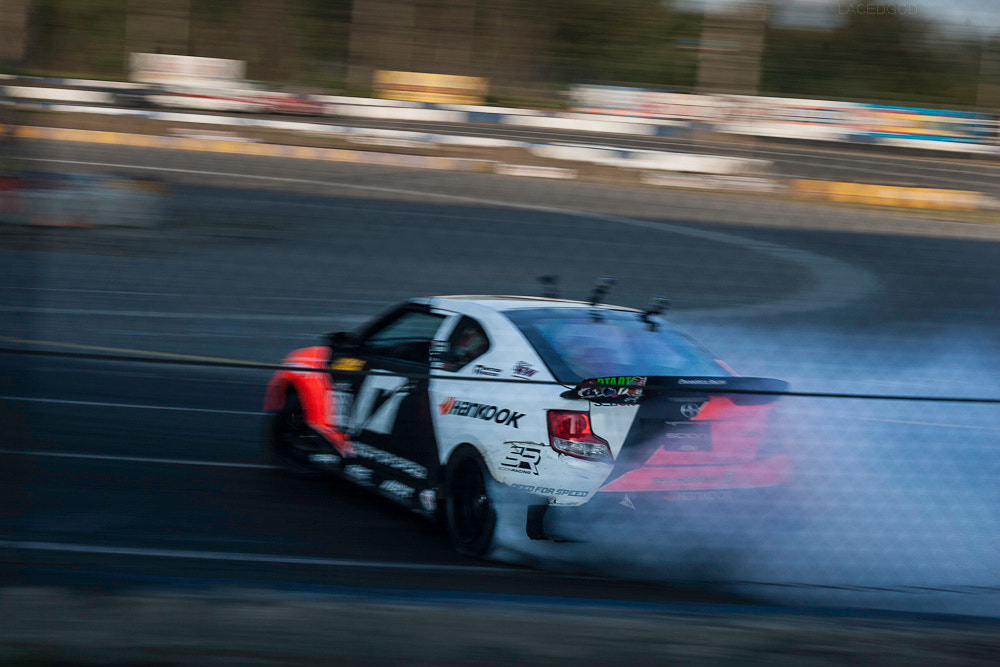
Aasbø drifting in 2012

Aasbø joined the Papadakis Racing squad in 2011 as a replacement for driver Tanner Foust (who had announced his departure from drifting). From 2011 to 2016, he drove a Scion tC in the United States and later, a Toyota GT86 in Europe.

In 2014, Aasbø won the Formula Drift Asia title, and finished runner-up in the U.S. Formula Drift Pro Championship.

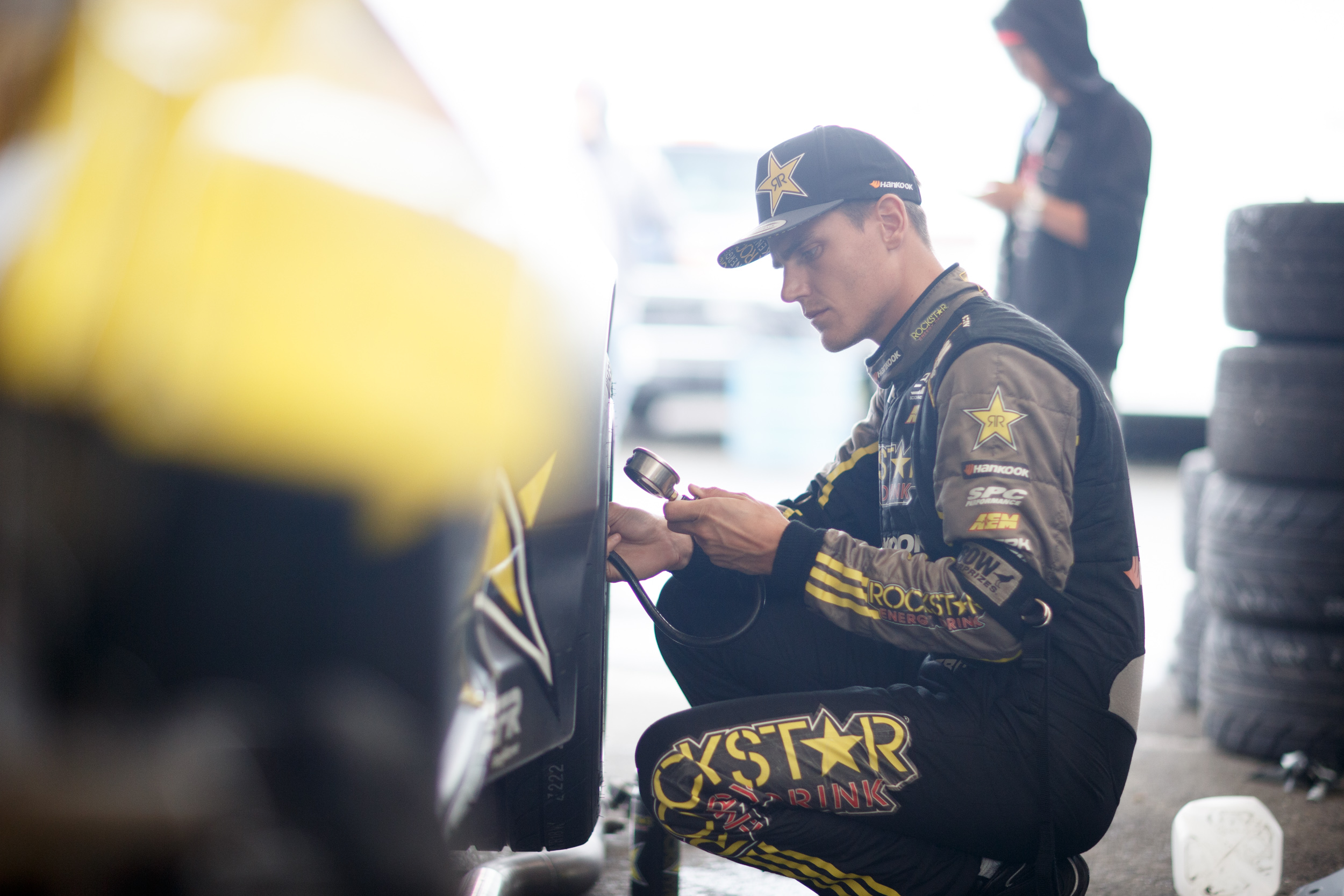
Aasbø checking tire pressures on his Rockstar Energy Drink Scion tC in 2015

In 2015, Aasbø and Papadakis Racing announced that Rockstar Energy would be their title sponsor. He won the 2015 Formula Drift Pro championship with a record of four wins in seven rounds, as well as the first-ever Formula Drift World Championship title in the Papadakis Racing Scion tC. The same year, he was also awarded FIA's Driver of the Year for Norway – an honor he accepted from Norwegian World Rally Champion Petter Solberg.

Aasbø finished as championship runner-up in 2016 after winning two rounds.

From 2017 to 2018, Aasbø debuted two different Toyota hatchbacks in the Formula Drift series. In 2017, he finished second in the championship in a Toyota Corolla iM. In 2018, Papadakis Racing introduced the Rockstar Energy Drink / Nexen Tire Toyota Corolla Hatchback and again finished as the championship runner-up. For the fourth year in a row, Aasbø finished as the championship runner-up in Formula D for the 2019 season.

In 2020, Aasbø and Papadakis Racing launched their new Toyota GR Supra for the 2020 Formula D season onwards. The GR Supra is powered by a B58 engine producing over 1000 horsepower while still utilizing the stock block.

Aasbø won the 2021 Formula D championship, after having a podium finish or win in all but two rounds of the season - a total of one win and five podium finishes.

For a second consecutive year, Aasbø won the 2022 Formula D championship, with two wins and two podium finishes during the season.

Aasbø scored three podium finishes in 2023, and finished the season in 6th place.

For the 2024 season, Aasbø scored one win and three podium finishes, and finished the season in third place. With a win and three podium finishes, Aasbø finished again in third place for the 2025 season.

== Other work ==
Aasbø is also a stunt driver whose work has most notably been featured in the Norwegian action film Børning and advertisement campaigns for Toyota.

Aasbø's wife Hunter Taylor is now a rookie drifter as well.
