= Formula D =

Auto racing series

Formula DRIFT
- Logo used from June 30, 2015
- Category: Drifting
- Country: United States
- Inaugural season: 2004
- Classes: PRO; PROSPEC
- Manufacturers: (United States) Ford; (Japan) Toyota; (United States) Chevrolet; (Germany) BMW; (Japan) Nissan; (United States) Cadillac; (Japan) Mazda; (Italy) Ferrari; (United States) Dodge
- Tire suppliers: (Japan) Nitto Tire; (Singapore) GT Radial; (Chinese Taipei) Kenda Tires; (China) Vitour Tires; (South Korea) Nexen Tire; (South Korea) Kumho Tire
- Drivers' champion: PRO; 2026 (Republic of Ireland) Conor Shanahan; PROSPEC; 2026 (United States) Dmitriy Brutskiy
- Official website: www.formulad.com

Formula DRIFT (also known as Formula D or FD) is an American premier professional drifting series that was co-founded by Jim Liaw and Ryan Sage in 2003 as a sister company to Slipstream Global Marketing, which had the same partnership that introduced D1 Grand Prix to the United States. Formula D does not include emphasized speed, but the new entity would solely own, operate and launch the first official drifting series in North America. Formula DRIFT is not associated with the FIA series of formula racing championships.

Formula DRIFT has 84 licensed drivers competing in PRO and PROSPEC (formerly PRO 2) as of June 2024. The series consists of an eight-round championship played out at race tracks across North America. Formula DRIFT is judged on line, angle, and style, where all contestants start with 100 points, and take away said points for mistakes. The hosts will honor an eight-round competition across the U.S.A., and also offer a car show called Offset Kings. Formula DRIFT expanded its presence into being a franchise. It is challenged into head-to-head battles, and total results, rather than who finishes the course in the fastest time.

== North America ==
Drivers in North America can compete in regionally sanctioned PRO/AM organizations for licensing.

- USDrift – Mid-Atlantic
- East10Drift – Southeast
- Evergreen Drift – Pacific Northwest
- Colorado Drift – Colorado
- ND Drift – Minnesota
- Southwest Drift – Las Vegas
- Spec-D Drift series – Bincent Shreklund
- Hot Pit Autofest – California
- Full Lock Drift – Oklahoma
- US Drift Circuit – Florida
- Great Lakes – Pennsylvania

Winners and high finishers of these feeders series are then able to enter the Formula DRIFT PROSPEC series, a secondary national tour where drivers compete to move up to the main series.

== Tracks ==
=== Current tracks ===
- Long Beach Street Circuit in Long Beach, California. (2006–2019, 2021–present, second round 2025-present)
- (Georgia (U.S. state)) Road Atlanta in Braselton, Georgia. (2004–2019, 2021–present)
- Orlando Speed World in Orlando, Florida. (2015–2019, 2021–present)
- Stafford Speedway in Stafford Springs, Connecticut. (2026)
- Lucas Oil Indianapolis Raceway Park in Brownsburg, Indiana. (2026)
- (Washington (state)) Evergreen Speedway in Monroe, Washington. (2006–present)
- Las Vegas Motor Speedway in Las Vegas, Nevada. (2008–2012, 2026)

=== Former tracks ===
- Reliant Park in Houston, Texas. (2004–2005)
- Sonoma Raceway in Sonoma, California. (2004–2013)
- Irwindale Speedway in Irwindale, California. (2004–2024)
- Wall Speedway in Wall, New Jersey. (2005–2007, 2009–2019)
- Soldier Field in Chicago, Illinois. (2005–2006)
- Summit Point Motorsports Park in Summit Point, West Virginia. (2007)
- Old Bridge Township Raceway Park in Englishtown, New Jersey. (2008, 2021–2025)
- Sonoma Raceway in Sonoma, California. (2005–2010)
- Palm Beach International Raceway in Palm Beach, Florida. (2011–2013)
- Texas Motor Speedway in Fort Worth, Texas. (2013–2020)
- Homestead–Miami Speedway in Homestead, Florida. (2014)
- (Japan) Fuji Speedway in Oyama, Shizuoka. (2015)
- Autodrome Saint-Eustache in Saint-Eustache, Quebec. (2015–2017)
- Wild Horse Pass Motorsports Park in Chandler, Arizona. (2016)
- World Wide Technology Raceway in Madison, Illinois. (2018–2025)
- Lake Erie Speedway in Erie, Pennsylvania. (2021)
- Utah Motorsports Campus in Grantsville, Utah. (2022–2025)

==== Sister series ====
Formula DRIFT Asia. Formula DRIFT Asia was created in 2008 with the inaugural FD Singapore competition. The first real international competition of its in Asia, held at the Changi Air Show Grounds. This historic event was sold out before the gates opened. Since then, Formula Drift Asia became its own championship series, the first Pan-Asian professional drifting championship. In 2009 and 2010, the Championship made stops in Singapore, Thailand and Malaysia. For the 2011/2012 Championship tour, Formula DRIFT Asia added an additional stop in Indonesia.

- Rd.1 Marina Bay Street Circuit, Marina Bay, Singapore Season 2010
- Rd.2 Bangkok Wonderworld, Bangkok, Thailand Season 2010
- Rd.3 Dataran Merdeka, Kuala Lumpur, Malaysia. Season 2010

The first Formula DRIFT Asia Champion was (Malaysia) Tengku Djan.

==== Exhibition events ====
- March 18, 2011, Formula Drift Ultimate Challenge – Qatar Racing Club
- (United Arab Emirates) February 25, 2011, Formula Drift UAE Invitational Competition – Yas Marina Circuit
- (Panama) February 5, 2012, Demonstration – Figali Convention Center
- May 27, 2012, International Competition – Location TBD
- (United States) June 11, 2011, Formula Drift Ultimate Challenge at Texas Motor Speedway, Fort Worth, Texas
- (United Arab Emirates) February 25, 2011, Yas Marina Circuit, Abu Dhabi, UAE
- (Panama) February 12, 2011, Figali Convention Center, Ciudad de Panamá, Panamá
- (Panama) January 17, 2010, Figali Convention Center, Ciudad de Panamá, Panamá
- (Panama) March 8, 2009, Figali Convention Center, Ciudad de Panamá, Panamá
- August 23, 2008, Autódromo Monterrey, Monterrey, Mexico
- April 27, 2008, Changi Air Show Grounds, Singapore
- January 18–19, 2025, ICC Tainan, Tainan, Taiwan

== Regulations ==
=== Car eligibility ===
Cars and their builds are constantly under review by the Formula DRIFT staff. The rule book is revised every year to promote fair and exciting drifting. Some cars and practices are written out of the rule book in order to keep a realistic and level playing field. During the 2004 season, the Dodge Viper Competition Coupe was permitted to compete; subsequently it was ineligible in Formula DRIFT.

Although Formula DRIFT does not permit front-wheel drive cars, it does allow all-wheel drive cars to be converted to rear wheel drive, such as the Subaru WRX and Mitsubishi EVO. In the United States, the Scion tC is sold only in the FWD layout, but because it shares the same chassis as the AWD Toyota Avensis (sold only in the United Kingdom and Europe), it can be converted to a competition-ready RWD layout. This change sparked great debate between drifters in the series who felt that an original FWD vehicle should not be eligible due to the front cross member changes needed.

A trademark of Formula DRIFT competition cars is the very open engine rulebook. Formula DRIFT allows engines from other manufacturers to be swapped into competition cars. "Engine, transmission, ECU and/or final drive modifications are free, but only the rear wheels may propel the vehicle". This results in a huge variety of engine/chassis combinations as well as huge power outputs commonly in excess of 850+ whp. Vehicles wishing to compete for the Manufacturers Championship must use an engine from the same manufacturer as the chassis. Engine swaps remain very common with older models but can be seen with new builds as well. Naturally aspirated or supercharged first, second, third, fourth, and fifth generation Chevrolet small block V8 engines are often used because of their availability and lower operating costs, especially with their ability to produce torque, lower RPM's, parts availability, and ease of rebuilding.

Suspension modification is widely open to development as long as stock pickup locations are utilized. Suspension tuning is a vital part of any successful Formula DRIFT team.

To keep cars in check Formula DRIFT institutes a maximum tire size based on the vehicles total weight.

Formula DRIFT cars are given fixed numbers for their cars and are not necessarily based on rankings.

=== Scoring and judging ===
Formula DRIFT uses its own scoring system that may differ from other drifting organizations. Often scoring systems for qualifying, tandem battles, and penalties are different.

Qualifying – Formula DRIFT competitors are allowed two non-consecutive judged solo runs to post their highest possible score in order to compete. The top 32 drivers with the highest qualifying scores are entered in a competition bracket pairing the highest scoring drivers against the lowest scoring drivers. 1st v. 32nd, 2nd v. 31st, 3rd v. 30th, etc. The drivers are judged on line, speed, angle, and overall impact. The judges can also make additional request at the drivers meeting for actions or techniques that will weigh in their decision making (ex; entry technique, racing line, proximity, etc.). Formula DRIFT drivers are scored on a points-deduction system where every driver will start their judged run with a perfect score of 100 pts. For every mistake, points will be deducted. These points will vary between .25 point to the most severe mistakes 1.75.

Competition – The top 32 qualifying drivers are paired up in an elimination bracket pairing the highest scoring drivers against the lowest scoring drivers. The biggest difference from qualifying is that now drivers face off head to head on the track in a tandem battle. The two cars run together side by side, each driver trying to show greater skill than the other. The highest qualifying driver leads on the first run, then on the second run the lower qualifying driver leads. Drivers are judged on the same basic criteria as qualifying but an emphasis is put on the interaction between the two drivers competing head to head. The lead driver will set the pace and driving line often trying to produce a gap between themselves and the following driver. The following driver will try to stay on top of the lead driver as close as possible without making contact with their vehicle. The goal is to mimic or "shadow" the lead drivers run while staying on their door throughout the run. It is possible for either driver to win either run. Often one driver will have a points advantage going into the second run. Driver mistakes (ex. 2 wheels off course, spinning out, avoidable contact, etc.) can also cause them to be given an automatic zero. The three-judge panel then will look at both runs and determine one of three outcomes; Driver 1 advances, Driver 2 advances, or if a winner can not be determined a "One More Time" will be called. In the event of a "One More Time" the drivers will then complete a new pair of runs. The drivers will face off again until a winner can be determined. The winner advance to the next bracket.

Competition Time Out – Drivers have a one-time option to utilize a "Competition Time Out" in order to attempt to fix their vehicle. In the event that a driver or car can not come to the start line in time for their tandem run the other driver will be allowed to run a solo lap to advance.

Overtaking – Follow cars are permitted to overtake or pass in certain instances. passes may only happen at inside clips, and can only be done so if the lead car is off line enough to allow the follow car to pass between them and the clip. If a successful pass is made the lead car run is deemed a zero.

The current judges are Robbie Nishida (2023–), Brian Eggert (2012–), Chris Uhl (2020–). Kevin Wells is the Competition Director for the series.

=== 2026 Format Restructure ===
Following a democratic majority vote during driver summits, the PRO Championship officially eliminated the head-to-head tandem Seeding Bracket format ahead of the 2026 season, returning to the classic individual Two-Run Qualifying layout to determine the final Top 32 bracket placement. Conversely, the developmental PROSPEC Championship voted to retain the tandem seeding system to prioritize maximizing competitive track and tandem seat time for its drivers.

== Formula DRIFT Champions ==
=== United States ===
Season	Driver	Car
2004	(Sweden) Samuel Hübinette	Dodge Viper Competition Coupe
2005	(New Zealand) Rhys Millen	Holden Monaro
2006	(Sweden) Samuel Hübinette	Dodge Viper SRT-10
2007	(United States) Tanner Foust	Nissan 350Z
2008	(United States) Tanner Foust	Nissan 350Z
2009	(United States) Chris Forsberg	Nissan 350Z
2010	(United States) Vaughn Gittin Jr.	Ford Mustang
2011	(Japan) Daijiro Yoshihara	Nissan 240SX
2012	(Japan) Daigo Saito	Lexus SC430
2013	(United States) Michael Essa	BMW M3
2014	(United States) Chris Forsberg	Nissan 370Z
2015	(Norway) Fredric Aasbø	Scion tC
2016	(United States) Chris Forsberg	Nissan 370Z
2017	(Republic of Ireland) James Deane	Nissan Silvia S15
2018	(Republic of Ireland) James Deane	Nissan Silvia S15
2019	(Republic of Ireland) James Deane	Nissan Silvia S15
2020	(United States) Vaughn Gittin Jr.	Ford Mustang RTR
2021	(Norway) Fredric Aasbø	Toyota Supra
2022	(Norway) Fredric Aasbø	Toyota Supra
2023	(United States) Chelsea DeNofa	Ford Mustang RTR
2024	(Republic of Ireland) James Deane	Ford Mustang RTR
2025	(Republic of Ireland) James Deane	Ford Mustang RTR
2026	(Republic of Ireland) Conor Shanahan	Toyota GT86

Note: (United States) Chris Forsberg was the first driver to win 3 championships (2009, 2014 and 2016). The second to win 3 championships was (Republic of Ireland) James Deane, and the third was (Norway) Fredric Aasbø (2015, 2021, and 2022). Although he was the second to win 3 championships, Deane is the first and so far only Formula DRIFT driver who managed to win 3 championships in a row (2017, 2018 and 2019). Deane also became the first and so far only Formula DRIFT driver to win 5 championship titles (2017, 2018, 2019, 2024 and 2025).

=== Asia ===
Season	Driver	Car
2009	(Malaysia) Tengku Djan	Bridgestone Malaysia Nissan S15
2010	(Malaysia) Tengku Djan	Bridgestone Malaysia FXOpen Nissan S15
2011	(Japan) Daigo Saito	Achilles Radial Toyota Altezza
2012	(Japan) Daigo Saito	Achilles Radial Lexus IS C
2013	(Japan) Daigo Saito	Achilles Radial Lexus IS C
2014	(Norway) Fredric Aasbø	RSR Toyota 86
2018	(New Zealand) "Mad" Mike Whiddett	RedBull Racing Mazda RX-7
2019	(Scotland) Andrew Gray	Moty's Toyota Chaser (JZX100)
2020	(Japan) Kouichi Yamashita	Team WELD Toyota Mark II (JZX100)
2021	(Japan) Kouichi Yamashita	Team WELD Toyota Mark II (JZX100)

=== Japan ===
Season	Driver	Car
2015	(Scotland) Andrew Gray	Toyota Chaser (JZX100)
2016	(Scotland) Andrew Gray	Toyota Chaser (JZX100)
2017	(Scotland) Andrew Gray	Toyota Chaser (JZX100)
2018	(New Zealand) "Mad" Mike Whiddett	Mazda RX-7 (FD3S)
2019	(Scotland) Andrew Gray	Toyota Mark II (JZX100)
2020	(Japan) Kouichi Yamashita	Toyota Mark II (JZX100)
2021	(Japan) Kouichi Yamashita	Toyota Mark II (JZX100)
2022	(Japan) Hokuto Matsuyama	Toyota GR86 (ZN8)
2023	(Japan) KANTA (Kanta Yanagi)	Toyota Chaser (JZX100)
2024	(Japan) Kouichi Yamashita	BMW M3 (E92)
2025	(Japan) Kazumi Takahashi	BMW M3 (E92)
2026	(Japan) Koudai Sobagiri	Toyota GR86 (ZN8)

=== PROSPEC Champions ===
Season	Driver	Car
2014	(United States) Dan Savage	Sikky / Achilles Tire Mazda RX-8
2015	(Peru) Alex Heilbrunn	MonsterBMW BMW M3
2016	(Canada) Marc Landerville	Perry Performance Nissan 240SX
2017	(United States) Kevin Lawrence	Enjuku Racing / Hankook / BC Racing Nissan S14
2018	(United States) Travis Reeder	Nissan S13
2019	(United States) Trenton Beechum	Clonex Racing Nexen Tire Motorsport Ford Mustang
2020	(Belarus) Dmitriy Brutskiy	Essa Autosport / Never Settle Drift BMW E46
2021	(Belarus) Dmitriy Brutskiy	Essa Autosport / Never Settle Drift BMW E46
2022	(United States) Robert Thorne	ASM BMW E46
2023	(United States) Ben Hobson	Feal Suspension / Pedal Commander Nissan Silvia S14
2024	(Canada) Tommy Lemaire	XPN Nissan Silvia S14
2025	(United States) Cody Buchanan	SRD Auto / Bumz Eyewear Nissan 370Z
2026	(Belarus) Dmitriy Brutskiy	Essa Autosport / Never Settle Drift BMW E46

== Honors ==
=== Rookie of the Year ===
- 2005 (United States) Mike Peters – Chevrolet El Camino
- 2006 (United States) Bill Sherman – Nissan 240SX
- 2007 (Republic of Ireland) Darren McNamara – Toyota Corolla Coupe GT/Nissan SR20
- 2008 (Japan) Michihiro Takatori – Nissan Skyline ER34
- 2009 (Republic of Ireland) Eric O'Sullivan – Subaru Impreza WRX STI
- 2010 (Norway) Fredric Aasbø – Toyota Supra JZA80
- 2011 (Lithuania) Aurimas "Odi" Bakchis – Nissan Silvia S14
- 2012 (Japan) Daigo Saito – Lexus SC430
- 2013 (Canada) Mats Baribeau – Toyota Mark II
- 2014 (South Korea) Geoff Stoneback – Nissan Silvia S14
- 2015 (Japan) Masashi Yokoi – Nissan Silvia S15
- 2016 (Peru) Alex Heilbrunn – BMW E46 M3
- 2017 (Poland) Piotr Wiecek – Nissan Silvia S15
- 2018 (United States) Dirk Stratton – Chevy Corvette
- 2019 (United States) Travis Reeder – Nissan 240SX
- 2020 (United States) Adam LZ – Nissan Silvia S15
- 2021 (Norway) Simen Olsen – Toyota GR Supra
- 2022 (United States) Mike Power – Nissan Silvia S15
- 2023 (United States) Robert Thorne – BMW E46
- 2024 (Japan) Hiroya Minowa - Toyota GT86
- 2025 (Republic of Ireland) Jack Shanahan – BMW 1 Series E82

=== Most Improved Driver ===
- 2007 (United States) Bill Sherman – Nissan 240SX
- 2008 (France) Stephan Verdier – Subaru Impreza WRX STI
- 2009 (France) Stephan Verdier – Cooper Tire Subaru Impreza WRX STi
- 2010 (New Zealand) "Mad" Mike Whiddett – Mazda RX-8
- 2011 (United States) Matt Powers – Nissan 240SX
- 2012 (Japan) Robbie Nishida – Lexus SC300
- 2013 (Republic of Ireland) Darren McNamara – Nissan Silvia S14
- 2014 (Republic of Ireland) Dean "Karnage" Kearney – Dodge Neon
- 2015 (United States) Alec Hohnadell – Nissan Silvia S14
- 2018 (United States) Matt Field – Chevy C6 Corvette
- 2019 (United States) Ryan Litteral – Nissan 350Z
- 2020 (United States) Taylor Hull – Cadillac ATS
- 2021 (United States) Matt Field – Chevy C6 Corvette
- 2022 (Japan) Ken Gushi – Toyota GR86
- 2023 (Norway) Simen Olsen – Nissan Silvia S15
- 2024 (United States) Adam LZ – BMW 2J E36

=== Driver of the Year ===
- 2007 (United States) Chris Forsberg
- 2008 (United States) Ryan Tuerck
- 2009 (United States) Chris Forsberg
- 2013 (Norway) Fredric Aasbø

=== Hardest Charging Driver ===
- 2007 (United States) Chris Forsberg
- 2008 (Japan) Robbie Nishida
- 2010 (Norway) Fredric Aasbø
- 2011 (United States) Matt Powers
- 2012 (Japan) Daigo Saito
- 2013 (Japan) Robbie Nishida
- 2014 (United States) Chelsea DeNofa
- 2017 (Dominican Republic) Jhonnattan Castro
- 2018 (United States) Chelsea DeNofa
- 2019 (Poland) Piotr Wiecek
- 2020 (United States) Chelsea DeNofa
- 2021 (United States) Matt Field

=== Spirit of Drifting ===
- 2007 (South Korea) Joon Maeng
- 2008 (United States) Patrick Mordaunt
- 2009 (Japan) Taka Aono
- 2011 (United States) Walker Wilkerson
- 2012 (United States) Danny George
- 2013 (Japan) Robbie Nishida
- 2014 (United States) Forrest Wang
- 2015 (Japan) Ken Gushi
- 2018 (United States) Michael Essa
- 2019 (United States) Pat Goodin
- 2020 (United States) Jeff Jones / Rome Charpentier (tie)
- 2021 (United States) Jeff Jones

=== Best Drifting Style ===
- 2008 (Japan) Daijiro Yoshihara
- 2011 (Japan) Daijiro Yoshihara
- 2012 (Norway) Fredric Aasbø
- 2013 (Japan) Daigo Saito
- 2018 (United States) Forrest Wang
- 2019 (United States) Chelsea DeNofa
- 2020 (United States) Chris "The Fors" Forsberg
- 2021 (United States) Chelsea DeNofa
- 2022 (United States) Chelsea DeNofa
- 2023 (Norway) Fredric Aasbø

=== Best Personal Style ===
- 2011 (United States) Matt Powers
- 2012 (United States) Ryan Tuerck
- 2013 (United States) Matt Powers
- 2014 (United States) Ryan Tuerck

=== Crew Member of the Year ===
- 2011 (Japan) Mike Kojima
- 2012 (Japan) Mike Kojima
- 2014 (United States) Brian Wilkerson
- 2015 (United States) Nathan Tasukon
- 2018 (United States) Stan Williams
- 2019 (United States) Jimmie Cadwell
- 2020 (United States) Jason Dixon
- 2021 (United States) Greg Leone

=== Team Manager of the Year ===
- 2010 (United States) Jonathon Bradford
- 2011 (United States) Chris Forsberg
- 2012 (Greece) Stephan Papadakis
- 2013 (United States) Michael Essa
- 2014 (Greece) Stephan Papadakis
- 2015 (United States) Kenji Sumino
- 2018 (Greece) Stephan Papadakis
- 2019 (Greece) Stephan Papadakis
- 2020 (Greece) Stephan Papadakis
- 2021 (Greece) Stephan Papadakis
- 2023 (Greece) Stephan Papadakis
- 2024 (United States) Christina Jones

=== Comeback of the Year ===
- 2011 (New Zealand) Rhys Millen
- 2013 (United States) Michael Essa
- 2015 (Republic of Ireland) Dean Kearney
- 2018 (United States) Matt Coffman
- 2019 (United States) Ryan Tuerck
- 2024 (United States) Adam LZ

=== Fan Favorite ===
- 2011 (United States) Walker Wilkerson
- 2013 (Norway) Fredric Aasbø
- 2014 (Norway) Fredric Aasbø
- 2018 (Republic of Ireland) James Deane
- 2019 (United States) Matt Field
- 2020 (United States) Adam LZ
- 2021 (United States) Chelsea DeNofa
- 2022 (United States) Adam LZ
- 2023 (United States) Adam LZ

== Drivers list ==
=== 2024 ===
==== PRO ====
Driver name	Team name	Car number	Rank	Points	Country	Car	Tires	Rookie
Adam LZ	LZMFG	5	3	100	United States	BMW E36	G GT Radial	
Alec Robbins	Alec Robbins Racing	35	23	238	United States	Nissan 350Z	K Kenda	
Aurimas Bakchis	Bakchis Motorsports	723	2	548	Lithuania	Nissan Silvia S15	G GT Radial	
Branden Sorensen	Sorensen Motorsports	513	10	364	United States	BMW E46	N Nitto	
Chris Forsberg	Forsberg Racing	64	13	350	United States	Nissan Z	G GT Radial	
Daniel Stuke	Mspek Performance	527	24	224	United States	Nissan Silvia S15	V Vitour	
Dean Kearney	Team Karnage	43	39	28	(Republic of Ireland) Ireland	Dodge Viper	K Kumho	
Diego Higa	Diego Higa Racing Team	169	25	224	Brazil	Toyota GT86	G GT Radial	
Dylan Hughes	Team DHR	129	9	378	United States	BMW E46	G GT Radial	
Forrest Wang	Get Nuts Lab	808	35	112	United States	Nissan S15	V Vitour	
Fredric Aasbo	Papadakis Racing	151	3	520	Norway	Toyota GR Supra	N Nitto	
James Deane	RTR Motorsports	130	1	666	(Republic of Ireland) Ireland	Ford Mustang RTR Spec 5 FD	N Nitto	
Jeff Jones	Jeff Jones Racing	818	12	350	United States	Nissan 370Z	K Kumho	
Jhonnattan Castro	Papadakis Racing	17	19	280	Dominican Republic	Toyota GR86	K Kenda	
Joao Barion	Five Bar Motorsports	357	37	98	Brazil	Chevrolet Corvette C7	K Kenda	
Jonathan Hurst	Cash Racing	16	15	322	United States	Cadillac XLR	K Kenda	
Kazuya Taguchi	Jerry Yang Racing	123	18	294	Japan	Toyota GT86	G GT Radial	
Ken Gushi	Three's Racing	21	14	336	Japan	Toyota GR86	K Kenda	
Kyle Mohan	Kyle Mohan Racing	99	30	182	United States	Mazda RX-8	V Vitour	
Matt Field	Drift Cave	777	7	392	United States	Chevrolet Corvette C6	G GT Radial	
Mike Power	Power Racing	919	36	112	United States	Nissan Silvia S15	N Nexen	
Nick Noback	Noback Racing	54	21	280	United States	BMW E46	K Kenda	
Rome Charpentier	Garagistic Racing	171	17	308	United States	BMW E82	V Vitour	
Robert Thorne	ASM	8	26	210	United States	BMW E46	G GT Radial	
Ryan Litteral	Ryan Litteral Racing	909	27	196	United States	Nissan Silvia S15	K Kenda	
Ryan Tuerck	Papadakis Racing	411	6	394	United States	Toyota GR Corolla	N Nitto	
Simen Olsen	Feal Suspension Race Team	707	11	364	Norway	Nissan Silvia S14	G GT Radial	
Taylor Hull	Outlaw Garage	82	20	280	United States	Chevrolet Corvette C6	K Kenda	
Trenton Beechum	Beechum Racing	999	16	322	United States	BMW E46	N Nexen	
Vaughn Gittin Jr.	RTR Motorsports	25	38	56	United States	Ford Mustang RTR Spec 5 FD	N Nitto	
Hiroya Minowa	Jerry Yang Racing	168	4	448	Japan	Toyota GT86	G GT Radial	RY
Conor Shanahan	Shanahan 79 / Garagistic Racing	79	8	380	(Republic of Ireland) Ireland	BMW E36	V Vitour	
Dan Burkett	RAD Industries	34	22	266	United States	Toyota Supra MKIV	G GT Radial	
Federico Sceriffo	DRIFTING DEPARTMENT 17	117	28	182	Italy	Ferrari 599 GTB	N Nexen	
Andy Hateley	Hateley Motorsports	98	29	182	United States	BMW E46	K Kumho	R
Dmitry Brutskiy	Team Never Settle	85	31	168	United States (Belarus)	BMW E46	V Vitour	R
Derek Madison	Team Infamous	27	32	168	United States	Nissan S14	K Kenda	R
Rudy Hansen	Team Hansen Drifting	119	33	154	United States	Nissan S13	G GT Radial	R
Ben Hobson	RTR Motorsports	213	34	126	United States	Ford Mustang RTR Spec 5 FD	N Nitto	R

== Tires – FD USA ==
A total of 17 tire manufacturers have sponsored drivers over the history of Formula DRIFT (USA) competition.

Tire brand	Tire icon	Years active
(Indonesia) Achilles	ACL	(?) – 2020
(France) BFGoodrich	BF	(?)
(Japan) Bridgestone	B	(?)
(United States) Cooper	C	(?)
(Japan) Dunlop	D	(?)
(Japan) Falken	F	(?) – 2022
(Taiwan) Federal	F	2020–2022
(Singapore) GT Radial	G	2020 – Present (2024)
(South Korea) Hankook	H	(?)
(Taiwan) Kenda	K	(?)-(?), 2023 – Present (2024)
(South Korea) Kumho	K	2024 – (?)
(Taiwan) Maxxis	M	(?)
(South Korea) Nexen	N	(?) – Present (2024)
(Japan) Nitto	N	(?) – Present (2024)
(Japan) Toyo	T	(?)
(China) Vitour	V	2023–Present (2024)
(Japan) Yokohama	Y	(?)

== Formula Drift television coverage ==
Former football player and reality show contestant Rossi Morreale hosted the Formula D show on the G4 television network in 2005. The following year, the series was primarily hosted by Brandon Johnson, the former host of Fox Soccer United States. Johnson was joined by Attack of the Show co-host Olivia Munn, who provided coverage of the pits and drivers during racing events, and drifting expert Adam Matthews, who provided commentary and insight on tandem battles. G4 aired each round of the championship on a tape-delayed basis. Jarod DeAnda, also known as "The Voice of Formula D," has been the long-standing public address announcer at each event. G4 initially broadcast DeAnda's announcements as event commentary in 2005. In 2006, Johnson and Matthews provided a combination of play-by-play and color commentary. Johnson and Matthews were on-site for each event, but provided commentary in the style of a post-event recap - a common post-production practice in the motorsports business.

During the 2004 season, a two-anchor tandem led by interviewer Mayleen Ramey conducted driver interviews in the pit. While Ramey was a roving reporter during the broadcast, her co-anchor would cover the accompanying car show at each event. In 2005, G4 shifted to a three-reporter team. During the events in Wall and Houston, actor Emeka Nnadi served as the pit interviewer. During the Infineon-sponsored round, Attack of the Show! co-host Kevin Pereira took over the role, while Street Fury host Carlton Lewis conducted the interviews in Chicago and Irwindale.

During this time, G4 broadcast half-hour episodes between rounds. Most episodes covered the network's attempts to build a drift car from scratch, while other segments focusing on the technical aspects of drifting. One of the first episodes in 2005 portrayed Formula D competitor Chris Forsberg's journey to Japan, where he met another competitor, Daijiro Yoshihara, explored the country, and covered the origins of drifting. Episodes featuring event coverage typically lasted an hour and a half, and featured the top 16 tandem rounds, as well as repeat rounds that would be held if the judges deemed the finish too close to call. These episodes would be broadcast the night after the next round in the series.

In 2006, the network made a series of changes to its event coverage. The length of each episode was reduced to an hour, and episodes were frequently broadcast out of order. The Long Beach and Atlanta rounds premiered on June 18, while an earlier round in Chicago aired on July 2. During the Sonoma round, which was broadcast one week after it took place, G4 noted that the Seattle round would premiere on September 10; the broadcast date was subsequently changed to October 8, and the last two rounds (Wall and Irwindale) were aired every other week afterwards. These episodes featured more interviews and driver profiles, and reduced coverage of the tandem battles. The changes were criticized by those in the drifting community, including fans and some Formula D drivers.

At the 2006 SEMA Show in Las Vegas, Formula D co-founders Jim Liaw and Ryan Sage announced that the series would have a new television partner in 2007. That partner was later revealed to be ESPN2. Each round began airing in a one-hour block on November 15, starting with the round in Long Beach. Subsequent airings were scheduled for every Thursday afterwards; however, beginning with the Evergreen Speedway round on December 5, the broadcast dates for new rounds was switched to Wednesday.

The ESPN deal lasted just one season. In 2008, all rounds of the Formula D season were aired on Speed TV, as well as the newly-created World Championship event held after the Irwindale round. Each event aired on Sunday at 4:00 p.m. ET, beginning with the Long Beach round on October 26.

In 2010, Formula Drift announced a comprehensive programming schedule with a new broadcast partner, the Versus sports network, which was co-owned with Comcast by G4. The seven-stop Formula DRIFT Championship Series aired over fourteen Sundays during the 2:00 p.m. ET time slot, beginning on August 30. The first episode featured a comprehensive overview of the sport and each participating driver. Each episode was re-broadcast the week after its initial airing.

== See also ==
- British Drift Championship
- D1 Grand Prix
- Drift Allstars
- Drift Masters
