= Samuel Hübinette =

Swedish racing driver

Samuel Hübinette, a.k.a. The Crazy Swede (born 15 September 1971, in Jokkmokk, Norrbotten County), is a Swedish professional race car driver and Hollywood stunt driver. He started working as a test driver for Volvo Cars. Today, he is one of the top names in drifting, having won the inaugural Formula D series championship in 2004 and 2006.

== Complete drifting results ==
Colour	Result
Gold	Winner
Silver	2nd place
Bronze	3rd place
Green	Last 4 [Semi-final]
Blue	Last 8 [Quarter-final]
Purple	Last 16 (16) [1st Tsuiou Round OR Tandem Battle] (Numbers are given to indicate Top 10 finish)
Black	Disqualified (DSQ) (Given to indicate that the driver has been stripped of their position through disqualification)
White	First Round (TAN) [Tansou OR Qualifying Single Runs]
Red	Did not qualify (DNQ)

- When driver's position are highlighted in blue, this indicates either the driver earned 100pt or 100pt tansou (solo run) bonus has been awarded, with the latter being in use for Pre-2005.

=== D1 Grand Prix ===
Year	Entrant	Car	1	2	3	4	5	6	7	8	Position	Points
2004		Toyota Supra JZA80	IRW; 10	SGO	EBS	APS	ODB	EBS	TKB		26	2
2006	Mopar	Dodge Viper SRT/10	IRW; 4	SGO	FUJ	APS	EBS	SUZ	FUJ		19	14
2006	Mopar	Dodge Charger SRT-8								IRW; TSU	19	14

=== Formula D ===
Year	Entrant	Car	1	2	3	4	5	6	7	Position	Points
2004	Mopar	Dodge Viper Competition Coupe	Rd. 1	Rd. 2	Rd. 3	Rd. 4				1	
2005	Mopar	Dodge Viper SRT/10	Rd. 1	Rd. 2	Rd. 3	Rd. 4	Rd. 5	Rd. 6			
2006	Mopar	Dodge Viper SRT/10	Rd. 1	Rd. 2	Rd. 3	Rd. 4	Rd. 5	Rd. 6	Rd. 7	1	
2006	Mopar	Dodge Charger SRT-8								1	
2007	Mopar	Dodge Charger SRT-8	Rd. 1	Rd. 2	Rd. 3	Rd. 4	Rd. 5	Rd. 6	Rd. 7		

== Racing record ==
=== Complete Global RallyCross Championship results ===
==== Supercar ====
Year	Entrant	Car	1	2	3	4	5	6	GRC	Points
2012	Scott-Eklund Racing	Saab 9-3	CHA; 5	TEX; 7	LA; 9	NH; 2	LVS; 12	LVC; 4	3rd	63

Preceded by None	Formula D Champion; 2004	Succeeded by Rhys Millen
Preceded by Rhys Millen	Formula D Champion; 2006	Succeeded by Tanner Foust
