= Darren McNamara =

- Nationality: Ireland
- Born: 10 September 1982 (age 44) Cork, Ireland

Formula D career
- Current team: Team Falken Tire

Darren 'D-Mac' McNamara (born 10 September 1982) is a professional drift driver from Cork, Ireland.

McNamara first competed in the Irish Prodrift Championship series and the British D1 Great Britain series (now EDC), winning the Prodrift title in 2006. He drove a Toyota AE86 with a Nissan SR20 engine.

In 2007, McNamara was invited to compete in the American Formula D series. He achieved his maiden win at Wall Speedway and a second place at Road Atlanta.

In the 2012 Formula D Season, McNamara started at Long Beach in the Falken Tire Saturn Sky. After a crash in his top 32 battle with Kenneth Moen, the Sky was damaged and not usable for future competition. For Round 2 and 3, he drove the Falken Tire 350Z, formerly driven by Tyler McQuarrie. For Round 4 and 5, he competed in the Falken Tire Nissan Silvia S15 with a V8.

For the 2013 season, McNamara drove a newly built V8 powered Nissan S14.

McNamara also competed in European events in a Rotary powered Toyota AE86, including in Prodrift and British Drift Championship events.

== In popular culture ==
McNamara appears in the 2011 video game, Shift 2: Unleashed as the main rival in the Retro branch with the Team Need for Speed Toyota AE86.
