= Robbie Nishida =

Japanese-born American drifter

- Born: December 26, 1977 (age 48); Okinawa, Japan
- Occupations: Professional Drift Car Driver; Manager of Car Care Center, Tokyo, Japan
- Known for: Drifting; Formula D Competitor
- Height: 5 ft 11 in (180 cm)

Notes
- All stats current as of October 17, 2012.

Robbie Nishida (born December 26, 1977) is a professional drifter who currently competes in several different professional series' around the world, including Formula D USA series and Formula D World series. He has been competing in the Formula D USA series since 2005. He has been competing ever since both in Japan and the USA.

== Quick Facts ==
=== Bio ===
- Nickname - Bushido
- Height – 5’ 11”
- Weight – 160 lbs
- Car Number – 31
- Hometown – Okinawa, Japan
- Team – Achilles Radial (Formula DRIFT) USA

      - Achilles Radial Formula D Asia

- Crew Members – Mike Warfield, Erick Gomez, and Joe Tardiff (Formula D) USA

=== Current Sponsors ===
- Achilles Radial
- Oracle Lighting
- Motovicity Distribution
- BC Racing Suspension
- Garrett Turbos
- SPEC Clutch
- Deatschwerks
- Voodoo13 USA
- MazWorx Engines
- Takata
- Turbo Smart
- Goodridge
- Illest / Fatlace
- Brian Crower
- Seibon
- AME Wheels
- JE Pistons
- Nitrous Express
- OS Giken
- TOP 1 Oil

== Career ==
Nishida was born in Okinawa to Japanese mother Hiroko Nishida and James Kiester, a US Air Force retired senior master sergeant. At age 5, he moved to the Yokota area and has been there ever since. He was first exposed to drifting on the mountains of Japan around the age of 20. He has been drifting professionally since 1998. In his first FD event at Wall Speedway in 2005, he placed fourth in Nobushige Kumakubo's orange Silvia-truck running on sponsored Falken Tires, by beating Samuel Hubinette, the then reigning 2004 FD Champion, in a tandem battle. His wife, Christine Nishida, is a civilian working for the US military as secretary for Marine Corps Brig. Gen. John Toolan. They have a 13-year-old son.

== Cars Driven ==
=== 1993 Bridges Racing, Achilles Radial Lexus SC300 ===
- Tires – Achilles Radial
- Engine – stroked 3.4L 2JZ, custom Portland Speed Industries (PSI) turbo manifold, Garrett GTX4294R Turbo, TurboSmart Waste Gates, BC internals, & AEM EMS
- Horsepower – 818 whp 738 ft-lbs of torque
- Suspension – BC Racing Suspension
- Brakes – Factory fronts and Wilwood Rears
- Wheels – Volks Racing Gram Lights 57D
- Exterior – Vertex Body Kit
- Interior – Sparco seat, steering wheel, and harness.
- Series - Formula D USA 2012

=== Bridges Racing Nissan 240SX ===
- Engine – Supercharged 4.0L VQ
- Series - Formula D USA 2011

=== 2009 Hankook Nissan GT-R (RWD) ===
- Tires – Hankook RS-3 tires
- Engine – Turbocharged VQ35 stroker Kit
- Transmission - G-Force 4-Speed Dog Box Transmission
- Suspension – KW Coil Over kit
- Wheels – MONO Forged wheels by Savini
- Series - Formula D USA 2010 (minus round 1)

=== Hankook Tire/Gruppe S Nissan 350Z ===
- Engine - Turbocharged VQ
- Series - Formula D USA 2009

=== Falken Tire Nissan S14 240SX ===
- Series - Formula D USA 2007, D1GP USA 2007

== Achievements ==
=== Formula Drift USA 2012 Finished 13th Overall (320.75 pts) ===
- Won Most Improved Driver Award
- Placed Top 32 at Formula Drift Round 1, Streets of Long Beach, CA (Qualified 25th)
- Placed Top 32 at Formula Drift Round 2, Road Atlanta Raceway, GA (Qualified 30th)
- Placed Top 16 at Formula Drift Round 3, Palm Beach International Raceway, FL (Qualified 30th)
- Placed Top 16 at Formula Drift Round 4, The Wall, NJ (Qualified 15th)
- Placed Top 32 at Formula Drift Round 5, Evergreen Speedway, WA (Qualified 18th)
- Placed 4th at Formula Drift Round 6, Las Vegas Motor Speedway, NV (Qualified 3rd)
- Placed Top 8 at Formula Drift Round 7, Irwindale Speedway, CA (Qualified 19th)

=== Formula Drift Asia 2012 ===
- Won Best Drift Style Award
- Placed 4th at Formula Drift Asia Singapore (Qualified 4th)
- Placed 4th at Formula Drift Asia Indonesia (Qualified 3rd)

=== Formula Drift USA 2011 Finished 34th Overall (120.25 pts) ===
- Placed Top 32 at Formula Drift Round 5, Evergreen Speedway, WA (Qualified 28th)
- Placed Top 32 at Formula Drift Round 6, Las Vegas Motor Speedway, NV (Qualified 3rd)
- Placed Top 8 at Formula Drift Round 7, Irwindale Speedway, CA (Qualified 8th)

=== Formula Drift Asia 2011 ===
- Placed Top 16 at Formula Drift Asia Singapore
- Placed Top 16 at Formula Drift Asia Indonesia
- Placed Top 32 at Formula Drift Asia Malaysia

=== Formula Drift USA 2010 Finished 31st Overall (129.25 pts) ===
- Placed Top 16 at Formula Drift Round 2, Road Atlanta Raceway, GA (Qualified 11th)
- Placed Top 32 at Formula Drift Round 3
- Placed Top 32 at Formula Drift Round 4, The Wall, NJ (Qualified 28th)
- Placed Top 32 at Formula Drift Round 5, Evergreen Speedway, WA (Qualified 21st)
- Placed Top 32 at Formula Drift Round 7, Irwindale Speedway, CA (Qualified 17th)

=== Formula Drift USA 2009 Finished 8th Overall (425.25 pts) ===
- Placed 4th at Formula Drift Round 1, Streets of Long Beach, CA (Qualified 8th)
- Placed Top 8 at Formula Drift Round 2, Road Atlanta Raceway, GA (Qualified 11th)
- Placed Top 8 at Formula Drift Round 3
- Placed Top 16 at Formula Drift Round 4, The Wall, NJ (Qualified 14th)
- Placed Top 16 at Formula Drift Round 5, Evergreen Speedway, WA (Qualified 16th)
- Placed Top 16 at Formula Drift Round 6, Las Vegas Motor Speedway, NV (Qualified 1st)
- Placed Top 8 at Formula Drift Round 7, Irwindale Speedway, CA (Qualified 10th)

=== Formula Drift USA 2008 Finished 10th Overall (318.25 pts) ===
- Placed Top 32 at Formula Drift Round 1
- Placed Top 16 at Formula Drift Round 2
- Placed Top 8 at Formula Drift Round 4
- Placed 3rd at Formula Drift Round 5
- Placed Top 16 at Formula Drift Round 6
- Placed Top 8 at Formula Drift Round 7

=== Formula Drift USA 2007 Finished 16th Overall (222.25 pts) ===
- Placed Top 16 at Formula Drift Round 1
- Placed Top 32 at Formula Drift Round 2
- Placed Top 16 at Formula Drift Round 4
- Placed Top 16 at Formula Drift Round 6
- Placed Top 16 at Formula Drift Round 7
