= Multistrada Arah Sarana =

Indonesian tire manufacturing company

PT Multistrada Arah Sarana
- Formerly: Oroban Perkasa (1988–1996)
- Company type: Subsidiary
- Traded as: IDX: MASA (2005–2025)
- Industry: Auto and industrial tires
- Founded: 28 May 1988; 38 years ago
- Headquarters: Jakarta, Indonesia
- Key people: Tan Su Hui (president Commissioner); Igor Zyemit (president Director)
- Products: Tires
- Revenue: ▲USD 229.8 million (2016)
- Net income: ▲USD - 7.7 million (2016)
- Total assets: ▲USD 609.745 million (2016)
- Total equity: ▲USD 338.968 million (2016)
- Number of employees: 3,225 (2016)
- Parent: Michelin
- Website: www.multistrada.co.id

PT Multistrada Arah Sarana is an Indonesian tire manufacturer. They sell tires under the brands Achilles and Corsa. It is considered to be one of the largest tire manufacturers in Indonesia, operating factories of 55 hectares (140 acres) and 128 hectares (320 acres), located in East Cikarang, Indonesia. Since 2019, it is a subsidiary of French manufacturer Michelin.

== Products ==
MASA manufactures tires for passengers cars, commercial cars, trucks, buses, and competition vehicles, as well as performance and industrial tires which are used in the international market. Multistrada Arah Sarana also manufactures tires under the brand name Achilles and Corsa, as well as Michelin, BFGoodrich and Uniroyal.

== History ==
PT Multistrada Arah Sarana Tbk or MASA, was known as PT Oroban Perkasa when it first started in 1988. They had built motorcycle tires and cars, with their own brands, which are Strada, Achilles, and Corsa. MASA received assistance from Pirelli (Italy) and Continental (Germany) to improve their manufacturing technology. During the 1997 Asian financial crisis, the company was given to Badan Penyehatan Perbankan Nasional (BPPN) to save the company. In 2004, the company then was taken under the guidance of PT Indokemika Jayatama. They made the company available for IPO in 2005. Through equity and syndicated loans, the company has been able to expand their capital and increase productivity and quality.

Since then, Achilles Radial has expanded its product line into the industrial market. They started to build tires for trucks and buses with their Solid Tire or known as ST and TBR for their bus tires. The company also improved its internal quality by taking a more aggressive stance towards consumer safety. They gained their certificates for the ISP/TS 16949:2009 and ISO/IEC 17025:2008 for Quality Management System and a couple of other product certificates such as SNI, CCC, Inmetro, BIS, ECE-30, ECE-54, GSO, DOT, FMVSS 139.

On 22 January 2019, it was announced that MASA was acquired by French-based manufacturer Michelin. On 19 June that year, Michelin owns 99.64% of the share capital of Multistrada.
