= Ryan Tuerck =

American racing driver

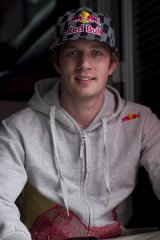
- Tuerck in 2010
- Nationality: United States
- Born: Ryan Charles Tuerck; 10 April 1985 (age 41) Derry, New Hampshire, U.S.

Formula D career
- Debut season: 2005
- Current team: Papadakis Racing
- Car number: 411
- Wins: 7
- Best finish: 2nd in 2009

Ryan Charles Tuerck (born April 10, 1985) is an American professional drifter who has competed in the Formula Drift series since 2005. He has a popular YouTube series called Tuerck'd. A native of Derry, New Hampshire, as of 2021 he was living in Los Angeles.

== Formula Drift Biography ==
Tuerck is a social media personality and driver of the RainX Toyota Corolla Hatchback, a part of the Papadakis Racing organization.

Notable projects include the YouTube series Tuerck’d, Network A’s Drift Garage, and the Gumout Blackout series. A build series on a Ferrari engine-swapped Toyota 86 known as the Toyota GT4586 has generated nearly 70 million impressions since its 2016 launch.

Tuerck started his motorsport career on two wheels, racing in the AMA motocross series in his early teens.

In addition to campaigning a full Formula Drift season, Tuerck maintains a full demo and appearance calendar. A New Hampshire native, Tuerck now lives in Los Angeles.

== History ==
At the age of nine, Tuerck's father bought him his first dirt bike, and by ten years old he started racing motocross, where he saw minor success. At the age of 16, he received his professional license from the American Motocross Association (AMA), and by 17, Ryan earned the opportunity to travel to Canada, to race in the Canadian Nationals. Include a fifth place finish in the 125cc Canadian Nationals Championship, as well as qualifying for Budds Creek, and Unadilla in the AMA Motocross Nationals.

In 2003, Tuerck competed at his first formal event at Raceway Park in Englishtown, NJ, where he met future “Drift Alliance” teammates Tony Angelo, Chris Forsberg, and Vaughn Gittin Jr. Ryan placed first in his first formal competition.

Before joining Formula D, he completed in Drift Mania Canadian Championship. In 2005, Tuerck Competed in Two Rounds of Formula Drift, getting noticed by a few sponsors. In 2006, Tuerck completed a full Formula Drift season. In 2007, Tuerck finished 15th in the Formula Drift championship. In 2008, Tuerck was picked up by Gardella Racing and drove a 2007 Pontiac Solstice GXP sponsored by Gardella Racing, Mobil 1, GM Racing, and Maxxis Tires. Following in 2009, Tuerck finished 3rd in the Formula Drift championship, winning twice at Long Beach and Irwindale. In 2011, Tuerck drove the 2011 Mobil 1/Red Bull Chevrolet Camaro, finishing 15th in the championship. In 2012, He finished the season in fifth after a third-place finish at Irwindale.

Tuerck also takes part in a missile drifting group based out of Englishtown, NJ called "Blood Masters".

For the 2022 Formula Drift Season, Tuerck drove a Toyota GR Corolla built by Papadakis Racing. He is sponsored by Rain-X, Nitto Tire, and Toyota Racing.

== Notable Cars and Projects ==
=== Formula Drift Pro Car ===
Tuerck's current Pro Car is a Toyota GR Corolla built by Papadakis Racing. The title sponsors are, Rain-X and Nitto Tire.

=== GT4586 ===
Tuerck's previous SEMA build, is a Ferrari-powered Toyota 86 and frequently appears in demos, including the Goodwood Festival of Speed.

=== Papadakis Demo Car ===
Tuerck also drives the Papadakis Racing Toyota Corolla Hatchback Demo Car that was most recently at the Gridlife Alpine Horizon Festival.

=== East Coast Car ===
Tuerck is also working on an "East Coast" Toyota 86, that was originally the "$25k Baja 86". Both builds have a series posted on YouTube.

=== Formula Supra ===
The "Formula Supra" is an in-development car based on the 2020 Toyota GR Supra powered by a V10 Judd engine. The car is designed with a focus on hill climb and time attack.

== Formula Drift Results ==
=== 2023 ===
- Formula D Championship - 7th Overall (392 pts)
- Round 1: Streets Of Long Beach (Long Beach) Top 8
- Round 2: Road to the Championship (Atlanta) Top 32
- Round 3: Scorched (Orlando) Top 8
- Round 4: The Gauntlet (Englishtown) Top 8
- Round 5: Crossroads (St. Louis) Top 16
- Round 6: Throwdown (Monroe) Final 4
- Round 7: Elevated (Grantsville) Final 4
- Round 8: Title Fight (Irwindale) Final 4

=== 2022 ===
- Formula D Championship - 3rd Overall (573 pts)
- Round 1: Streets Of Long Beach (Long Beach) Finished 1st
- Round 2: Road to the Championship (Atlanta) Top 8
- Round 3: Scorched (Orlando) Top 16
- Round 4: The Gauntlet (Englishtown) Top 8
- Round 5: Crossroads (St. Louis) Finished 2nd
- Round 6: Throwdown (Monroe) Top 8
- Round 7: Elevated (Grantsville) Top 32
- Round 8: Title Fight (Irwindale) Finished 2nd

=== 2021 ===
- Formula D Championship - 6th Overall (537 pts)
- Round 1: Road to the Championship (Atlanta) Top 16
- Round 2: Scorched (Orlando) Top 32
- Round 3: The Gauntlet (Englishtown) Finished 4th
- Round 4: Borderlands (Erie) Top 16
- Round 5: Throwdown (Monroe) Finished 2nd
- Round 6: Crossroads (St. Louis) Finished 2nd
- Round 7: Streets Of Long Beach (Long Beach) Top 16
- Round 8: Title Fight (Irwindale) Top 8

=== 2020 ===
- Formula D Championship - 3rd Overall (484 pts)
- Round 1: Crossroads (St. Louis) Finished 2nd
- Round 2: Crossroads (St. Louis) Finished 3rd
- Round 3: Throwdown (Monroe) Top 16
- Round 4: Throwdown (Monroe) Finished 3rd
- Round 5: Showdown (Texas) Finished 1st
- Round 6: Showdown (Texas) Top 8
- Round 7: Title Fight (Irwindale) Top 16
- Round 8: Title Fight (Irwindale) Top 16

=== 2019 ===
- Formula D Championship - 5th Overall (443 pts)
- Round 1: Streets of Long Beach (Long Beach) Top 32 (Qualified 7th)
- Round 2: Scorched (Orlando) Top 16 (Qualified 15th)
- Round 3: Road to the Championship (Atlanta) Finished 2nd (Qualified 3rd)
- Round 4: The Gauntlet (New Jersey) Finished 1st (Qualified 9th)
- Round 5: Throwdown (Monroe) Top 16 (Qualified 3rd)
- Round 6: Crossroads (St. Louis) Final 4 (Qualified 6th)
- Round 7: Showdown (Texas) Top 8 (Qualified 29th)
- Round 8: Title Fight (Irwindale) Top 8 (Qualified 3rd)

=== 2018 ===
- Formula D Championship - 6th Overall (380 pts)
- Round 1: Streets of Long Beach (Long Beach) Top 8 (Qualified 8th)
- Round 2: Scorched (Orlando) Final 4 (Qualified 6th)
- Round 3: Road to the Championship (Atlanta) Top 16 (Qualified 20th)
- Round 4: The Gauntlet (New Jersey) Top 16 (Qualified 12th)
- Round 5: Throwdown (Monroe) Finished 2nd (Qualified 7th)
- Round 6: Crossroads (St. Louis) Top 32 (Qualified 12th)
- Round 7: Showdown (Texas) Top 8 (Qualified 5th)
- Round 8: Title Fight (Irwindale) Top 16 (Qualified 5th)

=== 2017 ===
- Formula D Championship - 9th Overall (340 pts)

=== 2016 ===
- Formula D Championship - 9th Overall (322 pts)

=== 2015 ===
- Formula D Championship - 4th Overall (367 pts)

=== 2014 ===
- Formula D Championship - 12th Overall (235 pts)

=== 2013 ===
- Formula D Championship - 14th Overall (291 pts)

=== 2012 ===
- Formula D Championship - 5th Overall (465.50 pts)
- Formula D ~ Best Style Award
- Placed Top 16 at Formula Drift Round 1, Streets of Long Beach, CA (Qualified 1st)
- Placed Top 16 at Formula Drift Round 2, Road Atlanta Raceway, GA (Qualified 24th)
- Placed Top 8 at Formula Drift Round 3, Palm Beach International Raceway, FL (Qualified 11th)
- Placed Top 16 at Formula Drift Round 4, The Wall, NJ (Qualified 11th)
- Placed 2nd at Formula Drift Round 5, Evergreen Speedway, WA (Qualified 15th)
- Placed Top 16 at Formula Drift Round 6, Las Vegas Motor Speedway, NV (Qualified 14th)
- Placed 3rd at Formula Drift Round 7, Irwindale Speedway, CA (Qualified 6th)

=== 2011 ===
- Formula D Championship - 7th Overall (437 pts)
- Placed Top 8 at Formula Drift Round 1, Streets of Long Beach, CA (Qualified 10th)
- Placed Top 16 at Formula Drift Round 2, Road Atlanta Raceway, GA (Qualified 2nd)
- Placed Top 16 at Formula Drift Round 3, Palm Beach International Raceway, FL (Qualified 14th)
- Placed 4th at Formula Drift Round 4, The Wall, NJ (Qualified 1st)
- Placed Top 8 at Formula Drift Round 5, Evergreen Speedway, WA (Qualified 10th)
- Placed Top 8 at Formula Drift Round 6, Las Vegas Motor Speedway, NV (Qualified 13th)
- Placed Top 8 at Formula Drift Round 7, Irwindale Speedway, CA (Qualified 4th)

=== 2010 ===
- Formula D Championship - 3rd Overall (515 pts)
- Placed Top 16 at Formula Drift Round 1, Streets of Long Beach, CA (Qualified 6th)
- Placed Top 8 at Formula Drift Round 2, Road Atlanta Raceway, GA (Qualified 2nd)
- Placed Top 8 at Formula Drift Round 3
- Placed Top 8 at Formula Drift Round 4, The Wall, NJ (Qualified 1st)
- Placed 2nd at Formula Drift Round 5, Evergreen Speedway, WA (Qualified 3rd)
- Placed Top 16 at Formula Drift Round 6, Las Vegas Motor Speedway, NV (Qualified 12th)
- Placed Top 16 at Formula Drift Round 7, Irwindale Speedway, CA (Qualified 4th)

=== 2009 ===
- Formula D Championship - 2nd Overall (521 pts)
- Placed 1st at Formula Drift Round 1, Streets of Long Beach, CA (Qualified 10th)
- Placed 3rd at Formula Drift Round 2, Road Atlanta Raceway, GA (Qualified 9th)
- Placed Top 32 at Formula Drift Round 4, The Wall, NJ (Qualified 11th)
- Placed Top 8 at Formula Drift Round 5, Evergreen Speedway, WA (Qualified 1st)
- Placed Top 16 at Formula Drift Round 6, Las Vegas Motor Speedway, NV (Qualified 15th)
- Placed 1st at Formula Drift Round 7, Irwindale Speedway, CA (Qualified 2nd)

=== 2008 ===
- Formula D Championship - 6th Overall (453 pts)
- Placed Top 8 at Formula Drift Round 1, Streets of Long Beach, CA
- Placed 3rd at Formula Drift Round 2, Road Atlanta Raceway, GA
- Placed Top 16 at Formula Drift Round 4, The Wall, NJ
- Placed Top 8 at Formula Drift Round 5, Evergreen Speedway, WA
- Placed 4th at Formula Drift Round 6, Las Vegas Motor Speedway, NV
- Placed Top 8 at Formula Drift Round 7, Irwindale Speedway, CA

=== 2007 ===
- Formula D Championship - 15th Overall (228.50 pts)
- Placed Top 16 at Formula Drift Round 1, Streets of Long Beach, CA
- Placed Top 16 Formula Drift Round 2, Road Atlanta Raceway, GA
- Placed Top 16 at Formula Drift Round 3
- Placed Top 16 at Formula Drift Round 7, Irwindale Speedway, CA
