= 2025 Fuji GT 3 Hours =

Layout of Fuji Speedway, where the race was held

The 2025 Fuji GT 3 Hours was the second round of the 2025 Super GT Series. It was held at the Fuji Speedway in Oyama, Shizuoka Prefecture, Japan on May 4, 2025.

The GT500 category was won by Hiroaki Ishiura and Toshiki Oyu in the #38 TGR Team KeePer Cerumo Toyota GR Supra, whilst Yoshiaki Katayama and Roberto Merhi Muntan won the GT300 category in the #6 Velorex Ferrari 296 GT3.

== Race ==
=== Race results ===
Pos	Class	No	Entrant	Drivers	Chassis	Tyre	Laps	Time/Retired
1	GT500	38	TGR Team KeePer Cerumo	(Japan) Hiroaki Ishiura (Japan) Toshiki Oyu	Toyota GR Supra GT500	B	116	3:01:22.811
2	GT500	1	TGR Team au TOM'S	(Japan) Sho Tsuboi (Japan) Kenta Yamashita	Toyota GR Supra GT500	B	116	+11.969
3	GT500	100	Stanley Team Kunimitsu	(Japan) Tadasuke Makino (Japan) Naoki Yamamoto	Honda Civic Type R-GT	B	116	+24.178
4	GT500	12	Team Impul	(Belgium) Bertrand Baguette (Japan) Kazuki Hiramine	Nissan Z NISMO GT500	B	116	+25.289
5	GT500	39	TGR Team SARD	(Japan) Yuhi Sekiguchi (Argentina) Sacha Fenestraz	Toyota GR Supra GT500	B	116	+29.628
6	GT500	14	TGR Team ENEOS ROOKIE	(Japan) Kazuya Oshima (Japan) Nirei Fukuzumi	Toyota GR Supra GT500	B	116	+31.508
7	GT500	37	TGR Team Deloitte TOM'S	(France) Giuliano Alesi (Japan) Ukyo Sasahara	Toyota GR Supra GT500	B	116	+34.866
8	GT500	23	NISMO	(Japan) Katsumasa Chiyo (Japan) Mitsunori Takaboshi	Nissan Z NISMO GT500	B	116	+42.179
9	GT500	8	ARTA	(Japan) Nobuharu Matsushita (Japan) Tomoki Nojiri	Honda Civic Type R-GT	B	116	+47.641
10	GT500	3	NISMO NDDP	(Japan) Atsushi Miyake (Japan) Daiki Sasaki	Nissan Z NISMO GT500	B	116	+1:04.058
11	GT500	16	ARTA	(Japan) Hiroki Otsu (Japan) Ren Sato	Honda Civic Type R-GT	B	116	+1:38.013
12	GT500	17	Astemo Real Racing	(Japan) Syun Koide (Japan) Koudai Tsukakoshi	Honda Civic Type R-GT	B	115	+1 Lap
13	GT500	64	Modulo Nakajima Racing	(Japan) Takuya Izawa (Japan) Riki Okusa	Honda Civic Type R-GT	D	115	+1 Lap
14	GT500	19	TGR Team WedsSport Bandoh	(Japan) Yuji Kunimoto (Japan) Sena Sakaguchi (Japan) Kazuto Kotaka	Toyota GR Supra GT500	Y	115	+1 Lap
15	GT500	24	Kondo Racing	(Japan) Tsugio Matsuda (Japan) Teppei Natori	Nissan Z NISMO GT500	Y	114	+2 Laps
16	GT300	6	Velorex	(Japan) Yoshiaki Katayama (Spain) Roberto Merhi	Ferrari 296 GT3	Y	107	+9 laps
17	GT300	777	D'station Racing	(Japan) Tomonobu Fujii (United Kingdom) Charlie Fagg	Aston Martin Vantage AMR GT3 Evo	D	107	+9 laps
18	GT300	2	Hyper Water Racing Inging	(Japan) Yuui Tsutsumi (Japan) Hibiki Taira (Japan) Kazuhisa Urabe	Toyota GR86 GT300	B	107	+9 laps
19	GT300	7	CarGuy MKS Racing	(United Kingdom) Zak O'Sullivan (Japan) Rikuto Kobayashi (Japan) Keita Sawa	Ferrari 296 GT3	Y	107	+9 laps
20	GT300	65	K2 R&D LEON Racing	(Japan) Naoya Gamou (Japan) Togo Suganami (Japan) Haruki Kurosawa	Mercedes-AMG GT3 Evo	B	107	+9 laps
21	GT300	45	Ponos Racing	(Japan) Kei Cozzolino (Japan) Takuro Shinohara	Ferrari 296 GT3	D	107	+9 laps
22	GT300	56	Kondo Racing	(Japan) Kohei Hirate (Japan) Yu Kanamaru	Nissan GT-R Nismo GT3	Y	107	+9 laps
23	GT300	61	R&D Sport	(Japan) Takuto Iguchi (Japan) Hideki Yamauchi	Subaru BRZ GT300 (ZD8)	D	106	+10 laps
24	GT300	4	Goodsmile Racing & TeamUkyo	(Japan) Nobuteru Taniguchi (Japan) Tatsuya Kataoka	Mercedes-AMG GT3 Evo	Y	106	+10 laps
25	GT300	5	Team Mach	(Japan) Yusuke Shiotsu (Japan) Iori Kimura	Toyota 86 MC GT300	Y	106	+10 laps
26	GT300	26	Anest Iwata Racing	(Brazil) Igor Fraga (Japan) Hironobu Yasuda	Lexus RC F GT3	Y	106	+10 laps
27	GT300	360	Tomei Sports	(Japan) Takayuki Aoki (Japan) Rin Arakawa (Japan) Hironobu Shimizu	Nissan GT-R Nismo GT3	Y	105	+11 laps
28	GT300	96	K-tunes Racing	(Japan) Morio Nitta (Japan) Shinichi Takagi	Lexus RC F GT3	D	105	+11 laps
29	GT300	11	GAINER	(Japan) Ryuichiro Tomita (Japan) Kazuki Oki	Nissan Fairlady Z GT300 (RZ34)	D	105	+11 laps
30	GT300	60	LM corsa	(Japan) Hiroki Yoshimoto (Japan) Shunsuke Kohno (Japan) Reimei Ito	Lexus LC 500 GT	D	105	+11 laps
31	GT300	30	apr	(Japan) Hiroaki Nagai (Japan) Manabu Orido (Japan) Ryo Ogawa	Toyota GR86 GT300	MI	104	+12 laps
32	GT300	20	SHADE Racing	(Japan) Katsuyuki Hiranaka (Japan) Eijiro Shimizu (Japan) Yuki Sano	Toyota GR86 GT300	MI	104	+12 laps
33	GT300	9	Pacific Racing Team	(Japan) Ryohei Sakaguchi (Japan) Yusuke Tomibayashi (Japan) Yuta Fujiwara	Mercedes-AMG GT3 Evo	Y	104	+12 laps
34	GT300	31	apr	(Japan) Miki Koyama (Japan) Yuki Nemoto (Denmark) Oliver Rasmussen	Lexus LC 500h GT	B	104	+12 laps
35	GT300	22	R'Qs Motor Sports	(Japan) Masaki Kano (Japan) Yuma Shoji (Japan) Masaki Jyonai	Mercedes-AMG GT3 Evo	Y	104	+12 laps
36	GT300	48	Nilzz Racing	(Japan) Taiyo Ida (Japan) Yusaku Shibata (Japan) Daiki Fujiwara	Nissan GT-R Nismo GT3	Y	104	+12 laps
37	GT300	25	Hoppy Team Tsuchiya	(Japan) Takamitsu Matsui (Japan) Kimiya Sato	Toyota GR Supra GT500	Y	104	+12 laps
38	GT300	18	Team UpGarage	(Japan) Takashi Kobayashi (Japan) Yuto Nomura	Mercedes-AMG GT3 Evo	Y	104	+12 laps
39	GT300	666	Seven x Seven Racing	(Japan) Kiyoto Fujinami (Japan) Tsubasa Kondo (United Kingdom) Harry King	Porsche 911 GT3 R (992)	Y	100	+16 laps
40	GT300	87	JLOC	(Japan) Kosuke Matsuura (Japan) Natsu Sakaguchi	Lamborghini Huracán GT3 Evo 2	Y	95	+21 Laps
41	GT300	52	Saitama Green Brave	(Japan) Hiroki Yoshida (Japan) Seita Nonaka	Toyota GR Supra GT300	B	92	+24 Laps
Ret	GT300	62	HELM Motorsports	(Japan) Yuya Hiraki (Japan) Reiji Hiraki	Nissan GT-R Nismo GT3	Y	18	Accident
Ret	GT300	0	JLOC	(Japan) Takashi Kogure (Japan) Yuya Motojima	Lamborghini Huracán GT3 Evo 2	Y	3	Suspension

Super GT Series
Previous race: 2025 Okayama GT 300km	2025 season	Next race: 2025 Super GT Malaysia Festival
