= 2025 Okayama GT 300km =

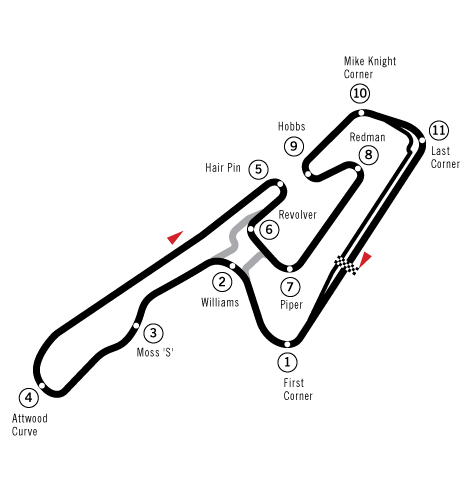
Layout of Okayama International Circuit, where the race was held

The 2025 Okayama GT 300km was the first round of the 2025 Super GT Series. It was held at the Okayama International Circuit in Mimasaka, Okayama Prefecture, Japan on April 13, 2025.

The GT500 category was won by Sho Tsuboi and Kenta Yamashita in the #1 TGR Team au TOM'S Toyota GR Supra, whilst Naoya Gamou and Togo Suganami won the GT300 category in the #65 K2 R&D LEON Racing Mercedes-AMG GT3 Evo.

== Race ==
=== Race results ===
Pos	Class	No	Entrant	Drivers	Chassis	Tyre	Laps	Time/Retired
1	GT500	1	TGR Team au TOM'S	(Japan) Sho Tsuboi (Japan) Kenta Yamashita	Toyota GR Supra GT500	B	82	2:55:17.063
2	GT500	14	TGR Team ENEOS ROOKIE	(Japan) Kazuya Oshima (Japan) Nirei Fukuzumi	Toyota GR Supra GT500	B	82	+2.859
3	GT500	39	TGR Team SARD	(Japan) Yuhi Sekiguchi (Argentina) Sacha Fenestraz	Toyota GR Supra GT500	B	82	+12.368
4	GT500	100	Stanley Team Kunimitsu	(Japan) Tadasuke Makino (Japan) Naoki Yamamoto	Honda Civic Type R-GT	B	82	+14.008
5	GT500	37	TGR Team Deloitte TOM'S	(France) Giuliano Alesi (Japan) Ukyo Sasahara	Toyota GR Supra GT500	B	82	+15.120
6	GT500	23	NISMO	(Japan) Katsumasa Chiyo (Japan) Mitsunori Takaboshi	Nissan Z NISMO GT500	B	82	+22.274
7	GT500	8	ARTA	(Japan) Nobuharu Matsushita (Japan) Tomoki Nojiri	Honda Civic Type R-GT	B	82	+53.444
8	GT500	17	Astemo Real Racing	(Japan) Syun Koide (Japan) Koudai Tsukakoshi	Honda Civic Type R-GT	B	81	+1 Lap
9	GT500	64	Modulo Nakajima Racing	(Japan) Takuya Izawa (Japan) Riki Okusa	Honda Civic Type R-GT	D	81	+1 Lap
10	GT500	3	NISMO NDDP	(Japan) Atsushi Miyake (Japan) Daiki Sasaki	Nissan Z NISMO GT500	B	80	+2 Laps
11	GT300	65	K2 R&D LEON Racing	(Japan) Naoya Gamou (Japan) Togo Suganami	Mercedes-AMG GT3 Evo	B	79	+3 laps
12	GT300	26	Anest Iwata Racing	(Brazil) Igor Fraga (Japan) Hironobu Yasuda	Lexus RC F GT3	Y	79	+3 laps
13	GT300	56	Kondo Racing	(Japan) Kohei Hirate (Brazil) João Paulo de Oliveira	Nissan GT-R Nismo GT3	Y	79	+3 laps
14	GT300	4	Goodsmile Racing & TeamUkyo	(Japan) Nobuteru Taniguchi (Japan) Tatsuya Kataoka	Mercedes-AMG GT3 Evo	Y	78	+4 laps
15	GT300	9	Pacific Racing Team	(Japan) Ryohei Sakaguchi (Japan) Yusuke Tomibayashi	Mercedes-AMG GT3 Evo	Y	78	+4 laps
16	GT300	96	K-tunes Racing	(Japan) Morio Nitta (Japan) Shinichi Takagi	Lexus RC F GT3	D	78	+4 laps
17	GT300	87	JLOC	(Japan) Kosuke Matsuura (Japan) Natsu Sakaguchi	Lamborghini Huracán GT3 Evo 2	Y	78	+4 laps
18	GT300	666	Seven x Seven Racing	(Japan) Kiyoto Fujinami (Japan) Tsubasa Kondo	Porsche 911 GT3 R (992)	Y	78	+4 laps
19	GT300	0	JLOC	(Japan) Takashi Kogure (Japan) Yuya Motojima	Lamborghini Huracán GT3 Evo 2	Y	78	+4 laps
20	GT300	2	Hyper Water Racing Inging	(Japan) Yuui Tsutsumi (Japan) Hibiki Taira	Toyota GR86 GT300	B	78	+4 laps
21	GT300	11	GAINER	(Japan) Ryuichiro Tomita (Japan) Kazuki Oki	Nissan Fairlady Z GT300 (RZ34)	D	78	+4 laps
22	GT300	45	Ponos Racing	(Japan) Kei Cozzolino (Japan) Takuro Shinohara	Ferrari 296 GT3	D	78	+4 laps
23	GT300	61	R&D Sport	(Japan) Takuto Iguchi (Japan) Hideki Yamauchi	Subaru BRZ GT300 (ZD8)	D	78	+4 laps
24	GT300	60	LM corsa	(Japan) Hiroki Yoshimoto (Japan) Shunsuke Kohno	Lexus LC 500 GT	D	77	+5 laps
25	GT300	25	Hoppy Team Tsuchiya	(Japan) Takamitsu Matsui (Japan) Kimiya Sato	Toyota GR Supra GT500	Y	77	+5 laps
26	GT300	5	Team Mach	(Japan) Yusuke Shiotsu (Japan) Iori Kimura	Toyota 86 MC GT300	Y	77	+5 laps
27	GT300	7	CarGuy MKS Racing	(United Kingdom) Zak O'Sullivan (Japan) Rikuto Kobayashi	Ferrari 296 GT3	Y	77	+5 laps
28	GT300	360	Tomei Sports	(Japan) Takayuki Aoki (Japan) Rin Arakawa	Nissan GT-R Nismo GT3	Y	77	+5 laps
29	GT300	62	HELM Motorsports	(Japan) Yuya Hiraki (Japan) Reiji Hiraki	Nissan GT-R Nismo GT3	Y	77	+5 laps
30	GT300	30	apr	(Japan) Hiroaki Nagai (Japan) Manabu Orido	Toyota GR86 GT300	MI	77	+5 laps
31	GT300	18	Team UpGarage	(Japan) Takashi Kobayashi (Japan) Yuto Nomura	Mercedes-AMG GT3 Evo	Y	76	+6 laps
32	GT300	31	apr	(Japan) Miki Koyama (Japan) Yuki Nemoto	Lexus LC 500h GT	B	76	+6 laps
33	GT300	48	Nilzz Racing	(Japan) Taiyo Ida (Japan) Yusaku Shibata	Nissan GT-R Nismo GT3	Y	76	+6 laps
34	GT300	777	D'station Racing	(Japan) Tomonobu Fujii (United Kingdom) Charlie Fagg	Aston Martin Vantage AMR GT3 Evo	D	75	+7 laps
35	GT300	22	R'Qs Motor Sports	(Japan) Masaki Kano (Japan) Yuma Shoji	Mercedes-AMG GT3 Evo	Y	75	+7 laps
36	GT500	24	Kondo Racing	(Japan) Tsugio Matsuda (Japan) Teppei Natori	Nissan Z NISMO GT500	Y	70	+12 Laps
37	GT500	19	TGR Team WedsSport Bandoh	(Japan) Yuji Kunimoto (Japan) Sena Sakaguchi	Toyota GR Supra GT500	Y	65	+17 Laps
Ret	GT300	52	Saitama Green Brave	(Japan) Hiroki Yoshida (Japan) Seita Nonaka	Toyota GR Supra GT300	B	37	Accident damage
Ret	GT300	20	SHADE Racing	(Japan) Katsuyuki Hiranaka (Japan) Eijiro Shimizu	Toyota GR86 GT300	MI	35	Wheel hub
Ret	GT500	38	TGR Team KeePer Cerumo	(Japan) Hiroaki Ishiura (Japan) Toshiki Oyu	Toyota GR Supra GT500	B	4	Crash
Ret	GT500	16	ARTA	(Japan) Hiroki Otsu (Japan) Ren Sato	Honda Civic Type R-GT	B	4	Crash
Ret	GT500	12	Team Impul	(Belgium) Bertrand Baguette (Japan) Kazuki Hiramine	Nissan Z NISMO GT500	B	4	Crash
DSQ	GT300	6	Velorex	(Japan) Yoshiaki Katayama (Spain) Roberto Merhi	Ferrari 296 GT3	Y	?	Disqualified

Super GT Series
Previous race: 2024 Suzuka GT 300 km Race	2025 season	Next race: 2025 Fuji GT 3 Hours
