= Nissan Z (RZ34) =

Seventh-generation of the Nissan Z sports car

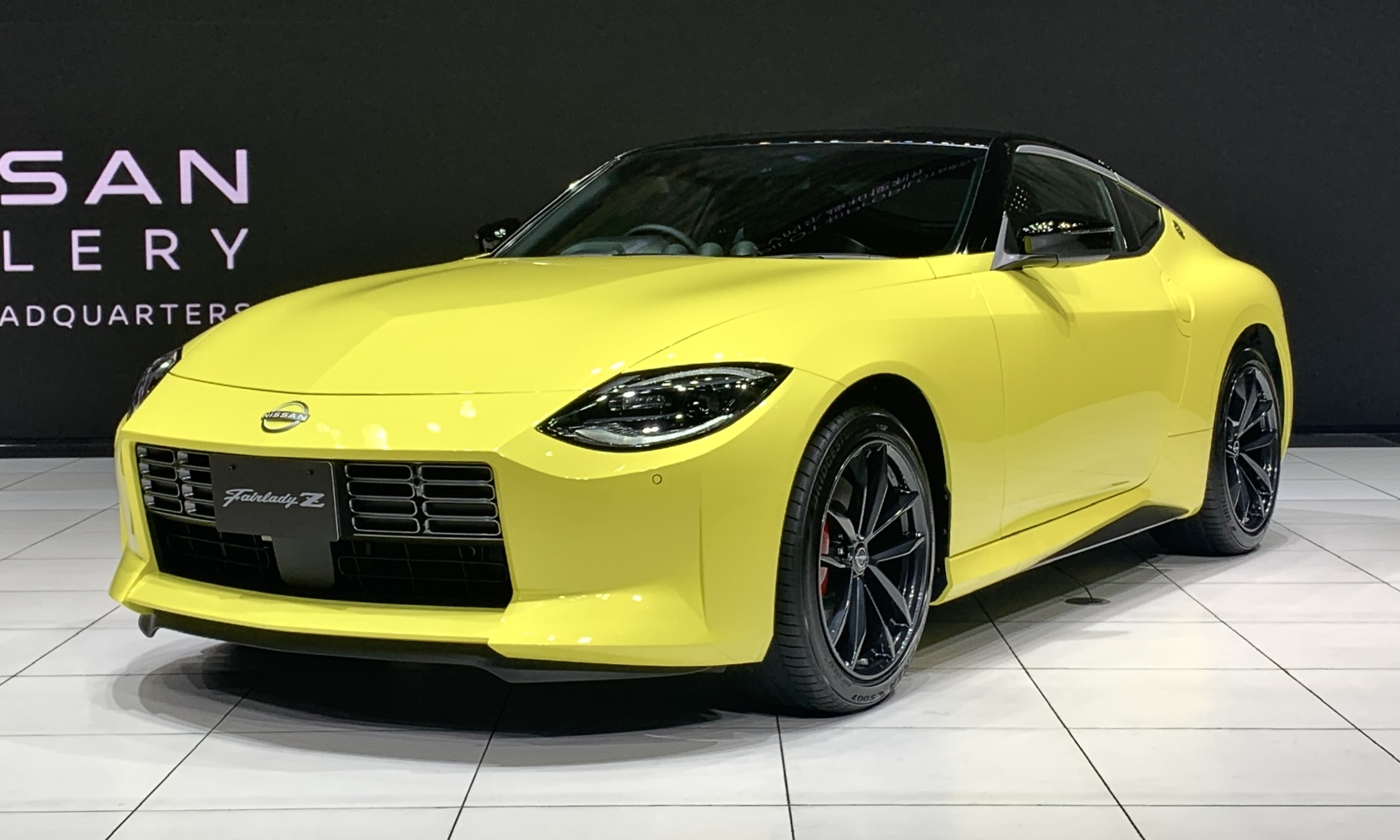
- 2022 Nissan Fairlady Z Version ST

Overview
- Manufacturer: Nissan
- Model code: RZ34
- Also called: Nissan Fairlady Z (Japan and Indonesia)
- Production: April 2022 – present
- Model years: 2023–present
- Assembly: Japan: Kaminokawa, Tochigi (Nissan Motor Tochigi Plant)
- Designer: Naoyuki Ohkoshi (exterior); Takuya Yamashita (interior)

Body and chassis
- Class: Sports car (S)
- Body style: 3-door liftback coupe
- Layout: Front mid-engine, rear-wheel-drive
- Platform: Nissan FM platform
- Related: Nissan 370Z

Powertrain
- Engine: 3.0 L VR30DDTT twin-turbo V6
- Power output: 400 hp (298 kW; 406 PS) 350 lb⋅ft (475 N⋅m; 48 kg⋅m); 420 hp (313 kW; 426 PS) 384 lb⋅ft (521 N⋅m; 53 kg⋅m) (Z Nismo)
- Transmission: 9-speed Jatco JR913E/Mercedes-9G-Tronic automatic; 6-speed FS6R31A manual

Dimensions
- Wheelbase: 2,550 mm (100.4 in)
- Length: 4,380 mm (172.4 in)
- Width: 1,845 mm (72.6 in)
- Height: 1,315 mm (51.8 in)
- Curb weight: 1,581–1,680 kg (3,486–3,704 lb)

Chronology
- Predecessor: Nissan 370Z (Z34)

The Nissan Z, known in Japan and Indonesia as the Nissan Fairlady Z (Japanese: 日産・フェアレディZ, Hepburn: Nissan Fearedi Zetto), is the seventh generation of the Z-car line of sports cars manufactured by Nissan. The model succeeded the 370Z, using a modified and revised version of the previous generation's platform. The model also drops the numerical naming of the previous generations.

The Z was introduced as a concept car in September 2020 as the Z Proto concept, and was announced as a production car form in August 2021. It featured Nissan's VR30DDTT engine and built on an evolution of Nissan FM Z34 platform, giving a model code "RZ34". It also has two transmission options, a 6-speed manual and a 9-speed automatic transmission. Deliveries began in late 2022 and was offered with two trims, "Performance" and "Sport". More powerful and track-focused, Z Nismo was introduced in July 2023 with significant upgrades over the standard version. The Z is also involved in various motorsports, such as in Super GT and GT4 Racing. It is well received among car enthusiasts and motor publications with winning a Drive's Car of The Year award and becoming a finalist of World Car of The Year awards.

== History ==
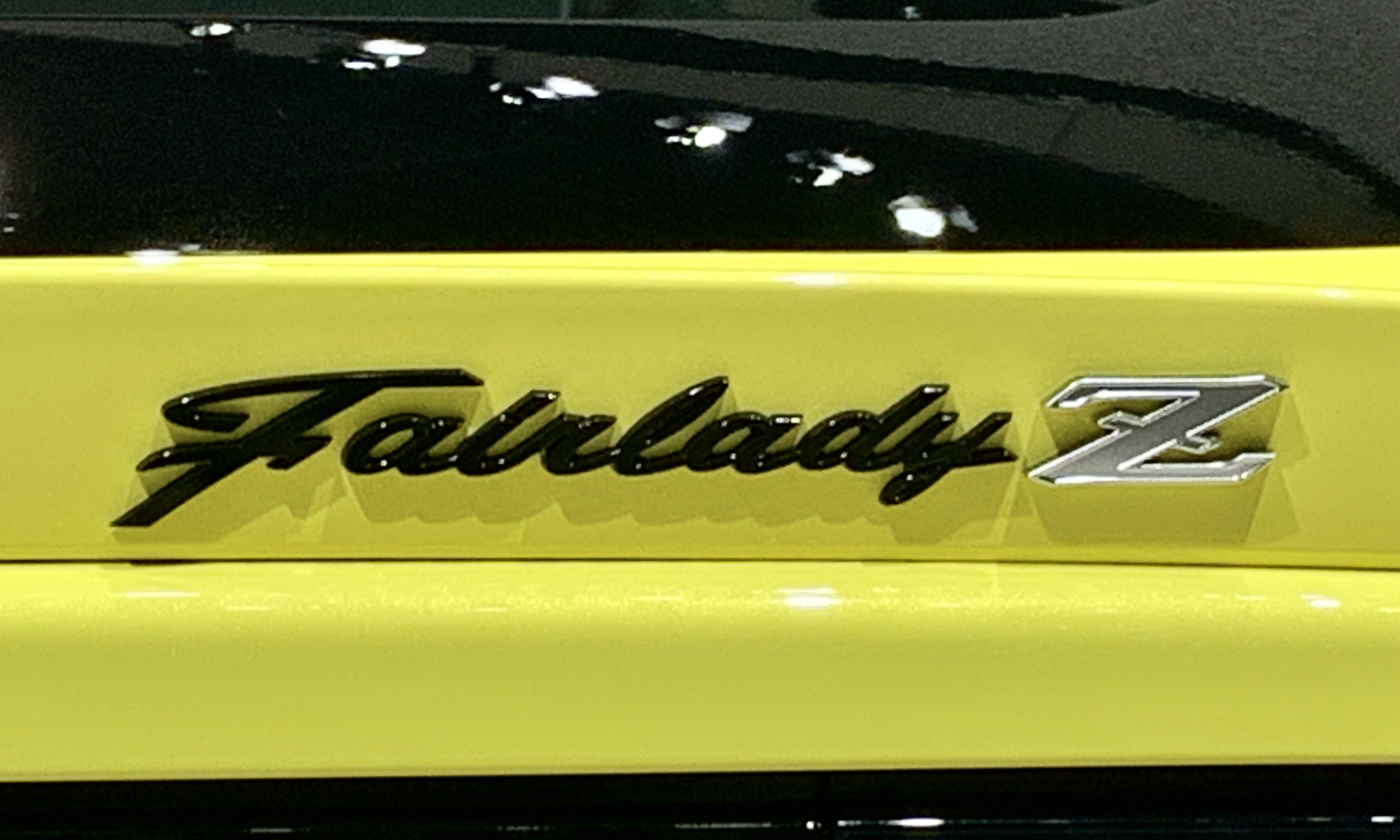
The Fairlady Z logo.

In 2018, the seventh-generation Nissan Z was first hinted at by Alfonso Albaisa, Senior Vice President for Global Design of Nissan, confirmed to Australian automotive magazine WhichCar that a direct successor to the Nissan 370Z was in development.

On March 19, 2020, Nissan filed a trademark for a new version of the Z-car logo. On May 28, 2020, as part of Nissan's global restructuring plan, named "Nissan Next", Nissan's official YouTube channel released a short video showcasing its updated vehicle lineup, including the new Z-car; this video also confirmed that the new Z-car would have retro styling, with its overall shape and circular running lights referencing the 240Z.

On September 15, 2020, Nissan revealed the prototype version called the "Nissan Z Proto Concept". The prototype was 4,382 mm (172.5 in) long, which is 142 mm (5.6 in) longer than the 370Z, and the same width.

In August 2021, Nissan unveiled the price, specs, and details of the production Z in New York City

=== Facelift (2026) ===
The facelifted version of the Z was revealed at the 2026 Tokyo Auto Salon on January 9, 2026. A new Z badge on the hood replaces the Nissan logo and a new front bumper design is used, which is inspired by the S30.

For the US market, the facelifted Nissan Z was announced in March 2026, for the 2027 model year. A manual transmission became available on the Z Nismo, which also received front brakes from the R35 GT-R. The standard Z received a new front fascia, similar to the Heritage edition that was available for the 2025 model year.

== Production ==
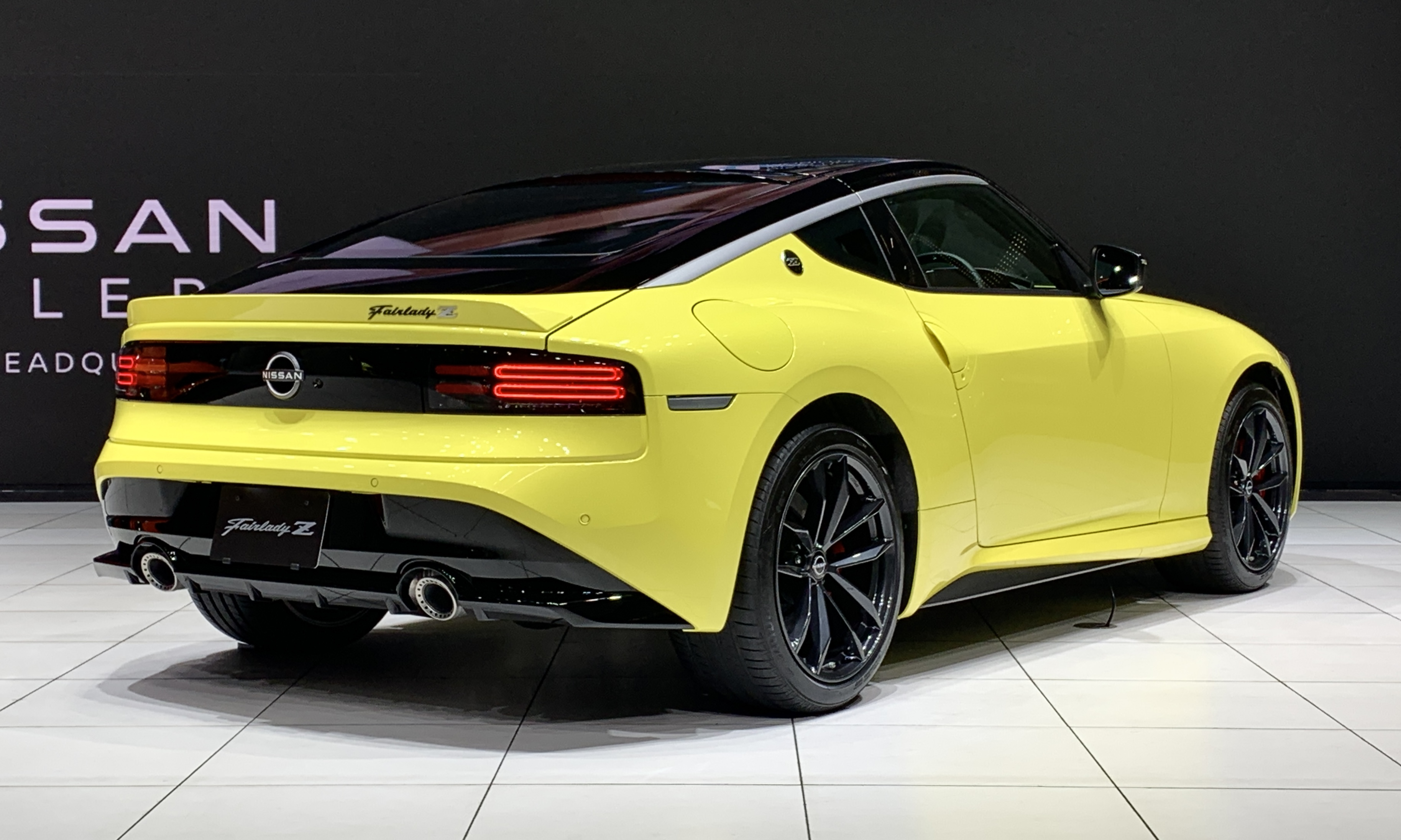
Rear view

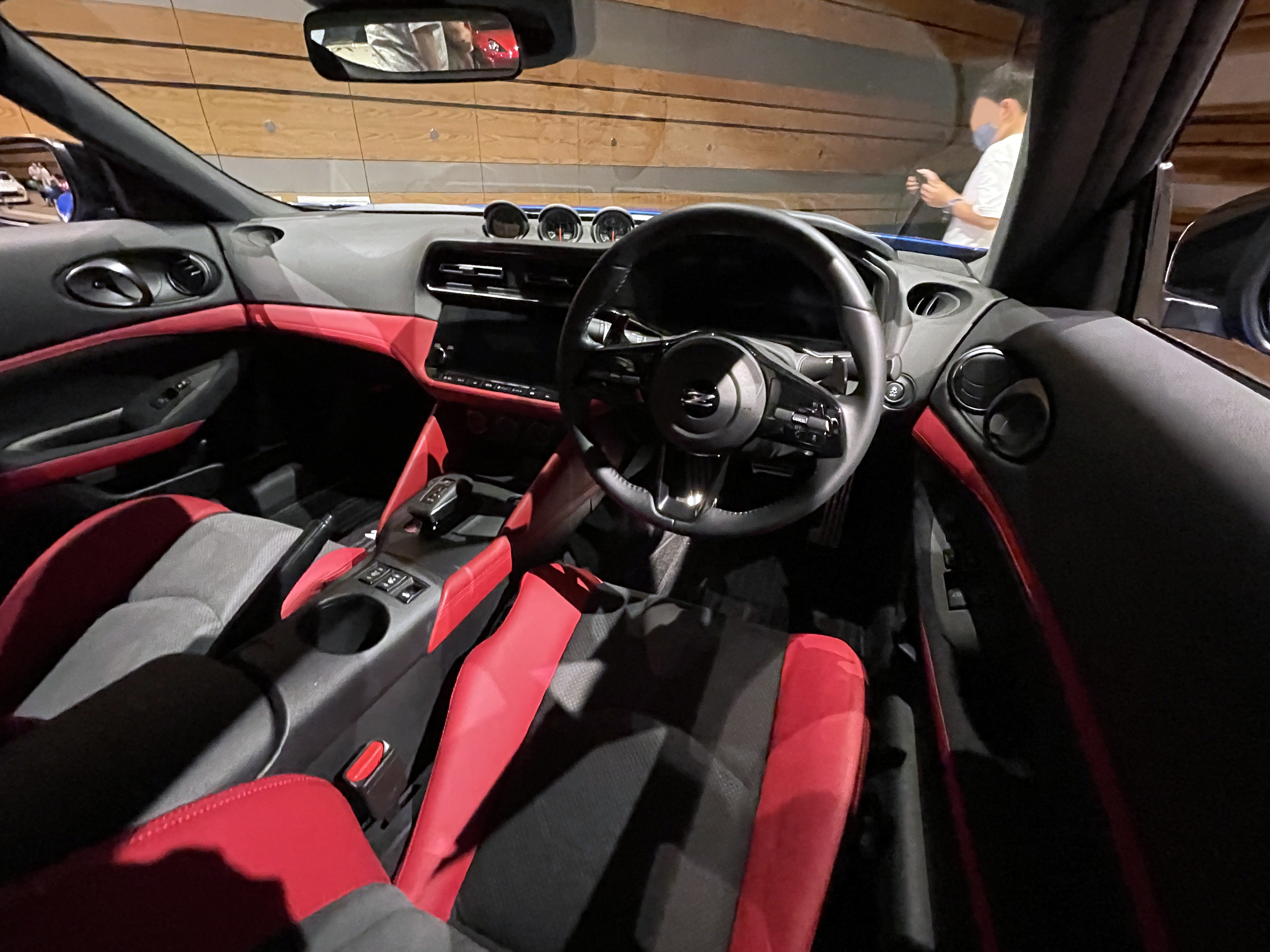
Interior

The production model Z was foreshadowed by the Z Proto concept, which was presented on September 15, 2020. The production version of the Z was unveiled on August 17, 2021, at New York City by Nissan's official YouTube channel, and the car was presented by Cody Walker (brother of Paul Walker). The production model was offered in two trim levels: Z Sport (Fairlady Z Version S in Japan) and Z Performance (Fairlady Z Version ST in Japan). Production of the new Z, began in April 2022, with sales set to begin in June 2022. However, in April 2022, Nissan announced that worldwide deliveries of the Z will be delayed until mid 2022, due to the impact of the supply parts. Deliveries began in late 2022. Nissan achieved 263 U.S. sales in fiscal year 2022 and 1,771 U.S. sales in fiscal year 2023, for a total of 2,034 Z units sold in the United states as of December 31, 2023.

Nissan announced that the Z would not be available for European markets including the United Kingdom, Ireland, Türkiye and Ukraine, due to strict emissions and noise regulations. The Z is only sold in the Japanese, North American, Australian, New Zealand, Southeast Asian, Middle Eastern (GCC countries) and Latin American markets. Pricing for the Japanese market Z was announced in April 2022, with the base version S (Sport version) starting at ¥5,241,500 (US$41,081 as of exchange rates at the time), and the version ST (Performance version) starting at ¥6,462,500 (US$50,650 as of exchange rates at the time). United States pricing was also announced, starting at US$41,015 for the Sport version, and US$51,015 for the Performance version.

=== Z Proto Launch Edition ===
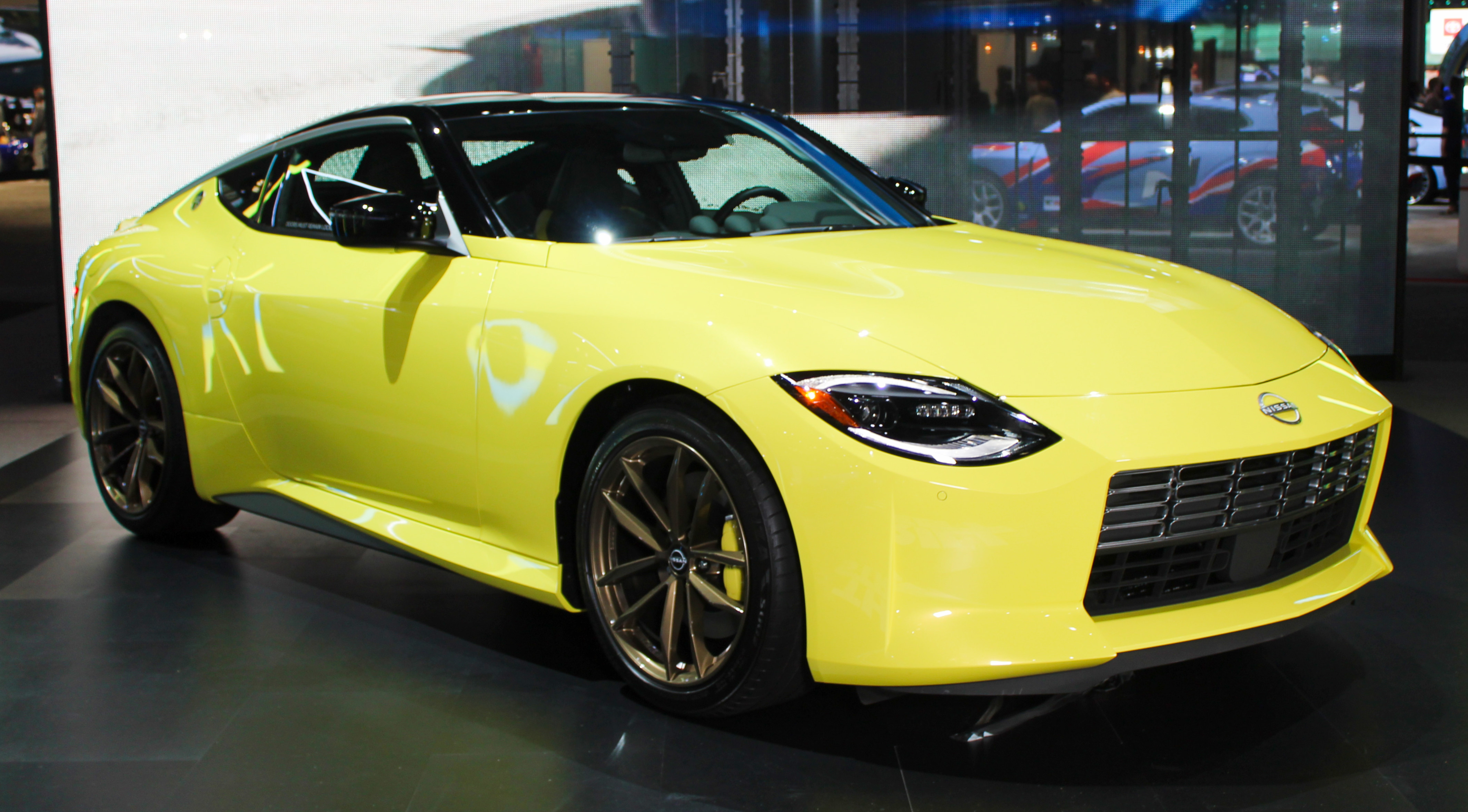
Nissan Z Proto Launch Edition at 2022 New York International Auto Show.

Following the introduction of the Z, Nissan announced that a manual and automatic transmission launch edition will be on sale before the production model. Named the "Z Proto Spec Edition", it will be limited to 240 units and have the same features as the Nissan Z Proto concept, including the black and yellow exterior color tone, bronze wheels with yellow brake calipers, black seats with yellow stitching and accents, and a yellow shift knob. The Z Proto Launch Edition also featured yellow stitching throughout the cabin, suede and cloth door trim panels and Proto Spec badging. Japanese market pricing for the Z Proto spec starts at ¥6,966,300 (US$54,599 as of current exchange rates). Pricing for United States starts at US$54,015.

Fairlady Z Customized Proto

At the 2022 Tokyo Auto Salon, Nissan unveiled a one-off prototype named Fairlady Z Customized Proto, which was slightly different than the Z Proto Launch Edition. Nissan claimed they introduced this Proto to honor its predecessors heritage and to "gauge customer and fan interest for potential future accessory offerings".

This Fairlady Z Customized Proto features a new orange body color, split front grille, black eight-spoke wheels with "Nissan Z" badged tires, black graphics package with black roof, accents and stripes, front fender flares and carbon-fiber front splitter and side skirts. No technical changes have been made from the production version Z.

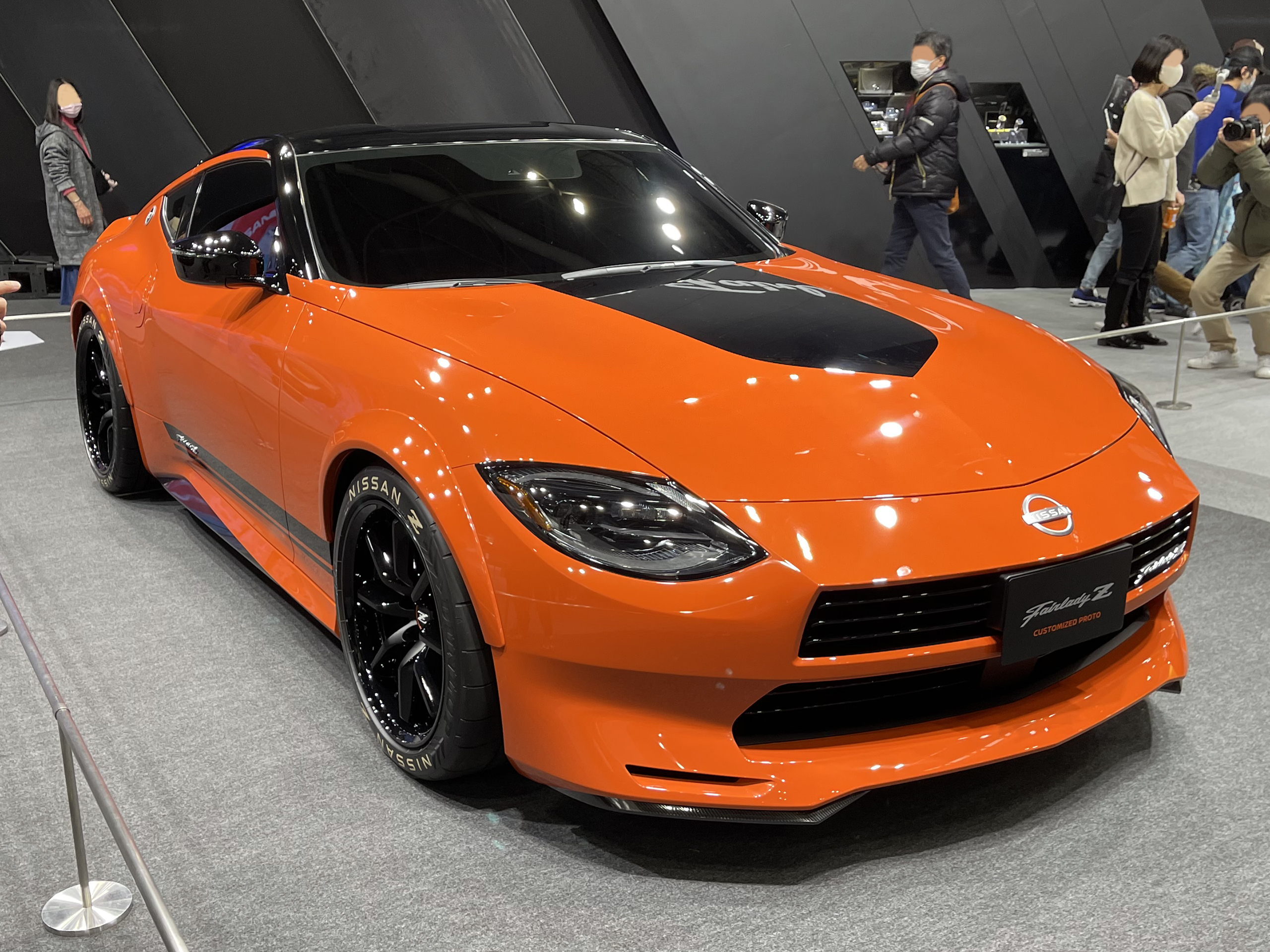
Fairlady Z Customized Proto at 2022 Osaka Auto Messe

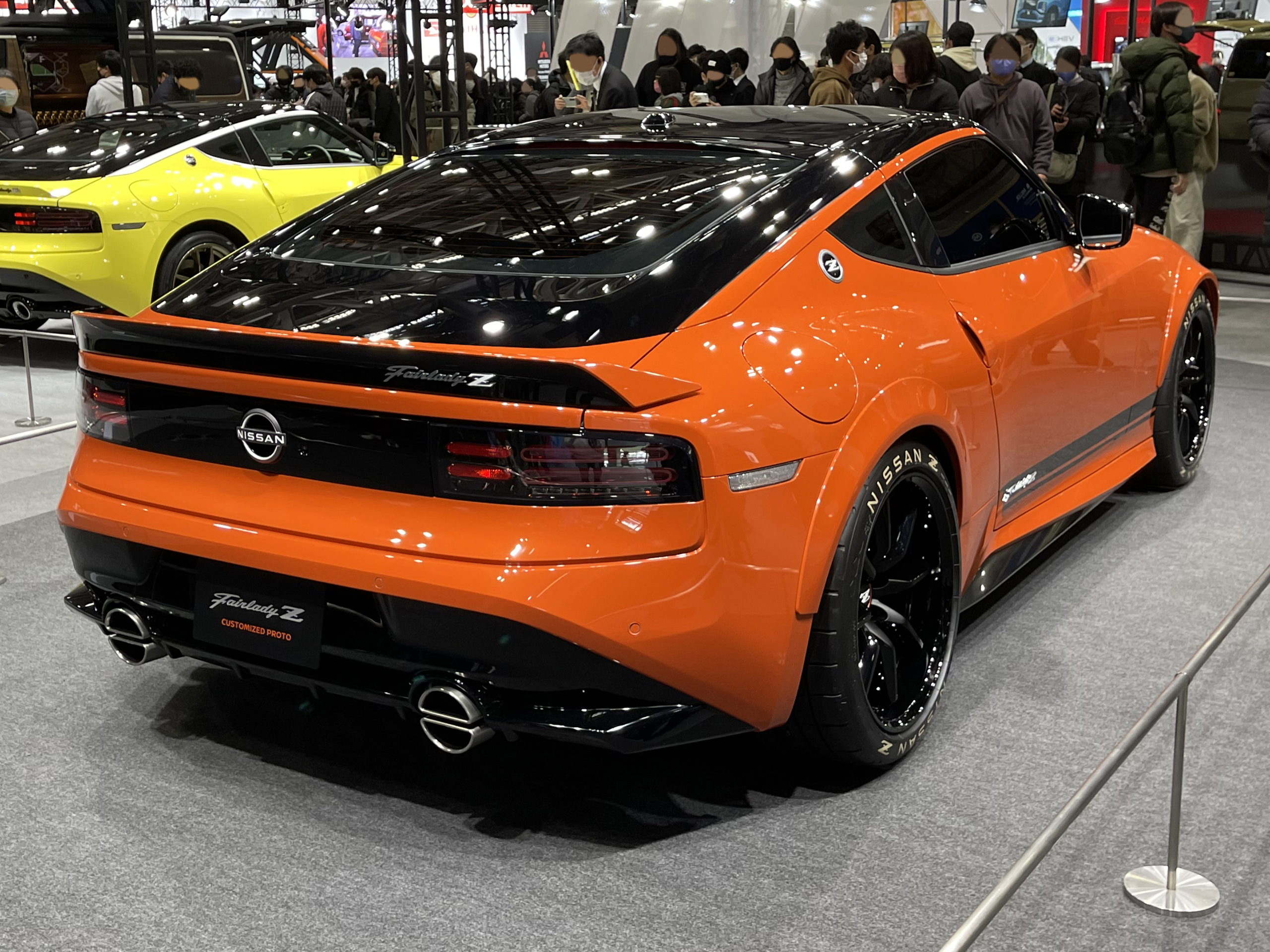
Rear view

=== Z Performance ===
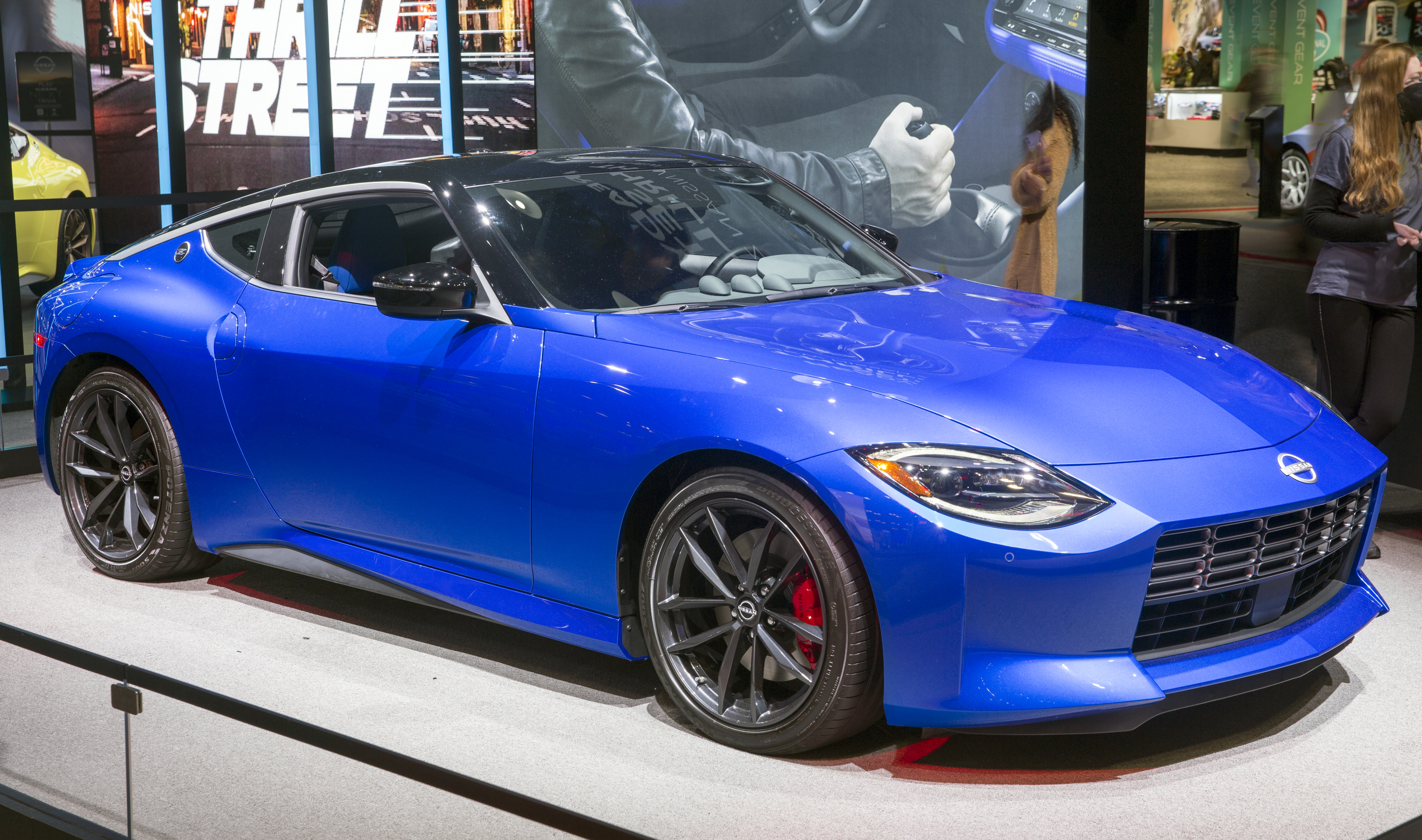
Nissan Z Performance in Seiran Blue body color at 2022 New York Auto Show

The Z Performance (known as Fairlady Z Version ST in Japan) has the same VR30DDTT, a 3.0-liter twin turbocharged V6 engine, generating a maximum power output of 298 kW (400 hp; 405 PS) at 6,400 rpm and 475 N⋅m (350 lb⋅ft; 48 kg⋅m) of torque at 1,600 to 5,600 rpm with a redline at 6,800 rpm. This trim also has the same 6-speed manual transmission and 9-speed automatic transmission. This trim retains all the features and upgrades of the base Sport trim as well as other features.

Other upgrades includes: SynchroRev Match rev-matching system for manual transmission models, GT-R-inspired paddle shifters with launch control for automatic transmission models, an even sportier suspension setup over the Sport trim, larger brake rotors with 14.0-inch for the front and 13.8-inch in the rear and also red floating aluminum calipers with 4-piston up front and 2-piston for the rear. For the Performance trim, Nissan also offers a mechanical clutch-type limited-slip differential, 19-inch Rays super lightweight forged alloy wheels with Bridgestone Potenza S007 high-performance street tires, front and rear spoilers to improve downforce, sports dual exhaust outlets, heated leather seats with four-way power-adjustable, 9.0-inch touchscreen infotainment with navigation, NissanConnect services and 8-speaker Bose audio system. The manual transmission version has curb weight of 1,604 kg (3,536 lb) and the automatic transmission version has a curb weight of 1,634 kg (3,602 lb).

=== Z Nismo ===
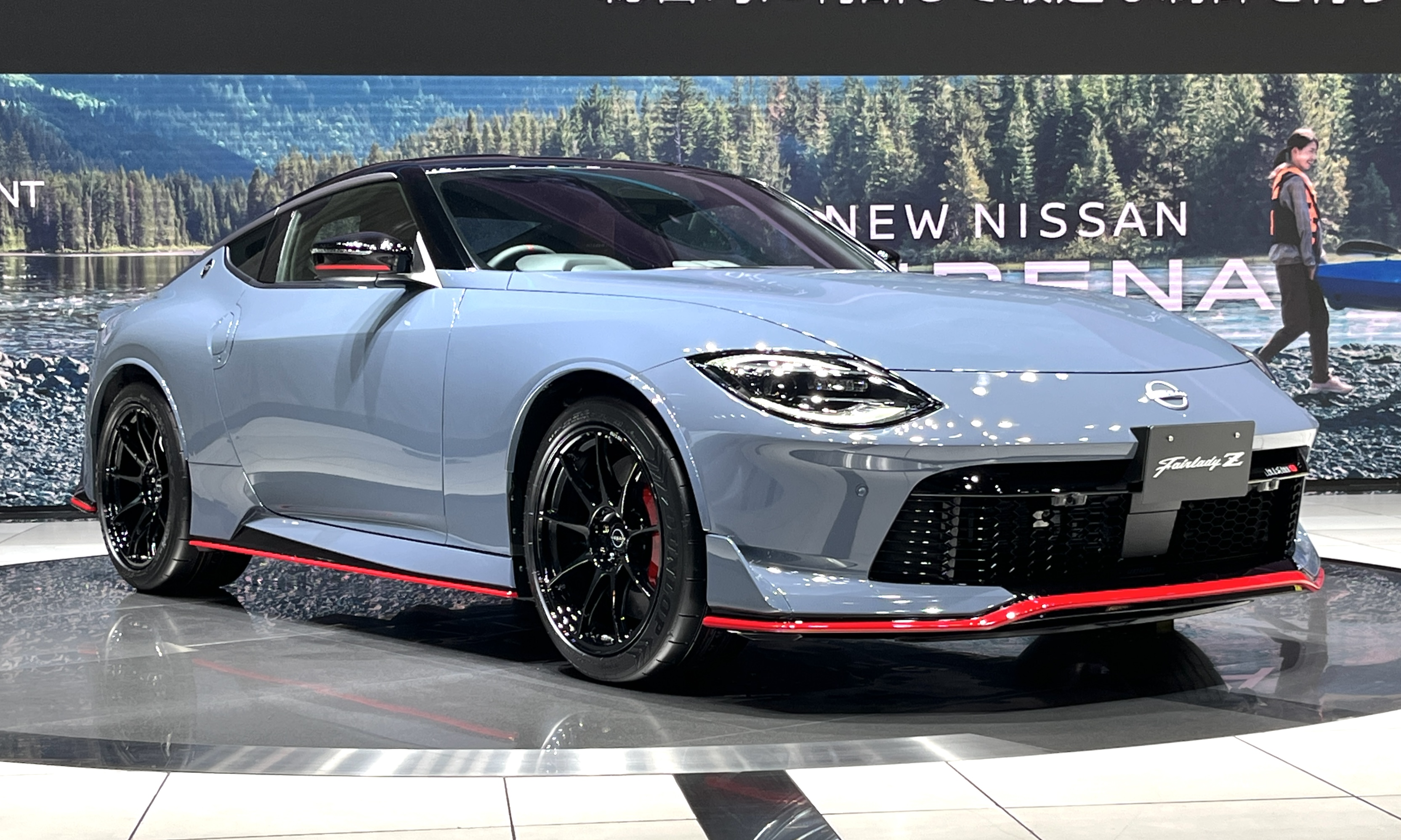

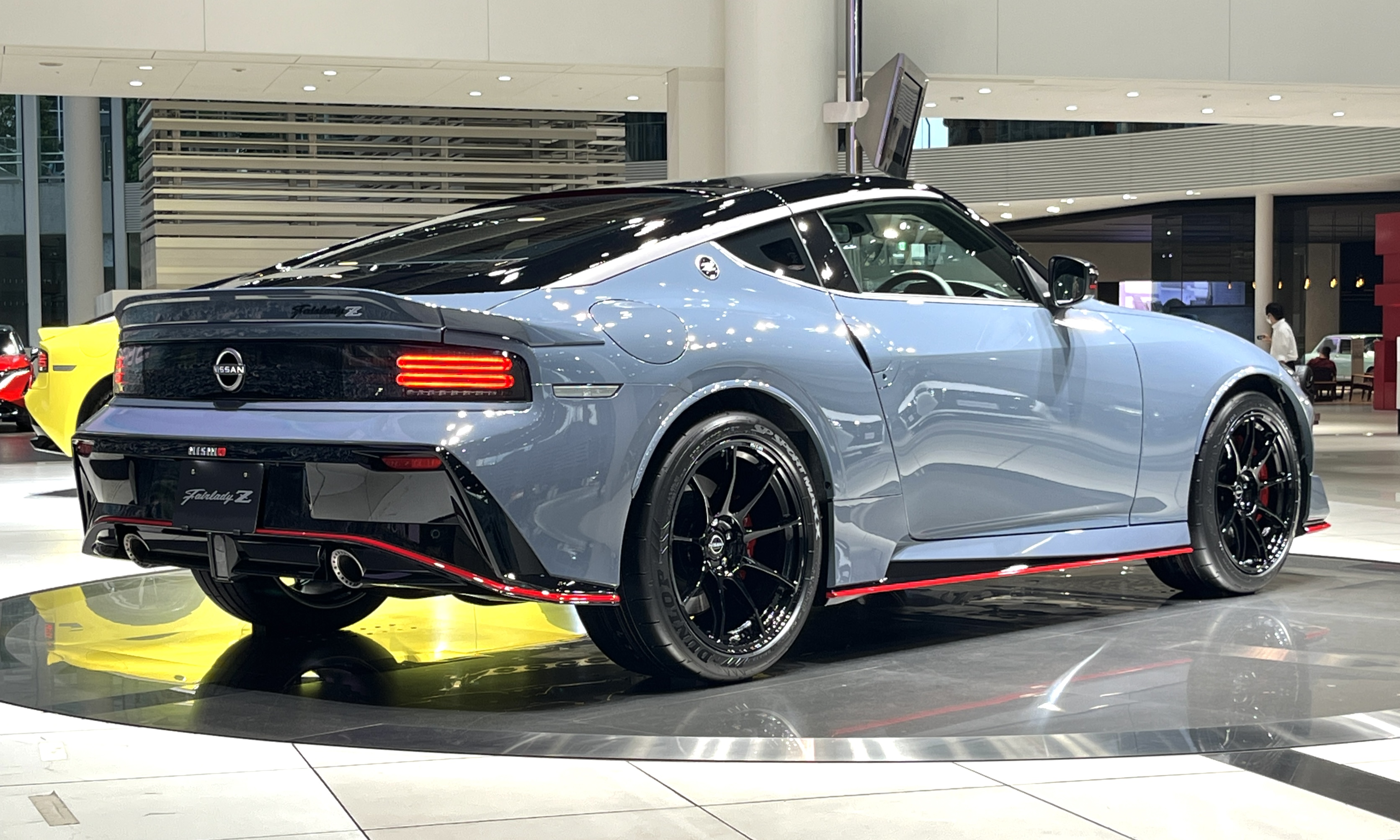
Nissan Z NISMO

The Z Nismo was revealed on August 1, 2023 for the 2024 model year, with significant upgrades over the standard Z both visually and mechanically. The VR30DDTT engine of the Z Nismo was offered with a redesigned wastegate, enhanced ignition timing, engine cooling and oil cooling system, inspired by the GT-R Nismo. Maximum power output of the upgraded engine is now rated at 420 hp (313 kW; 426 PS) at 6,400 rpm and 384 lb⋅ft (521 N⋅m; 53 kg⋅m) of torque at 2,000 to 5,200 rpm. The car initially featured the 9-speed automatic transmission with Nismo-tuned clutch packs and engine management software, with downshifts twice as fast and a aggressive launch control system. However, the 6-speed manual transmission option has been announced for the 2026 model year. A new "Sport+" driving mode was introduced in Z Nismo; to allow quick downshifts so the driver would not have the need to use the paddle shifters. Chassis upgrades include additional bracing, increasing torsional rigidity by 2.5 percent over the Z Performance. Carbon-fiber driveshaft of the standard Z is replaced by a steel driveshaft. In case of suspension upgrades, stiffer bushings, mounting points and larger dampers were added to the Z Nismo. Its upgraded brakes featured larger 4-piston calipers, 15.0-inch brake rotors in the front and 13.8-inch rotors in the rear, clamped by a heavy-duty brake pad. Overall curb weight of the car is now rated at 1,680 kg (3,704 lb).

Visual upgrades include an upgraded front fascia with a reworked grille, nose and front-spoiler, providing additional engine cooling and downforce. A three-piece rear spoiler was also offered. New exclusive Nismo wheels are wider and more painted in gloss-black paint color. They were wrapped up by the stickier and track-focused Dunlop SP Sport MAXX GT600 tires. Interior of the car featured a red and black color theme, along with the new Recaro bucket seats, revisions were made to the steering wheel, speedometer as well as for the infotainment system. The Z Nismo went on sale with a limited production number in the third quarter of 2023.

On December 17, 2025, Nissan introduced the manual transmission variant in the US for the 2026 model year.

== Specifications ==
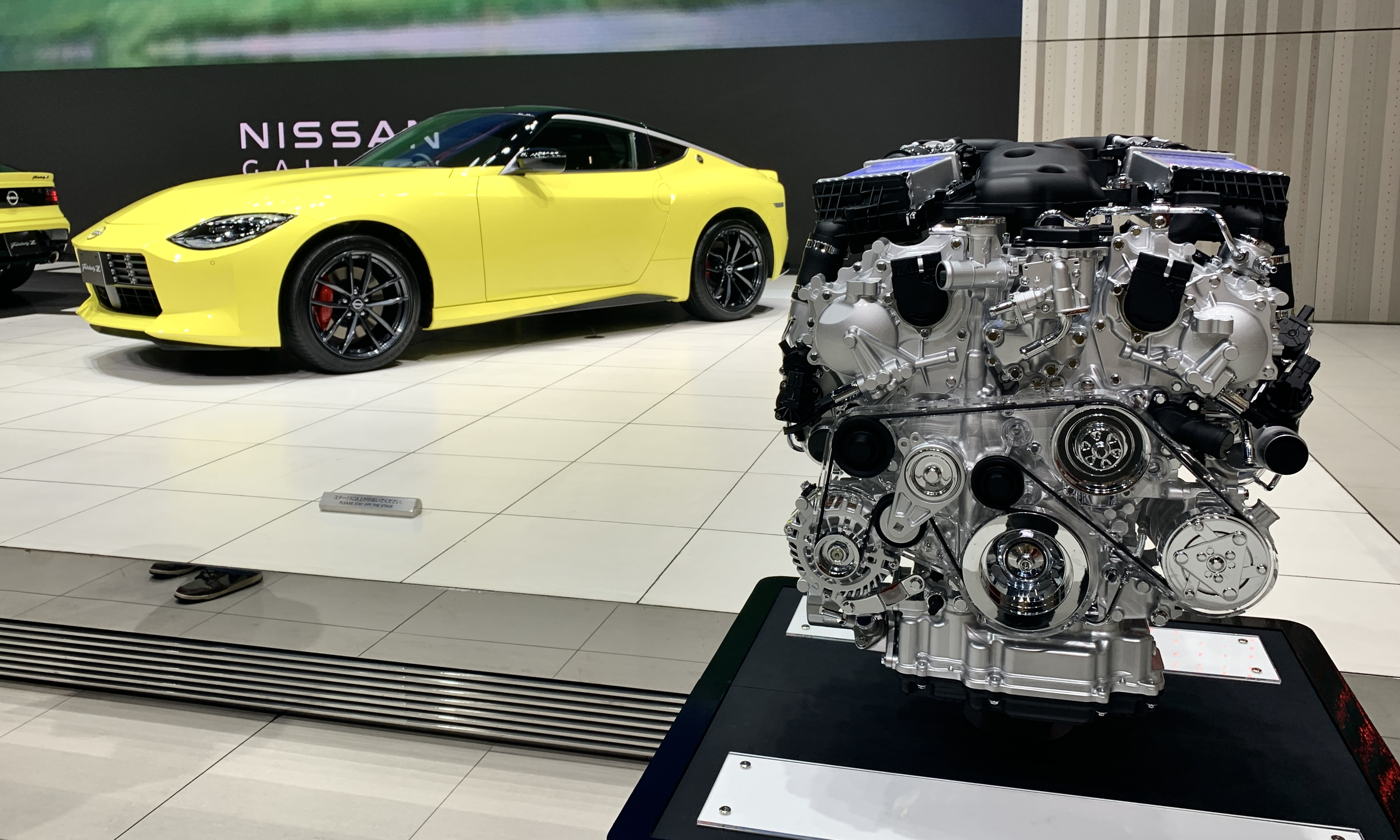
The VR30DDTT engine alongside the Nissan Z

The Nissan Z features the same platform, manual transmission and architecture of the 370Z, while making use of a nine-speed automatic transmission used previously in other cars such as the Nissan Frontier. "To be honest, [for] around 80 per cent of the body we changed the parts. [However], carryover of parts is very important for us and carryover means reality of affordability so you will be able to enjoy some affordability," said Hiroshi Tamura, chief product specialist of the Nissan Z to Australian publication CarExpert about the part sharing with the 370Z.

The Nissan Z (base Sport trim known as Fairlady Z Version S in Japan) uses the same VR30DDTT engine from the Infiniti Red Sport 400 models (known as the Nissan Skyline 400R V37 in Japan), and the same Nissan FM Platform from previous two generations of the Z. The VR30DDTT is a 3.0-liter twin turbocharged V6 engine generating a maximum power output of 298 kW (400 hp; 405 PS) at 6,400 rpm and 475 N⋅m (350 lb⋅ft; 48 kg⋅m) of torque at 1600 to 5600 rpm with a redline of 6,800 rpm. The engine also features direct injection and variable valve timing, running up to 14.7 psi (101 kPa) of boost. Manual transmission models get a carbon-fibre driveshaft, an EXEDY performance clutch, and a rev-matching system on downshifts. Automatic transmission models get launch control and aluminum paddle shifters.

=== Transmission ===
The Z has a 6-speed manual transmission, continuing this tradition from previous generation Z models. It is also offered with an optional 9-speed Mercedes-Benz 9G-Tronic automatic transmission with launch control, manufactured under license of Jatco and re-branded as "JR913E".

=== Interior ===
The interior was designed with the help of Nismo and SuperGT GT500 class racing driver, Tsugio Matsuda. The interior features a customizable 12.3-inch TFT instrument display, programmable shift indicator, three analog gauges that shows turbocharger boost, turbocharger tach (rpm), and battery voltage (which are perched on top of the dash, angled towards the driver), manually adjustable sport bucket seats similar to those found in the GT-R and can be adjusted eight-way for the driver side and four-way on the passenger side. Customers can choose the interior color in Black, Red, or Blue colors. Nissan also offered an 8.0-inch touchscreen infotainment system with navigation and NissanConnect Services, six-speaker Bose audio system with active noise cancellation and active sound enhancement. Standard safety and tech includes; lane departure warning, automatic braking with pedestrian detection, Apple CarPlay and Android Auto, and Intelligent Cruise Control.

=== Exterior ===
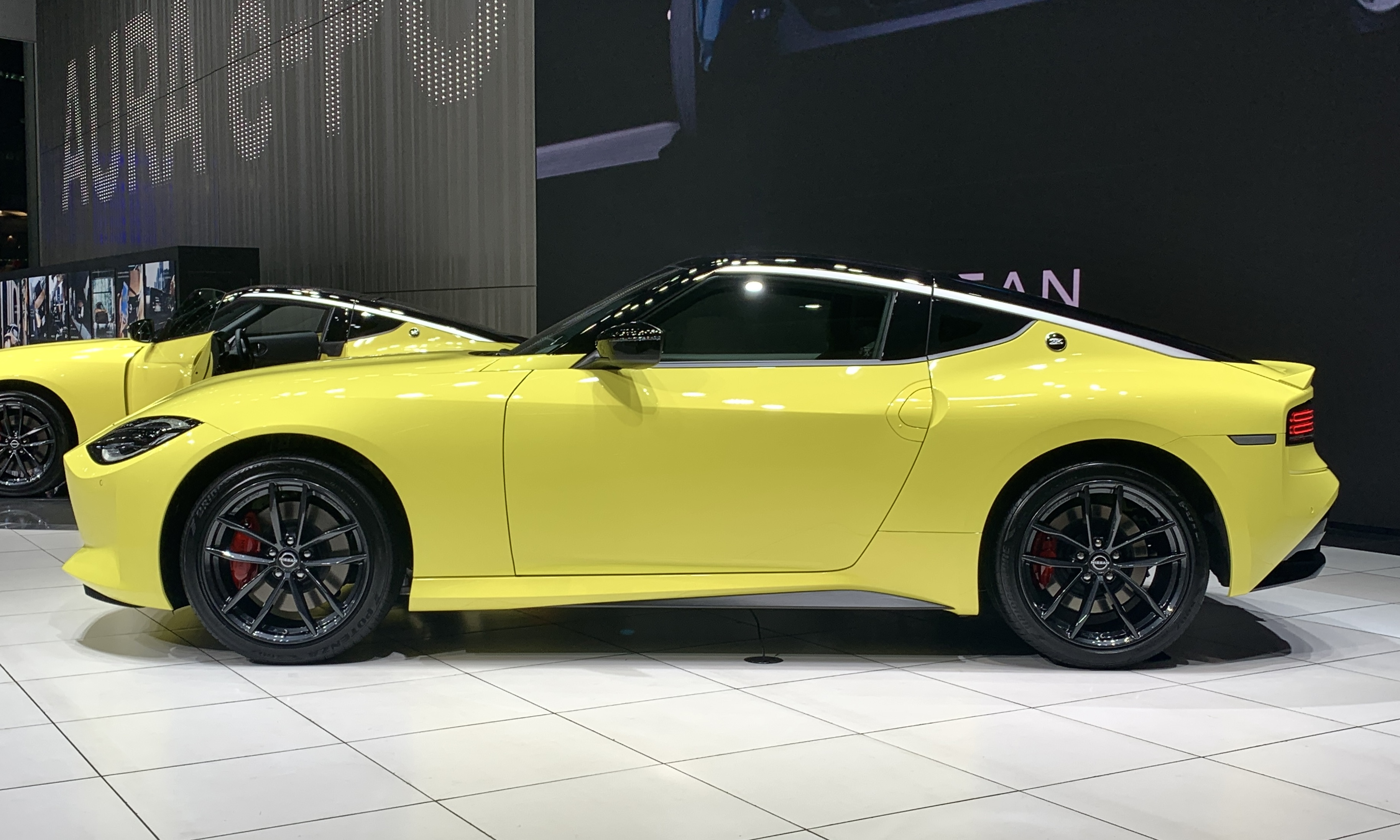
Nissan Z side view features the Samurai Blade roofline

The exterior design is inspired by previous generations of the Z. The taillights are similar to the Z32 Nissan 300ZX, and it uses the S30 Fairlady Z's emblem. The distinctive headlights of the Z34 were also changed to a rounded LED type. The front mask also adopted a distinctive style with a sharp, large grille, similar to the S30 and the Z33.

The Nissan Z is available with three single tone exterior paint options, and six two-tone schemes. Included in the single tone options are Black Diamond Pearl, Gun Metallic, and Rosewood Metallic. The two-tone options pair a Super Black roof with the following colors; Brilliant Silver Metallic, Boulder Gray Pearl, Seiran Blue TriCoat, Ikazuchi Yellow TriCoat, Passion Red TriCoat, or Everest White TriCoat. The car also has dual body-colored side mirrors with integrated LED turn signals. The hood, doors, and hatchback are all made of lightweight aluminum. The Sport version Z has a curb weight of 1,581 kg (3,486 lb) for the manual transmission version, while the automatic transmission weighs at 1,610 kg (3,549 lb).

=== Suspension, brakes and wheels ===
The suspension setup of the new Z has double-wishbone aluminum suspension with increased caster angle on the front, improving straight-line tracking and high-speed stability. A front strut tower brace stiffens up the front structure and a rear multilink suspension has been offered. It also comes with even wider tires than the 370Z, larger diameter monotube shocks, and enhanced body rigidity to help improve cornering. Nissan offered 12.6-inch rotors for the front and 12.1-inch units for the rear, gripped by the fixed two-piston front calipers and single-piston rear calipers. The Z has 18-inch aluminum alloy wheels with Yokohama Advan tires.

=== Performance ===
The Z has a limited top speed of 249 km/h (155 mph). In a drag race conducted by Hagerty, a Z Performance automatic transmission version accelerated from 0 to 97 km/h (0 to 60 mph) in 4.0 seconds and completed the 1/4 mile (402 metres) in 12.3 seconds at 187 km/h (116 mph). The manual transmission version accelerated from 0 to 97 km/h (0 to 60 mph) in 4.3 seconds and completed the quarter mile in 12.8 seconds at 180 km/h (112 mph).

== Motorsports ==
=== Super GT ===
Nissan Z GT500
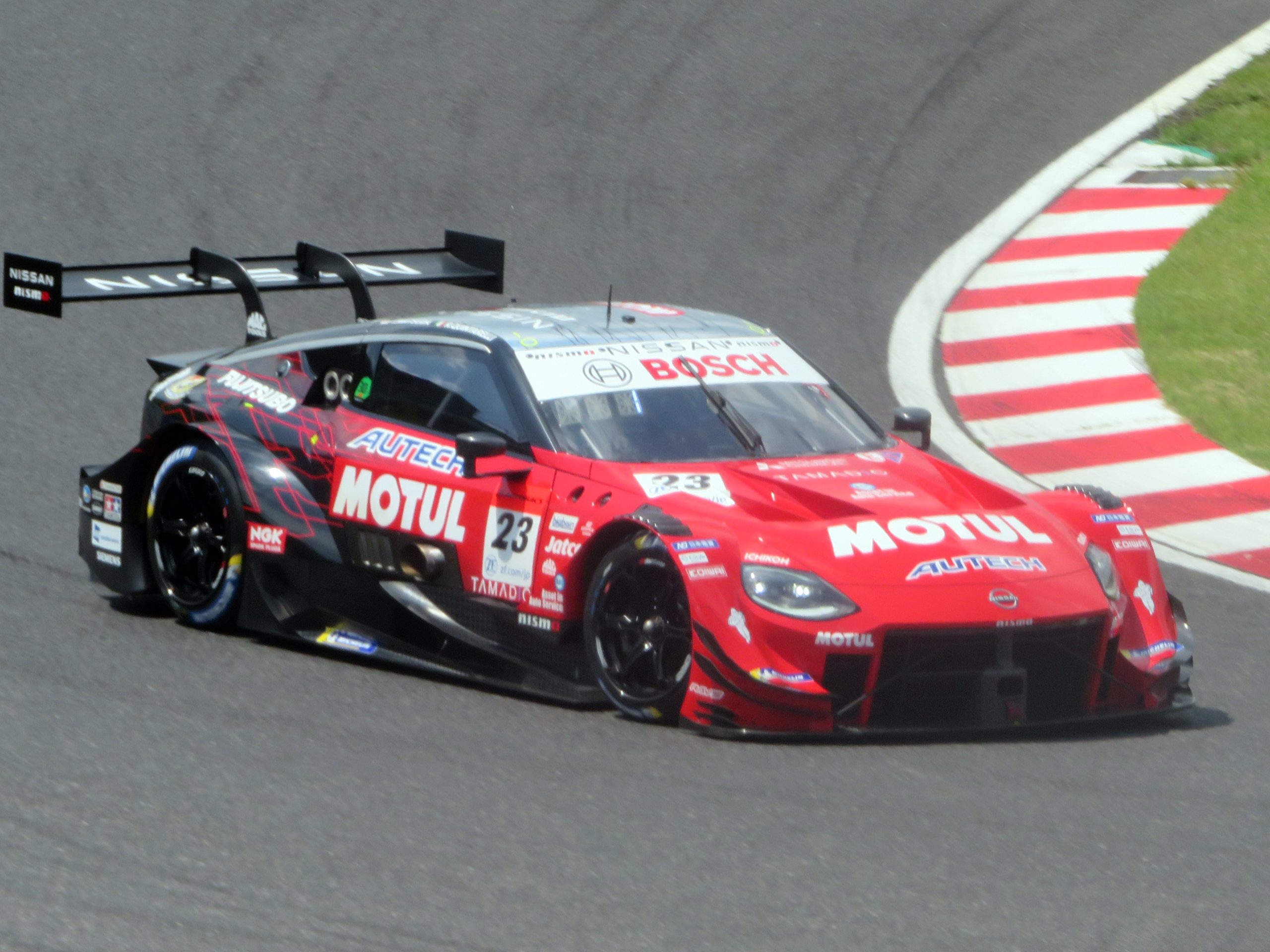
- Team NISMO's Z GT500
- Category: Super GT GT500
- Constructor: Nissan
- Predecessor: Nissan GT-R GT500

Technical specifications
- Chassis: Carbon-fibre and aluminium honeycomb monocoque
- Suspension (front): Double wishbone, pushrod operated, twin dampers and torsion bars
- Suspension (rear): Double wishbone, pushrod operated, twin dampers and spring
- Length: 4,725 mm (186 in)
- Width: 1,950 mm (77 in)
- Height: 1,150 mm (45 in)
- Engine: Nissan NR4S21/4/5/6 1,995 cc (122 cu in) inline-4 single-turbocharged Front mid-engine, rear-wheel drive
- Transmission: Hewland 6-speed + 1 reverse sequential semi-automatic gearbox with paddle shifters
- Power: 478 kW (641 hp; 650 PS)
- Weight: 1,030 kg (2,271 lb)
- Fuel: Various 102 RON
- Lubricants: Various
- Brakes: Hydraulic ventilated carbon disk and AP Racing calipers
- Tires: Bridgestone Potenza; Michelin Pilot Sport; Yokohama ADVAN (with Rays wheels)
- Clutch: ZF carbon 5.5 inch 4 plates

Competition history
- Notable entrants: (Japan) NISMO NDDP; (Japan) Team Impul; (Japan) NISMO; (Japan) Kondo Racing
- Notable drivers: (Italy) Ronnie Quintarelli; (Japan) Tsugio Matsuda; (Japan) Katsumasa Chiyo; (Japan) Mitsunori Takaboshi; (Belgium) Bertrand Baguette; (Japan) Kazuki Hiramine; (Japan) Kohei Hirate; (Japan) Daiki Sasaki
- Debut: 2022 Okayama GT 300km
Races	Wins	Poles
7	3	2

The Z GT500 was unveiled in December 2021, at Fuji Speedway, it was slated to compete in the 2022 Super GT season for the first time in 15 years, replacing the Nissan GT-R GT500, which had been in run for 13 seasons in the Super GT series. The Z GT500 made its racing debut at 2022 Super GT season's Okayama GT 300km round. The car scored its first podium finish in its debut race, as Team Nismo's #23 car, driven by Tsugio Matsuda, made an impressive late charge to climb up to the podium place despite starting 9th on the grid. In the third race of the season at Suzuka International Racing Course, the Z GT500 scored its first race win with team NDDP Racing, driven by Katsumasa Chiyo and Mitsunori Takaboshi, both drivers currently leading the championship with only one race to go. For their final race at Mobility Resort Motegi, the Calsonic Impul Z qualified third while NDDP Racing qualified fourth. On race day, the NDDP Z incurred a drive-through penalty early on so Chiyo and Takaboshi had to fight from 12th to ultimately finish 4th. NDDP Racing came in 2nd for the championship standings as Team Impul eclipsed them in the series ranking with a 2nd place finish during the final round. The #12 Calsonic Impul Z, driven by Kazuki Hiramine/Bertrand Baguette, was crowned champion for the 2022 season.

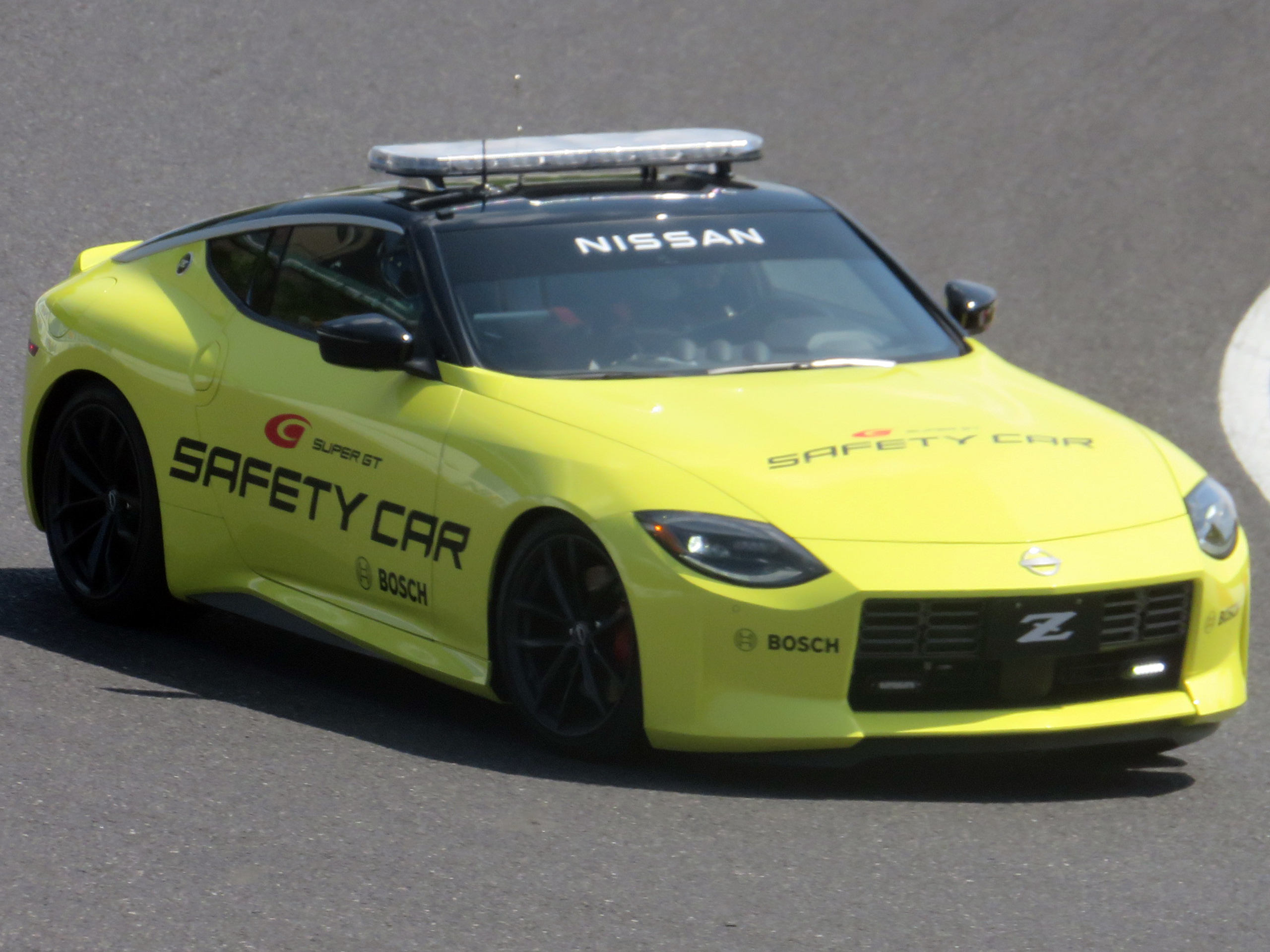
Z safety car used in 2022 Super GT Series

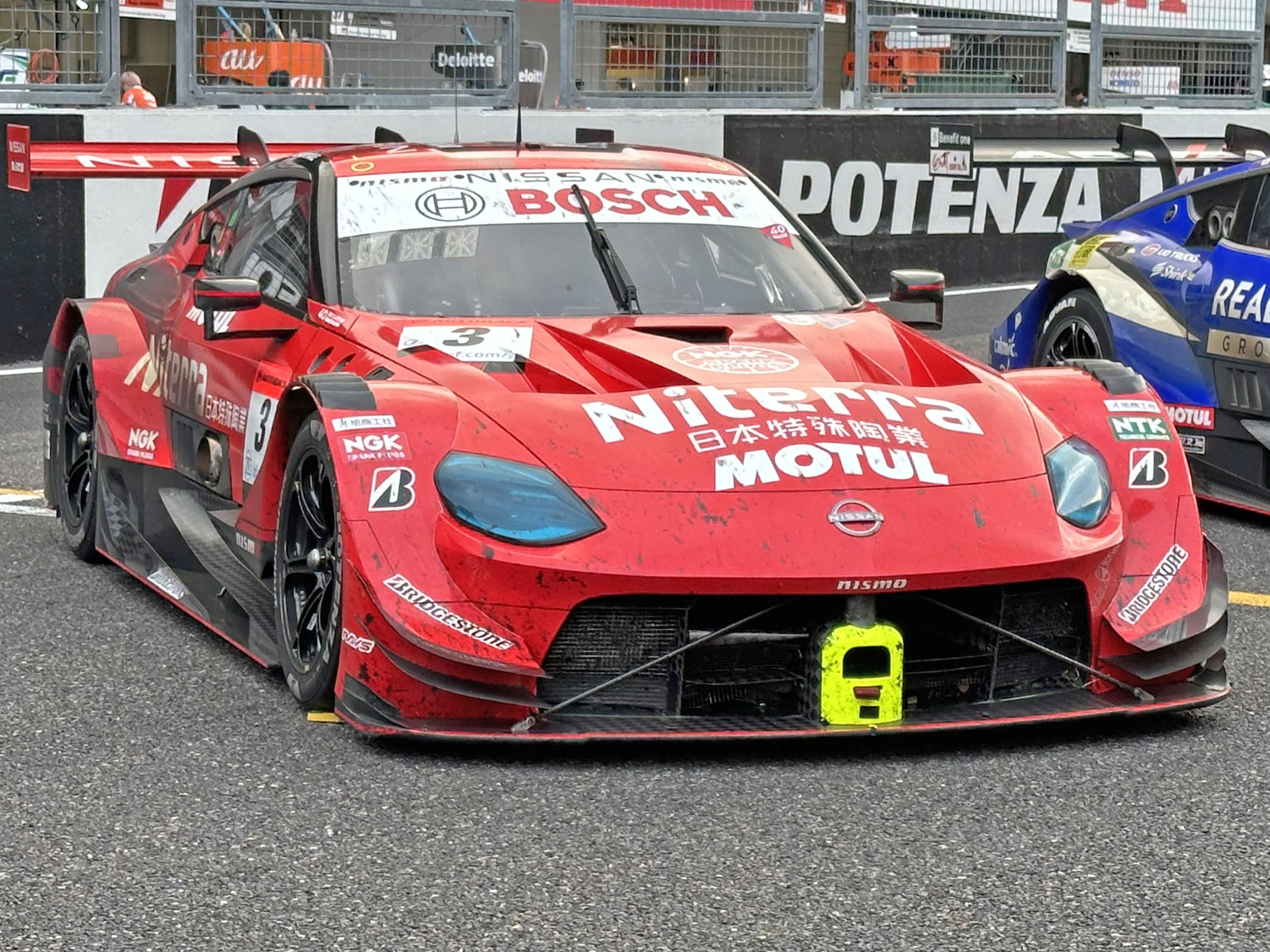
Nittera MOTUL Z (Nissan Z NISMO GT500, 2024)

=== Z Racing Concept ===
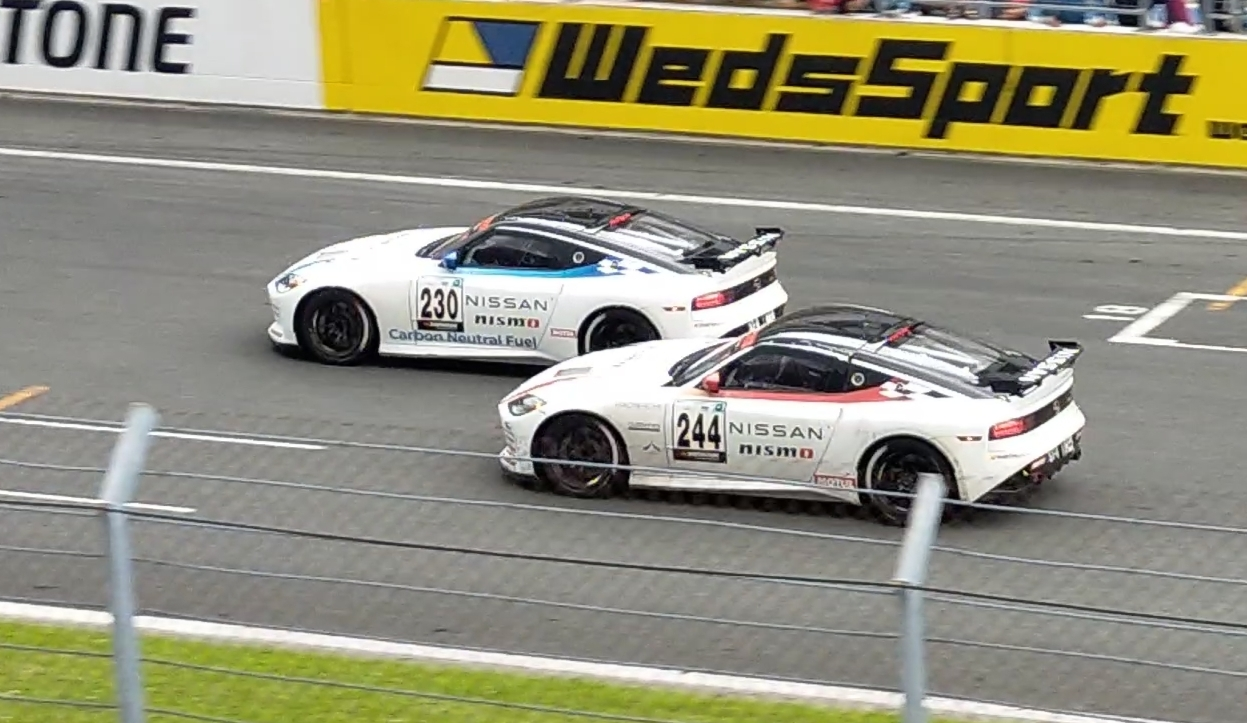
Z Racing Concepts being chequered flagged together at 2022 Super Taikyu Series, 24 hours of Fuji race

In June 2022, Nissan introduced the Z Racing Concept at 2022 Super Taikyu Series, 24 hours of Fuji round. Two of these racing concepts were entered the race, to aid development of Z's future racing programs and Nissan's carbon-neutral fuel (CNF) compatible engine. Both cars entered the race as non-championship contenders with numbers, 230 and 244. The car 230 was entered by team Nismo, equipped with a CNF compatible engine, the car 244 was entered by Max Racing, equipped with an internal combustion engine (ICE). Additionally, both cars were fitted with a different aero package, compared to the standard Z. Both cars, successfully finished the race.

=== SRO GT4 ===
==== Z Nismo GT4 ====
GT4 class version of the Z was introduced on September 28, 2022, via online platforms. It is the successor of the Z33 and Z34 models that competed in the earliest seasons of SRO's GT4 European series, and joins a long line of customer GT racecars built by Nissan, including the GT2 spec Z33 that raced in the FIA GT Championship and British GT with Team RJN and the GT1 and GT3 competitions with the Nissan GT-R. The Z GT4 was developed by Nissan's motorsport arm, Nismo. In results, some upgrades were done to the road going Z. Including; minor upgrades to the VR30DDTT engine, optimized chassis and suspension for competitive racing and track driving, an aerodynamic package; which includes, a front splitter with canards and GT4-inspired strut-supported rear wing. Other GT4 race car changes; such as the fire suppression system, weight reduction and safety equipment such as a roll cage were also fitted to the car.

Nissan claimed, this particular car was an evolution of the Z Racing Concept, which was used in the 2022 Super Taikyu Series, Fuji 24 hour race earlier in June, 2022. The Z GT4 is expected to compete in Michelin Pilot Challenge and GT4 America Series. The car would make its physical debut at the SEMA Auto Show in November, 2022 and deliveries to begin in the first half of 2023.

== Awards and recognition ==
Year	Award and Title
2021	Motor Magazine – Most Exciting New Car
2022	Australian Good Design Awards – Good Design Award
2023	Drive Car of The Year Awards – Best Sports Coupe

Motor Magazine named the Z as "Most Exciting New Car" of 2021, ahead of cars such as, Porsche Cayman GT4 RS and Toyota GR86. The Z won the Good Design Award under Product Design category at Australian Good Design Awards, the Award Jury praised Z's design, said "A clever and professional evolution of an icon", as the design of the Z pays homage for its predecessors, while also having a modern and fresh interpretation.

== Sales ==
Year	Japan	US	Canada	China
2022	408	263	4	
2023	1,027	1,771	407	17
2024		3,164	298	20
2025		5,487	556	17
