= Solenoid (disambiguation) =

A solenoid is a type of electromagnet formed by a coil of wire

Solenoid may also refer to:

- Solenoid (engineering), an actuator which uses an electromagnet to convert electrical energy to mechanical energy
  - Starter solenoid, part of an automobile ignition system; also called a starter relay
  - Transmission solenoid
- Solenoidal vector field, a vector field in mathematics characterized as having zero divergence
- Solenoid (DNA) in genetics
- Solenoid (mathematics)
- Solenoid (meteorology)
- Solenoid (novel), a 2015 novel by Mircea Cărtărescu
- Solenoid valve
- Solenoid protein domain
