= Infiniti G Line =

Infiniti G
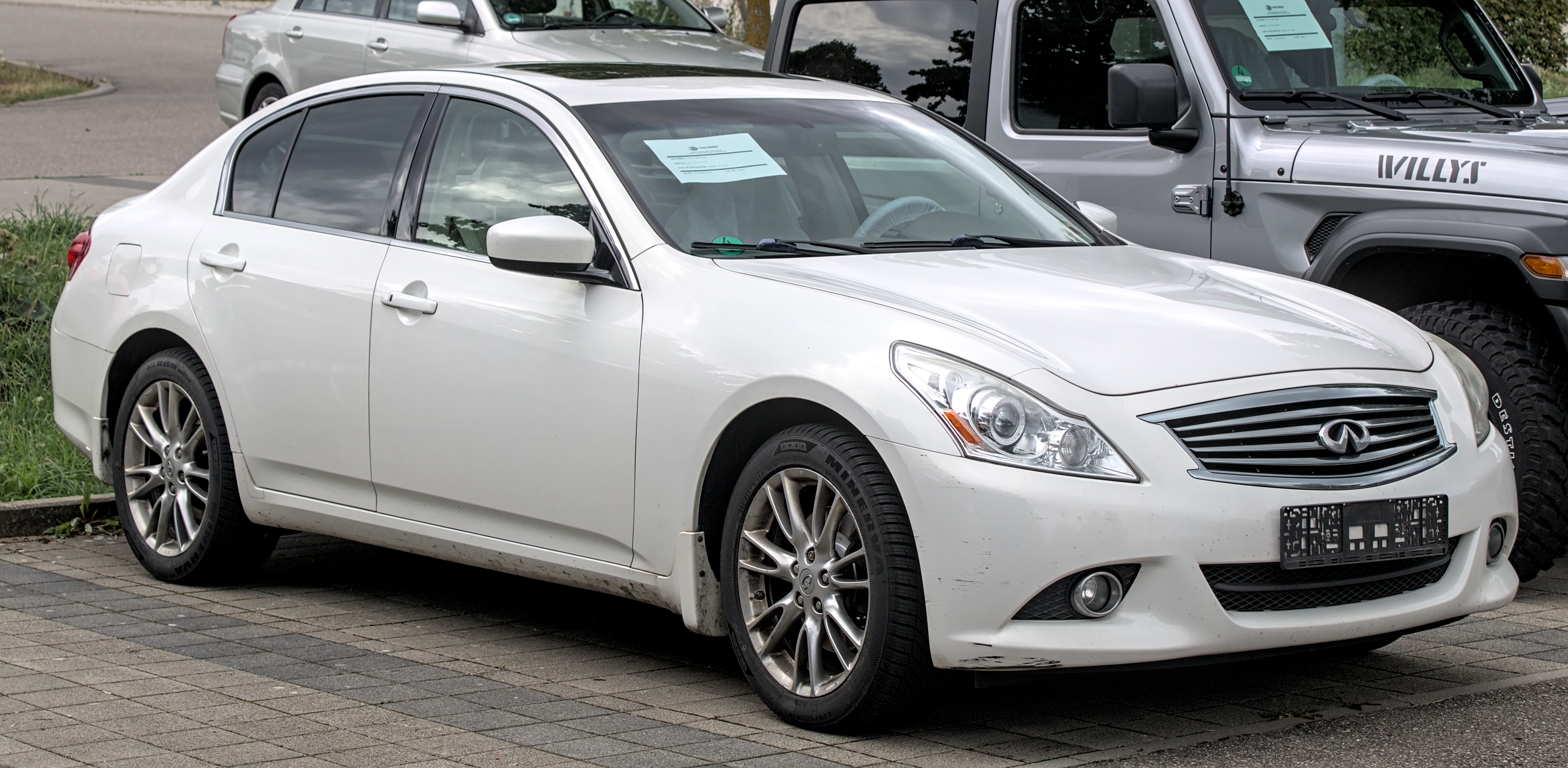
- 2012 Infiniti G37 (V36, Germany)

Overview
- Manufacturer: Nissan
- Also called: Nissan Primera (1990–1996, 1998–2002); Nissan Skyline (2002–2016); Infiniti Q40 (2015)
- Production: 1990–1996; 1998–2016

Body and chassis
- Class: Compact executive car
- Layout: Front-engine, front-wheel-drive (1990–1996, 1998–2002); Front mid-engine, rear-wheel-drive / all-wheel-drive (2002–2016)

Chronology
- Successor: Infiniti Q50 (sedan); Infiniti Q60 (V37) (coupé/convertible)

The Infiniti G Line is a series of compact executive cars manufactured and marketed by Infiniti, a luxury division of Nissan, for the 1991–1996 and 1999–2016 model years — across four generations.

The first two generations of the Infiniti G (P10 and P11) were sedans based on the Nissan Primera. Beginning with its third generation (V35), the Infiniti G have been rebadged versions of the Nissan Skyline line of sedans and coupes that were exported to the United States and Canada. The fourth generation (V36) introduced the hardtop coupe convertible. The Nissan FM platform, used with the third and fourth generations (V35 and V36) of the Infiniti G, also underpins the Nissan 370Z and has shared components with the Infiniti M, Infiniti EX, and Infiniti FX.

Infiniti established a new naming convention beginning with the 2014 model year; all passenger cars are designated by the letter "Q," while sport-utility model names begin with "QX." The Infiniti G was to have been replaced by the Infiniti Q50, but the G37 was revived as the Q40 beginning with the 2015 model year.

== First generation (P10; 1990) ==
G20 (P10)
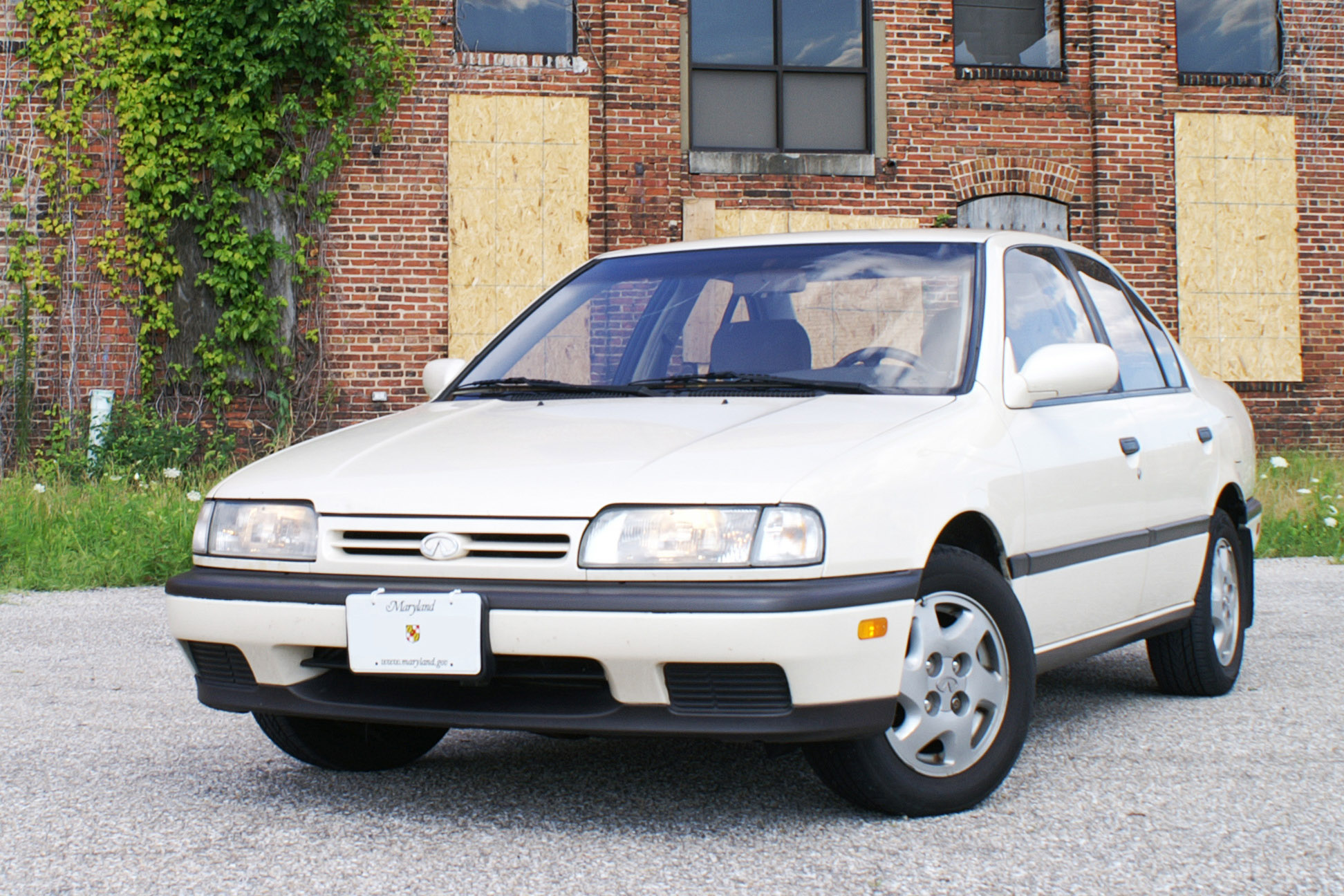

Overview
- Also called: Nissan Primera
- Production: July 10, 1990–July 19, 1996
- Model years: 1991-1996
- Assembly: Japan: Yokosuka
- Designer: Mamoru Aoki (1987)

Body and chassis
- Body style: 4-door sedan
- Layout: FF layout

Powertrain
- Engine: Gasoline: 2.0L SR20DE I4 140 hp (104 kW)

Dimensions
- Wheelbase: 100.4 in (2,550 mm)
- Length: 1993.5: 174.8 in (4,440 mm); 1990-93 & 1994-96: 175 in (4,400 mm)
- Width: 66.7 in (1,690 mm)
- Height: 1993.5: 54.7 in (1,390 mm); 1990-93: 54.9 in (1,390 mm); 1994-96: 53.5 in (1,360 mm)
- Curb weight: 2,535 to 2,818 lb (1,150 to 1,278 kg)

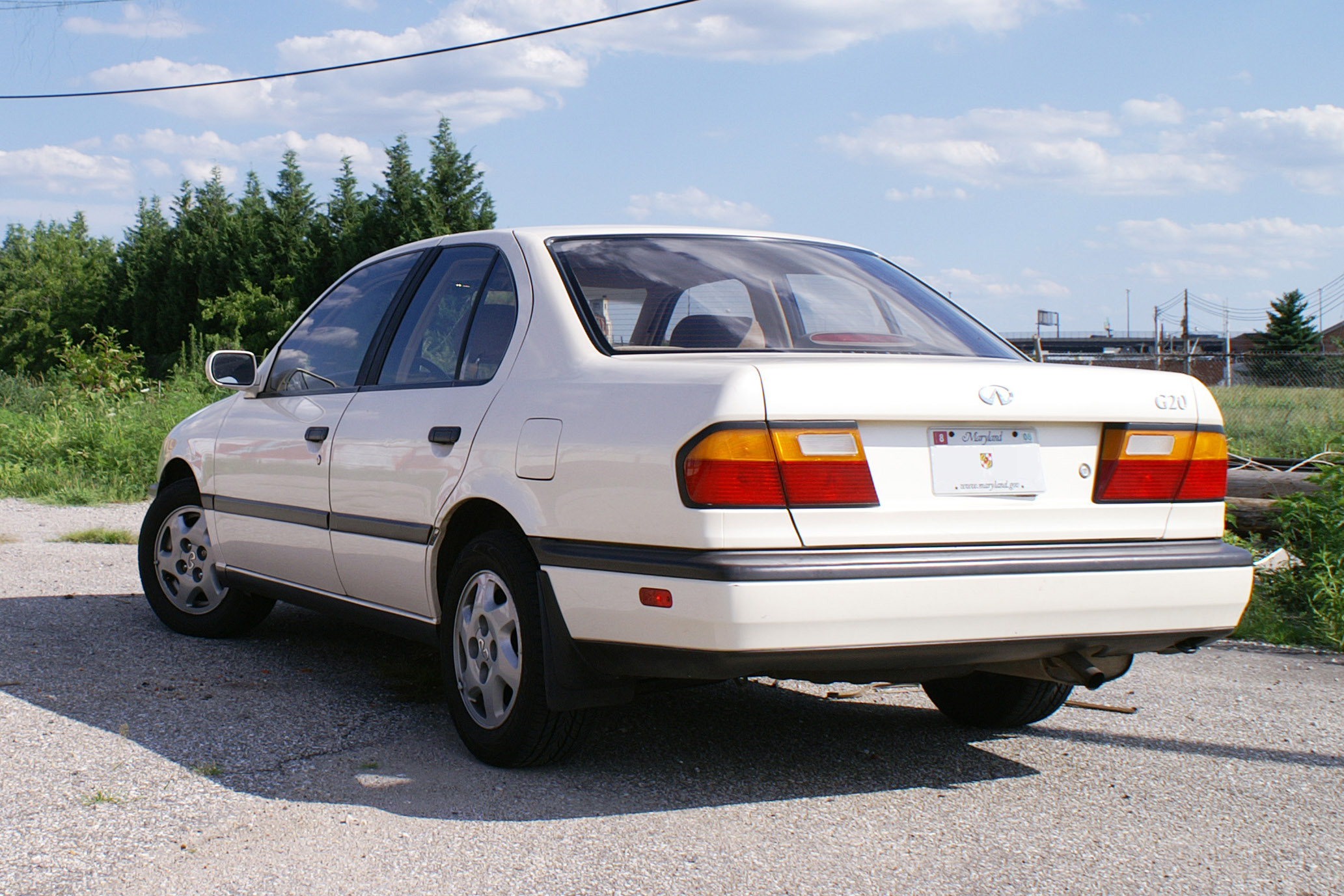
1991–1993 G20

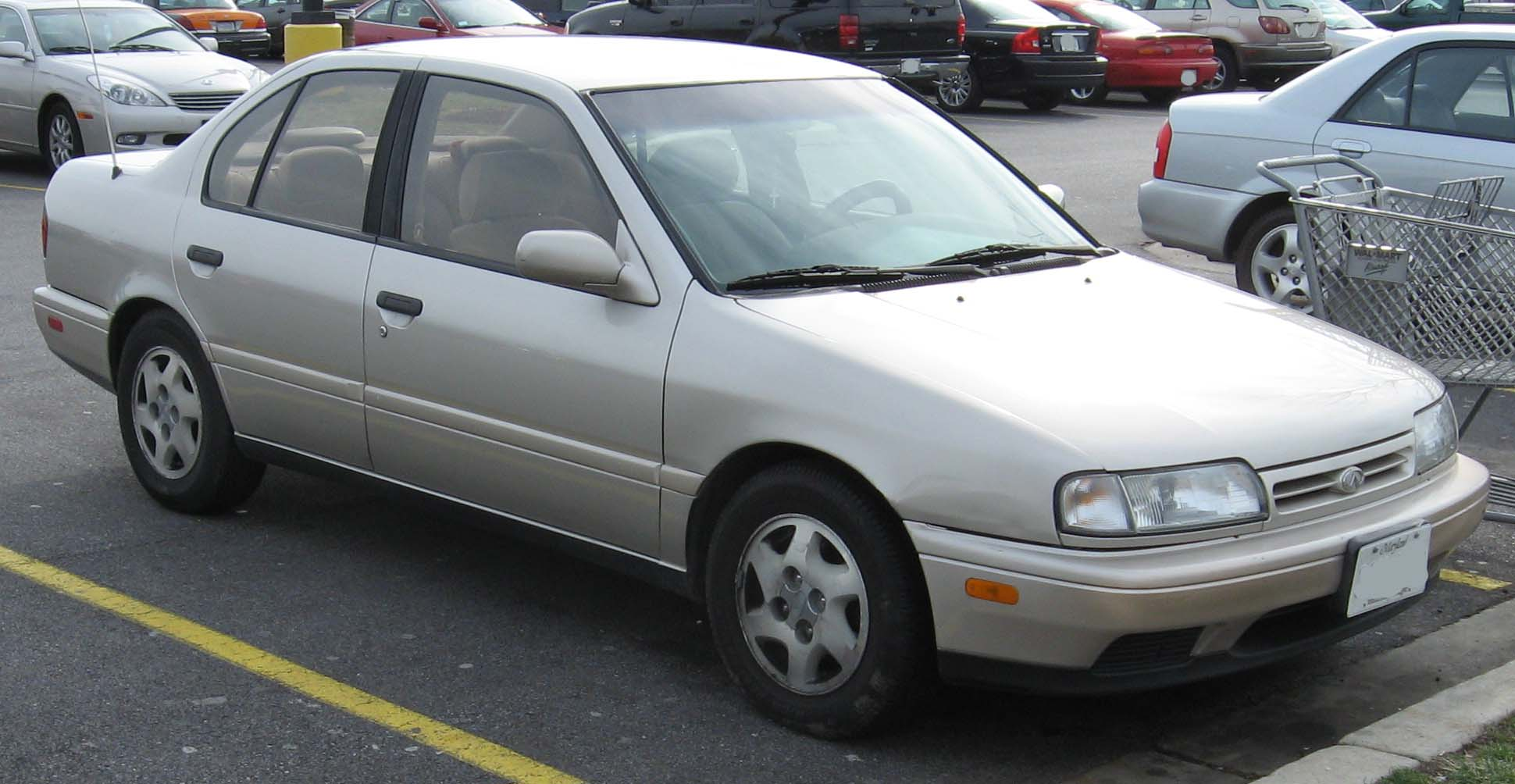
1993.5 G20

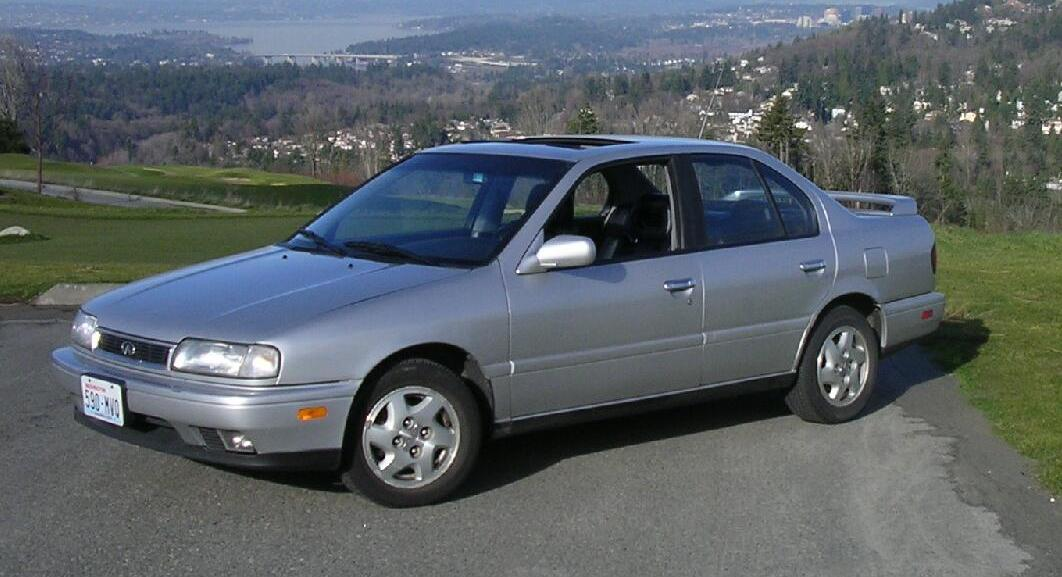
1994–1996 G20t

The Infiniti G20 was Infiniti's entry-level luxury car in the United States from 1990 to 2002, with a two-year hiatus for model years 1997 and 1998, in which the Infiniti I30 became their entry-level car. It was a rebadged version of the Nissan Primera sedan, primarily designed for the European market, and was the result of Nissan's Project 901 initiative. It was launched in September 1990 as Infiniti's first small car as an entry-level alternative to the Q45; later advertisements in 1998 for the second-generation G20 emphasized its European heritage with the tag line "Born in Japan. Educated in Europe. Now Available in America." Two generations of the G20 exist in the United States, the HP10 (P10), built from 1990 to 1996, and the HP11 (P11), built from 1998 to 2002. All G20s were front-wheel drive and were built in Oppama, Japan. The exterior and interior designs of the P10 were styled by Mamoru Aoki in 1987.

The G20 was first unveiled to Infiniti dealers at the 1989 New York International Auto Show (appearing to the public at the 1990 show), with the first series production example being assembled on July 10, 1990. The final 1996 G20 was rolled off the assembly line on July 19, 1996. The P10 featured the first application of Nissan's multi-link front suspension in a front-wheel-drive car, with an independent MacPherson strut setup in the rear. It came standard with a 5-speed manual transmission. The only options to begin with were an automatic transmission, leather interior, and a power glass moonroof; a Touring package (labeled G20t) was introduced in 1994 and featured a black leather interior with sport front bucket seats and fold-down rear seats, as well as a limited-slip differential in the transmission and a spoiler on the rear decklid. In Canada, the limited-slip differential was standard with all manual transmission equipped cars from 1990 onwards, with no "t" distinction until the American model started with the model suffix.

=== Engine design ===
The G20 was powered by the SR20DE Inline 4-cylinder. It was a transversely-mounted dual overhead cam naturally aspirated reciprocating internal combustion engine. Displacement was 2.0 L (1,998 cc) with a square bore × stroke ratio of 86 mm × 86 mm (3.39 in × 3.39 in). This engine was also shared with the US-spec Nissan Sentra/Nissan 200SX SE-R, Nissan NX2000, and a host of non-US Nissan vehicles. The particular version used in the G20 produced 140 hp (104 kW) crank in the US and 132 or 136 lb⋅ft (179 or 184 N⋅m) of torque. These engines were also fairly high-revving for the time, with a redline of 7500 rpm.

There were three major variants of the SR20DE used in the G20. The first, used from July 1990 to December 1993, was the highport, in which the injectors and fuel rail were located above the intake plenum. In January 1994, due to tightening emissions restrictions, Nissan switched to a lowport design, in which the injectors and fuel rail switched places with the intake plenum. This design also featured a milder intake camshaft. (Switching it out for the highport intake cam is a popular upgrade to gain more power.) This design was used from 1994 to 1996 and again in 1998. In 1999 Nissan replaced the valvetrain with a roller-rocker arm lifter design in place of the hydraulic rocker arm previously used, but kept the lowport intake design; many performance parts are not interchangeable between roller-rocker and highport/lowport engines, most notably camshafts.

=== Transmission ===
The G20 featured either a 5-speed manual transmission or an optional 4-speed automatic. Most front-wheel-drive transmissions from other SR-powered cars can be used with few modifications. The stock transmission as well as other SR20 transmissions are often upgraded with various modifications in order to handle more power. Common manual transmission modifications include cryo treating, shot peening, transmission case welding, aftermarket limited-slip differential, aftermarket axles, and upgraded clutches. Common automatic transmission modifications include built valve bodies, aftermarket torque converters, automatic transmission fluid (ATF) coolers, additional ATF filters, and aftermarket TCUs. Higher-rated transmission swaps from front-wheel-drive VQ or QR25DE powered cars such as the 2002–2006 Nissan Sentra SE-R Spec-V have also been performed.

=== Equipment ===
The G20 was a badge-engineered version of the Nissan Primera, but because Infiniti was pitched as a premium brand, it featured a high level of equipment compared to its European and Japanese relatives. The only engine available was the 2.0 litre SR20DE Inline 4-cylinder; in Europe this was the top-of-the-line engine for the Primera lineup. 5-speed manual and 4-speed automatic transmissions were both available, with the 5-speed being praised as "one of the best in the business." Power windows, power locks, power mirrors, air conditioning, four-wheel disc brakes with ABS, alloy wheels, a Bose stereo, a theft-deterrent system, cruise control, floor mats, and a leather-wrapped steering wheel and gearshift knob were all standard. Heated mirrors, leather seats and a power moonroof were common options, and were later offered in a package that included power seats and keyless entry. Later models also featured dual front airbags. The standard trim was called Luxury. Two major trim package upgrades were offered: Touring, badged G20t, available from model years 1994 to 1996 and 1999 to 2001, and Sport (with no badge modification) which was offered during model year 2002. These packages featured a limited-slip differential in the transmission, sportier, more highly bolstered front bucket seats and fold-down rear seats, all-black leather interior, fog lamps, and a spoiler on the rear decklid. The details of these trims varied from year to year.

=== P10 model refresh changes ===
Introduced at the 1993 New York Auto Show, the main changes for the P10 came as a midyear refresh in April 1993 (model year 1993.5), when dual airbags replaced motorized seatbelts, leather interiors came standard with power front seats, matte-black side moldings were replaced by body-colored ones, the refrigerant was converted from R12 to R134a, the audio system was upgraded to six speakers with a CD player instead of the previously standard cassette deck, and other new options such as remote keyless entry were added. In February 1994, the 1994 model year was given a new larger chrome-plated grille and door handles, a lowport engine (replacing the original highport SR20DE, in which the intake plenum is below the fuel injectors and fuel rail), a change in the vehicle's self-diagnostic system to OBD-II, and larger 195/65R14 tires. The Touring models, introduced in February 1994, featured a limited-slip differential in the transmission; 195/65R14 Yokohama tires, sportier, more highly bolstered black leather front bucket seats and fold-down rear seats; fog lights; and a spoiler on the rear decklid.

The G20 was temporarily discontinued after the 1996 model year, leaving the I30 as Infiniti's lowest-priced car for the 1997 & 1998 model years.

== Second generation (P11; 1998) ==
G20 (P11)
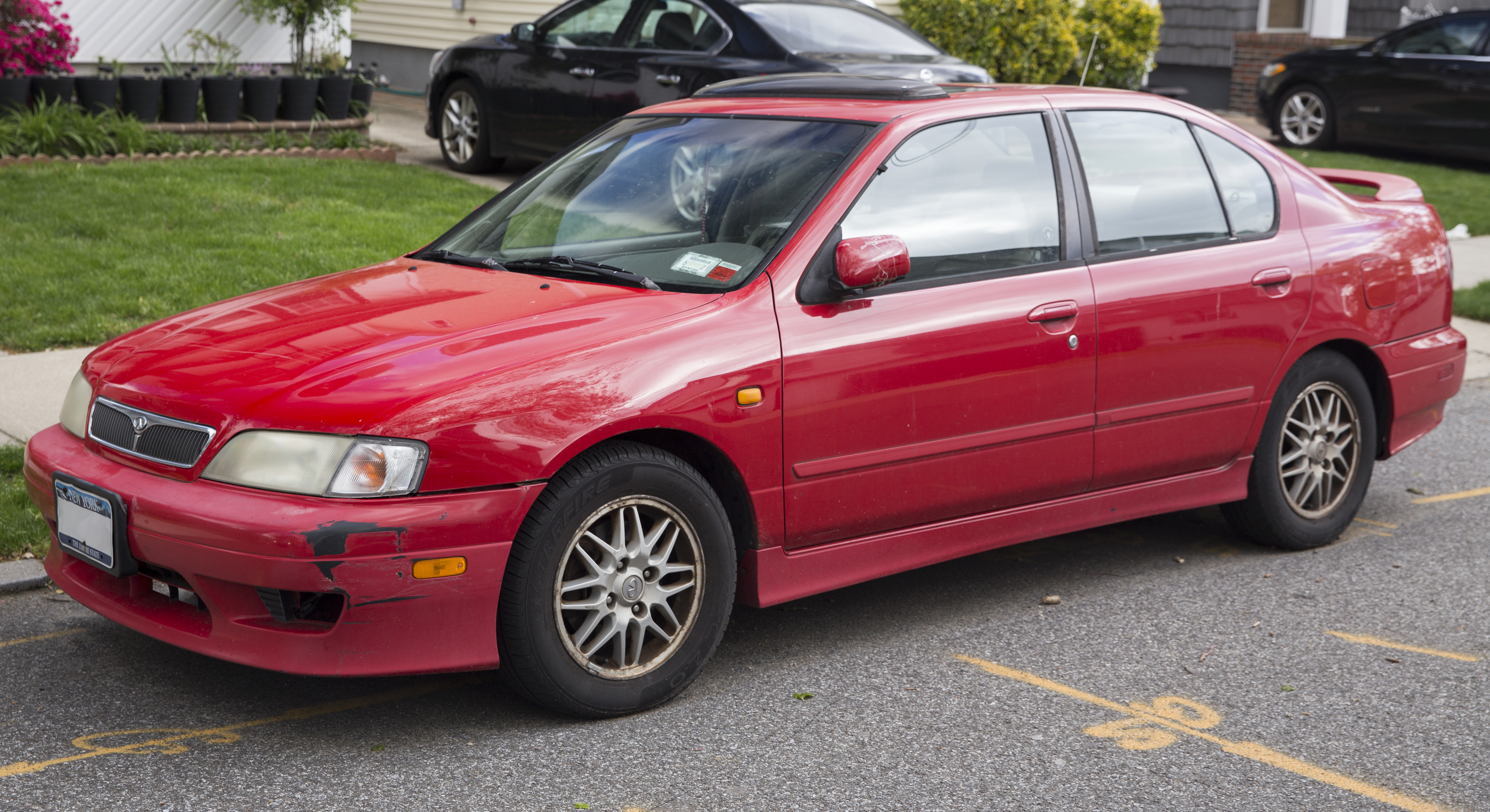

Overview
- Also called: Nissan Primera; Nissan Primera Camino
- Production: 1998–2002
- Model years: 1999–2002
- Assembly: Japan: Yokosuka

Body and chassis
- Body style: 4-door sedan
- Layout: FF layout

Powertrain
- Engine: Gasoline: 2.0L SR20DE I4 140 hp (104 kW) (1998–1999); 2.0L SR20DE I4 145 hp (108 kW) (1999–2002)

Dimensions
- Wheelbase: 102.4 in (2,600 mm)
- Length: 177.5 in (4,510 mm)
- Width: 66.7 in (1,690 mm)
- Height: 55.1 in (1,400 mm)
- Curb weight: 2,913 to 2,981 lb (1,321 to 1,352 kg)

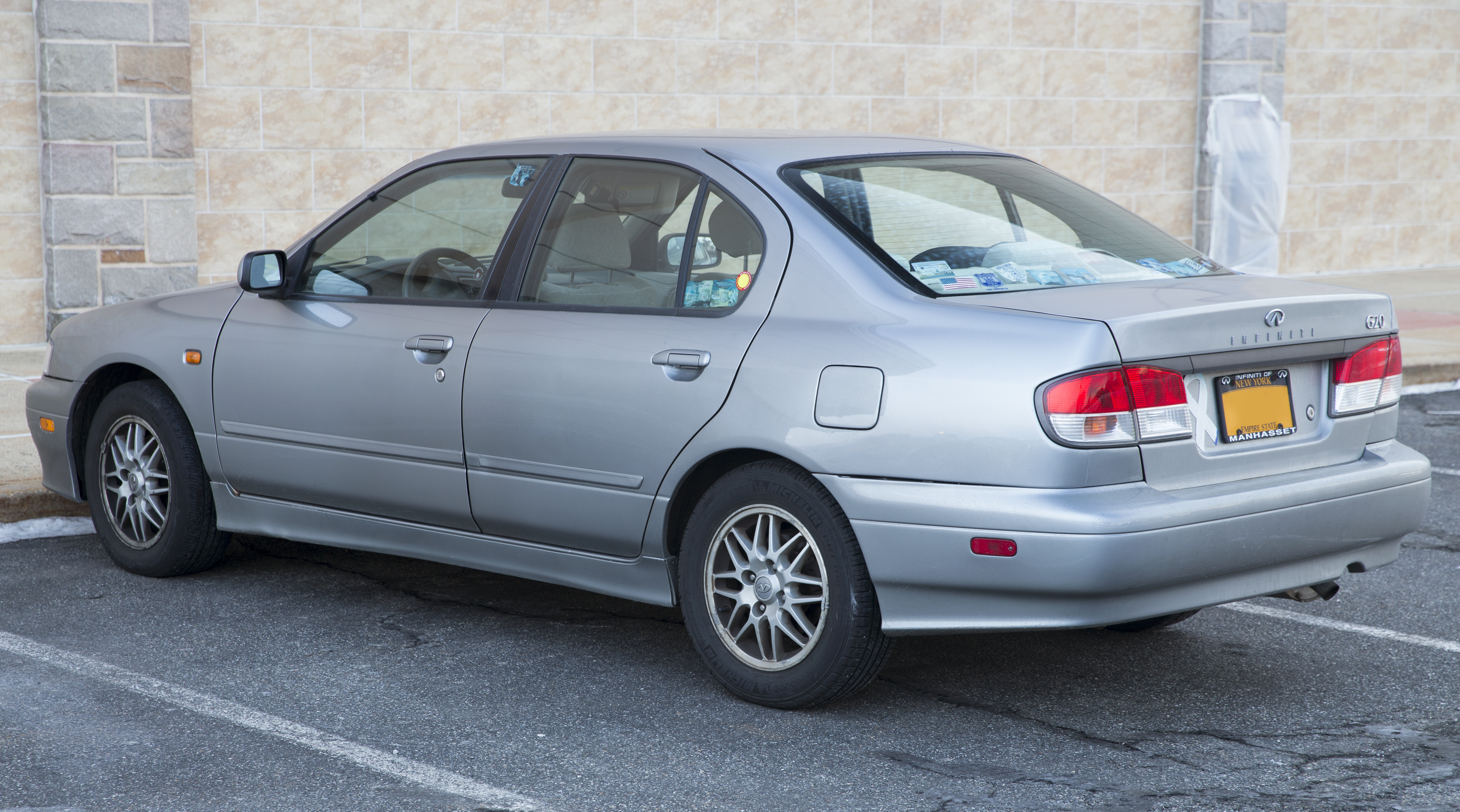
1999 Infiniti G20

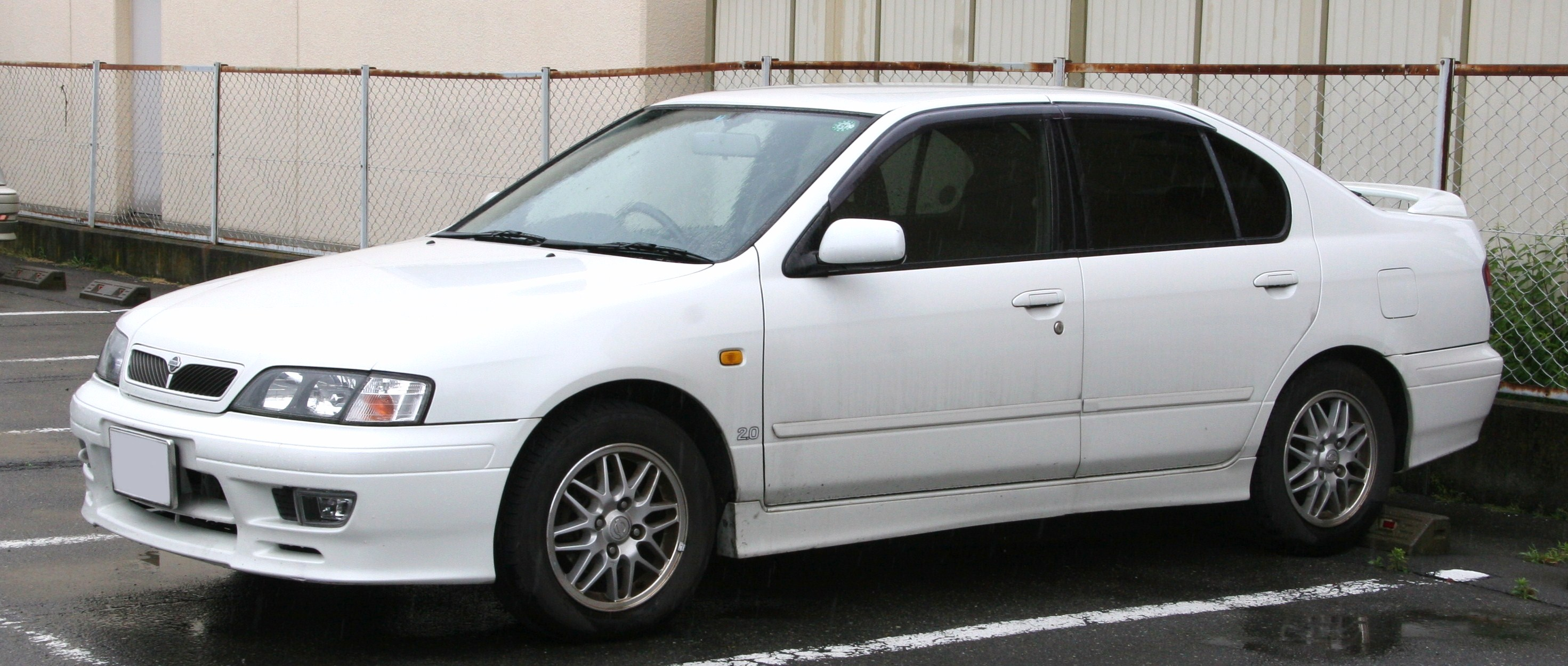
Nissan Primera Camino, the Japanese equivalent of the Infiniti G20

The second-generation G20 underwent several changes, including adopting the multi-link beam rear suspension very similar to the 1995–1999 Nissan Maxima with continued use of the independent multi-link strut front suspension of the P10 (similar to the 300ZX and Skyline GT-R). Despite enthusiasts' aversion to the beam, several publications praised the updated G20, as a technically good method of avoiding lateral suspension movement (which would compromise handling) while still offering a compliant ride. The P11 has a lateral grip figure of between 0.80 and 0.94g and a 61% front/39% rear weight distribution. It grew in size, with a 2.7-inch (69 mm) length increase and 0.4-inch (10 mm) height increase over the P10, resulting in 1.4 inches (36 mm) more legroom for rear-seat passengers. The new model's increased size and luxury options, however, added to the car's weight (which rose to 3000 pounds); the stock 140-145 horsepower engine provided lower performance (the MY1999 automatic, for example, had a 10.9-second 0-60 mph time and did the quarter-mile in 18.4 seconds at 77 mph (124 km/h).

The first example of the second-generation G20 rolled off the Oppama assembly line on May 18, 1998, going on sale in July 1998 as a 1999 model. The final second-generation 2002 G20 was assembled on January 11, 2002, and the G20 slowly phased out during the first quarter of 2002, in being replaced by the 2003 model year rear-wheel drive G35 sports sedan. All models featured a higher level of standard equipment than the P10, including automatic climate control on all but cloth-seat Luxury models, 15" 16-spoke alloy wheels, a higher-quality double-DIN Bose radio/CD/cassette player standard, keyless entry, standard power moonroof on all but cloth seat luxury models, and later, side-impact airbags. The Touring models continued to feature a limited-slip differential, but also had unique 12-spoke alloy wheels, and the upgraded sports seats were now available in beige leather and "sport cloth" (the latter as a factory-order option) in addition to the previously offered black leather.

=== P11 model refresh changes ===
In late 1999, several noteworthy changes for the P11 came as a refresh in the 2000 model year, when the 145-crank horsepower roller rocker-variant of the SR20DE engine was implemented, newer automatic and manual transmission variations were introduced, anti-theft immobilizer circuitry was added, anti-glare side mirrors became standard, and a remote trunk release was added to the keyless entry fob. In 2001, the G20t was dropped and a Sport model was introduced. In addition to the prior G20t's limited-slip differential and decklid spoiler, this model featured two-tone leather/suede sport seats, 16-inch wheels, and a variety of minor cosmetic modifications. The 2002 base G20 received the 12-spoke Touring alloy wheels as standard equipment.

=== End of production ===
The G20 was discontinued in favor of the rear wheel drive Infiniti G35, a badge engineered export version of the JDM V35 Nissan Skyline which was introduced in Japan in 2001. The G35 received significant praise from the automotive press and became a sales success for Infiniti despite being priced approximately US$7,000 above the G20's average MSRP of $23,000. The G35, significantly larger and more powerful than the G20, was aimed more at the entry level premium-sports sedan market instead of the G20's premium-sport compact market. The Nissan Primera was continued outside the United States in a lightly restyled model, followed by the all-new P12 Primera with a final end of production in 2006 as a 2007 model.

== Third generation (V35; 2002) ==
G35 (V35)
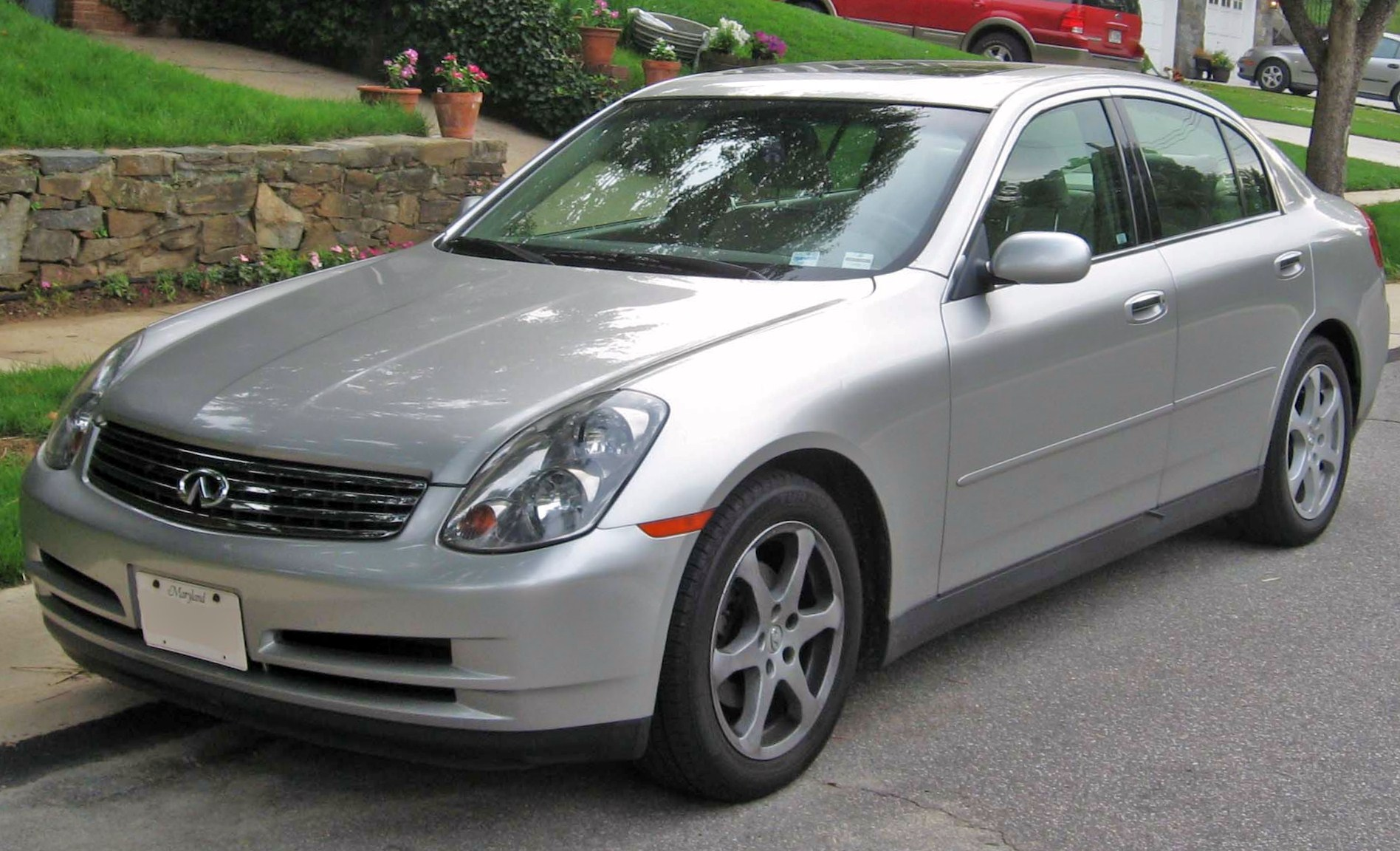

Overview
- Also called: Nissan Skyline
- Production: January 2002–August 2006 (sedan); June 2002–May 2007 (coupe)
- Model years: 2003–2006 (sedan); 2003–2007 (coupe)
- Assembly: Japan: Kaminokawa, Tochigi
- Designer: Hiroshi Hasegawa (sedan: 1998, coupé: 2000)

Body and chassis
- Body style: 4-door sedan 2-door coupe
- Layout: Front mid-engine, rear-wheel-drive / all-wheel-drive
- Platform: Nissan FM platform
- Related: Infiniti FX; Infiniti M Nissan 350Z; Nissan Stagea

Powertrain
- Engine: Gasoline: 3.5 L (3,498 cc) VQ35DE V6
- Power output: 194 kW (260 hp; 264 PS) (2003–2004 sedan); 210 kW (282 hp; 286 PS) (2003–2004 coupe); 222 kW (298 hp; 302 PS) (6MT only, 2005–2006 sedans, 2005–2007 coupés)
- Transmission: 5-speed RE5R05A JATCO automatic 6-speed manual

Dimensions
- Wheelbase: 2,850 mm (112.2 in)
- Length: 4,630 mm (182.3 in) (coupe); 4,735 mm (186.4 in) (sedan)
- Width: 1,815 mm (71.5 in) (coupe); 1,750 mm (68.9 in) (sedan)
- Height: 1,390 mm (54.7 in) (coupe); 1,465 mm (57.7 in) (sedan)
- Curb weight: 3,373 lb (1,530 kg) (coupe 6MT); 3,395 lb (1,540 kg) (coupe 5AT); 3,395 lb (1,540 kg) (sedan 5AT); 3,351 lb (1,520 kg) (sedan 6MT)

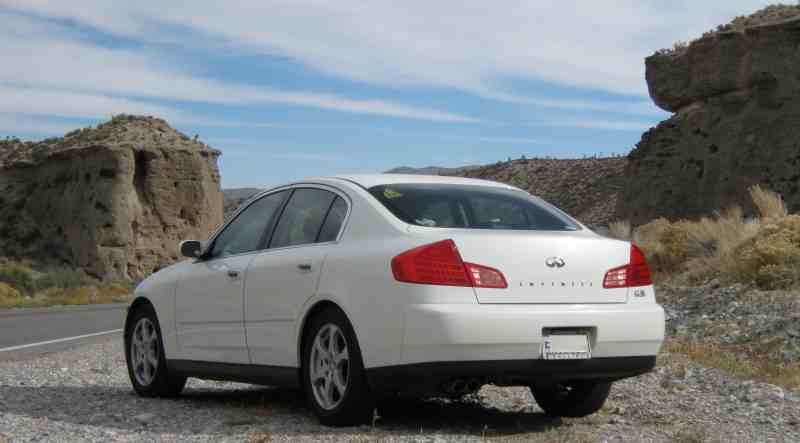
Infiniti G35 sedan

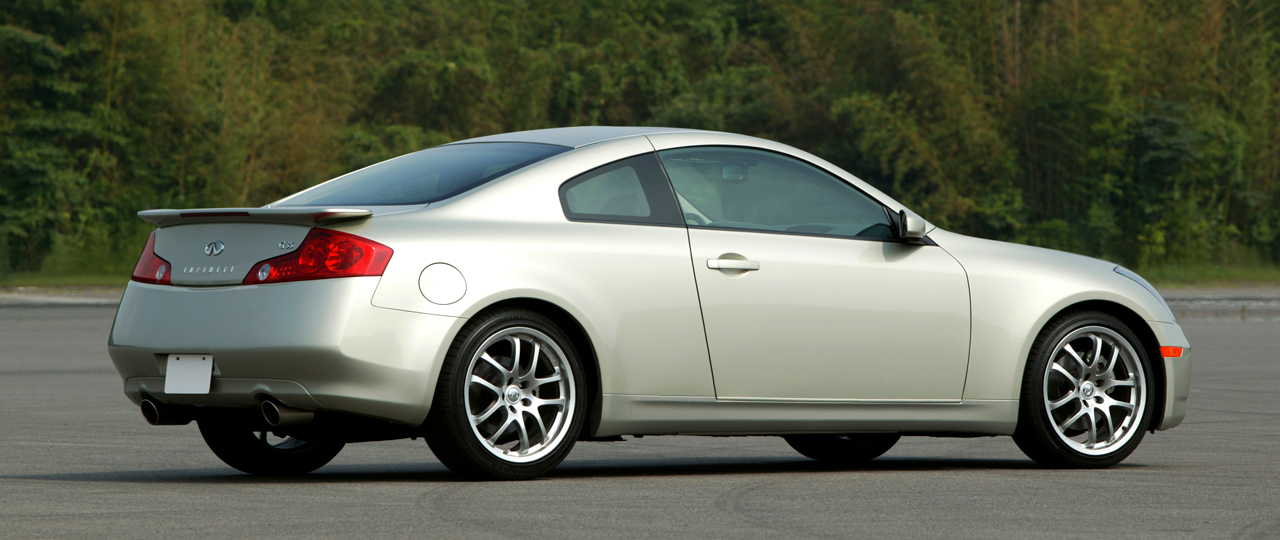
Infiniti G35 coupe

The third generation G (V35) was unveiled in June 2001 and released to North America for the 2003 model year, as the G35 on March 12, 2002. It had little in common with the Infiniti G20, shifting from the FWD Primera platform to the RWD Skyline platform. The G35 continued in the same tradition as the original Infiniti M and the J30, which were also RWD models utilizing the same drivetrain as contemporary Nissan Zs. Hiroshi Hasegawa designed both the sedan (frozen in 1998) and coupé (finalized in late 2000), with the former being previewed as the Nissan XVL Concept sports sedan in October 1999 at the Tokyo Motor Show and Infiniti XVL Concept in January 2000 at the NAIAS. Over 6 months prior to the Nissan XVL Concept introduction, in early April 1999 at the 1999 New York International Auto Show, Infiniti showcased a prototype of the V35 to journalists as part of an early preview of various other 2001 and 2002 model year Infiniti vehicles. The G35 was assembled in Kaminokawa, Tochigi, Japan, and the first G35 was built in January 2002 as a 2003 model.

=== G35 ===
The G35 was based on the Nissan FM platform shared with the Nissan 350Z sports car and Infiniti FX crossover SUV. The FM platform stands for "front midship" design where the engine is moved back towards the rear of the engine bay which in turn improves the weight distribution. The G35 was Motor Trend's Car of the Year for 2003. The G35 was also nominated for the North American Car of the Year award that year and was on the Car and Driver Ten Best list for 2003 and 2004.

Using the VQ35DE engine, the Infiniti G35 uses a front-midship engine, rear-wheel drive layout (all-wheel drive is available for the G35x sedan) to achieve a 52% front/48% rear weight distribution. Both body styles are available with either a 5-speed automatic (JATCO RE5R05A) Tiptronic or 6-speed manual transmission, although the automatic is the only transmission available for the AWD sedan.

The earliest (calendar year 2002) North American G35s were all sedans, sold in two trim levels, Base and Leather. Base models had cloth seat upholstery and 16" wheels, while Leather models had leather seat upholstery and 17" six spoke wheels. Leather trimline cars could also have an optional Premium package that included a Bose sound system; stand-alone options such as Xenon High Intensity Discharge (HID) headlights, moonroof, and an Aero package with 5-spoke wheels were offered as well. Early G35 sedans featured a separate vertical panel on the rear face of the trunk with the electric trunk release switch and closely spaced "INFINITI" lettering. Early G35 sedans was the use of an engine-driven viscous clutch fan for engine cooling. The first "refresh" of the G35 sedan (Nov/Dec 2002) replaced the engine-driven cooling fan with all-electric fans, and the trunk featured a smoother style with larger and more widely spaced "INFINITI" lettering. The trunk release button moved to the finisher panel below the left rear taillight assembly.

A 6-speed manual transmission became available in 2003 on the sedan (optional on the coupe since production). For the 2003–2004 model years, the V6 produced 194 kW (264 PS; 260 hp) and 353 N⋅m (260 lb⋅ft) of torque in the sedan, 209 kW (284 PS; 280 hp) and 366 N⋅m (270 lb⋅ft) in the coupe. In the 2005 and 2006 model years (sedan, 2005–2007 for the coupe), those with automatic transmissions (both sedan and coupe) produced 209 kW (284 PS; 280 hp) and 366 N⋅m (270 lb⋅ft) of torque, while those with manual transmissions produced 222 kW (302 PS; 298 hp) and 350 N⋅m (258 lb⋅ft) of torque (again, both in sedan and coupe form). There is speculation that the output did not actually change, and that Infiniti was simply taking advantage of the outdated SAE standard of rating horsepower. However, manual transmission cars built from 2005 to 2006 (as well as 2007 coupes equipped with the manual) did receive the so-called 'rev-up' version of the VQ35, which featured variable valve timing on the exhaust side in addition to the intake side VVT already present.

The AWD model of the G35 sedan is called the G35x. Although the automatic transmission for the G35x is manufactured by Aisin-Warner, the AWD technology uses Nissan's proprietary ATTESA E-TS AWD system. The system will make the car 100% rear wheel drive when driving at a steady speed. When the driver uses the throttle to accelerate from a stop or constant speed, the AWD system can send up to 50% of torque to the front wheels. When the car's speed becomes steady again, the drivetrain returns the torque to the rear wheels. The AWD system will also transfer torque to the front wheels if the system detects loss of traction. This technology was first used in the 1989 Nissan Skyline GT-R, and has since been used in subsequent Skylines, and other vehicles in Japan and overseas, including the Nissan Bluebird, and Nissan Stagea. There are few differences between the 2003 & 2004 G35 coupes. Both '03 & '04 six-speed manual models had the sport option which included Brembo brakes and the Performance Tire and Wheel Package. On the 2005 coupes, three new colors, 'Athens Blue', 'Lakeshore Slate', and 'Serengeti Sand', replaced 'Twilight Blue', 'Caribbean Blue', and 'Desert Platinum' respectively; also, the Willow Cloth interior option was removed, and Stone leather became available.

The Infiniti G35 was successfully campaigned in drifting by Team Falken. In the United States, Calvin Wan's twin-turbo G35 won him numerous Formula DRIFT accolades during its 2004–2007 life cycle, while in Europe, Paul Cheshire competed at many events for Team Falken with his heavily modified 2JZ-GTE powered V35, notably at the Nürburgring Circuit in Germany.

=== 2005 and 2006 refreshes ===
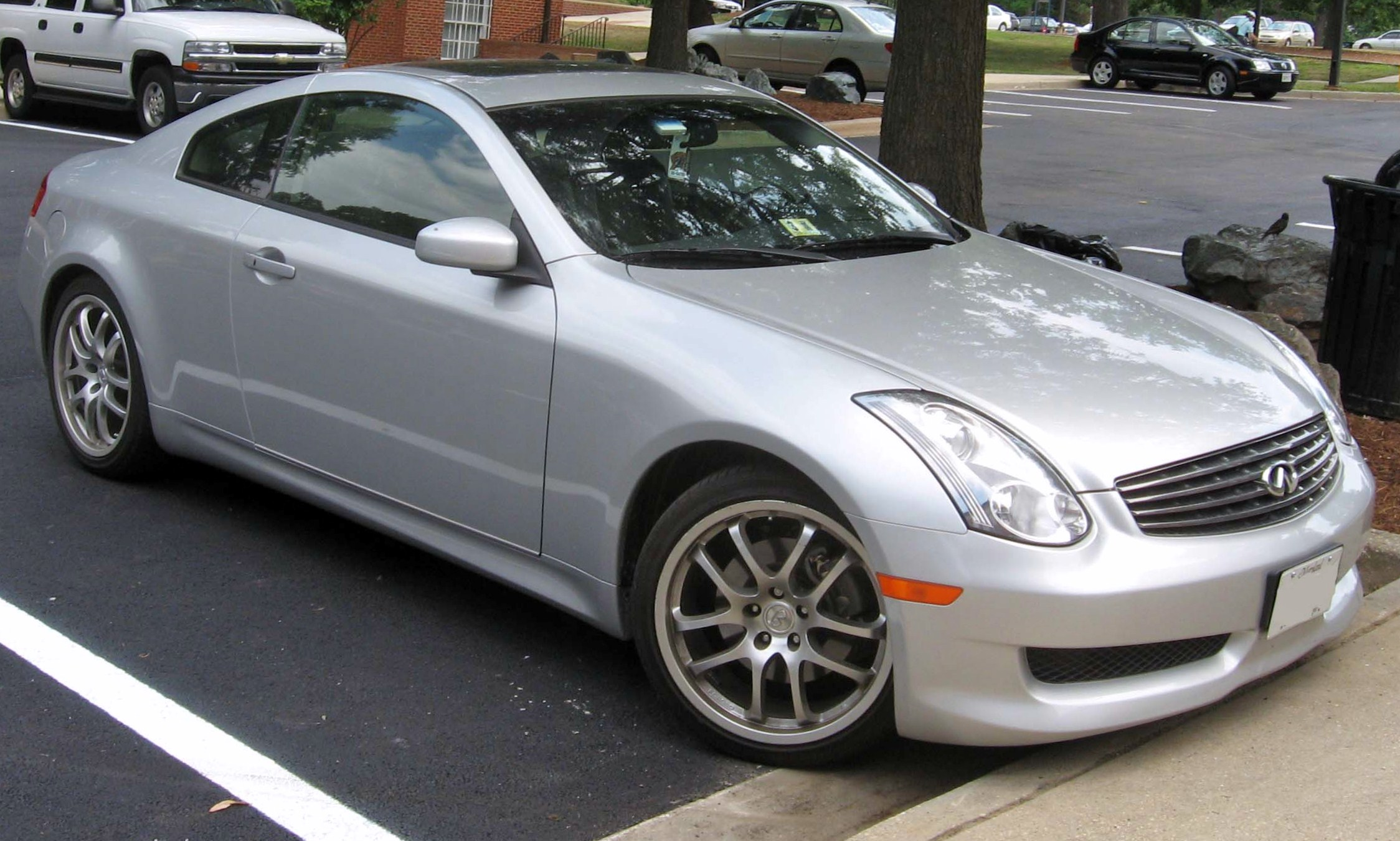
2006 Infiniti G35 coupe

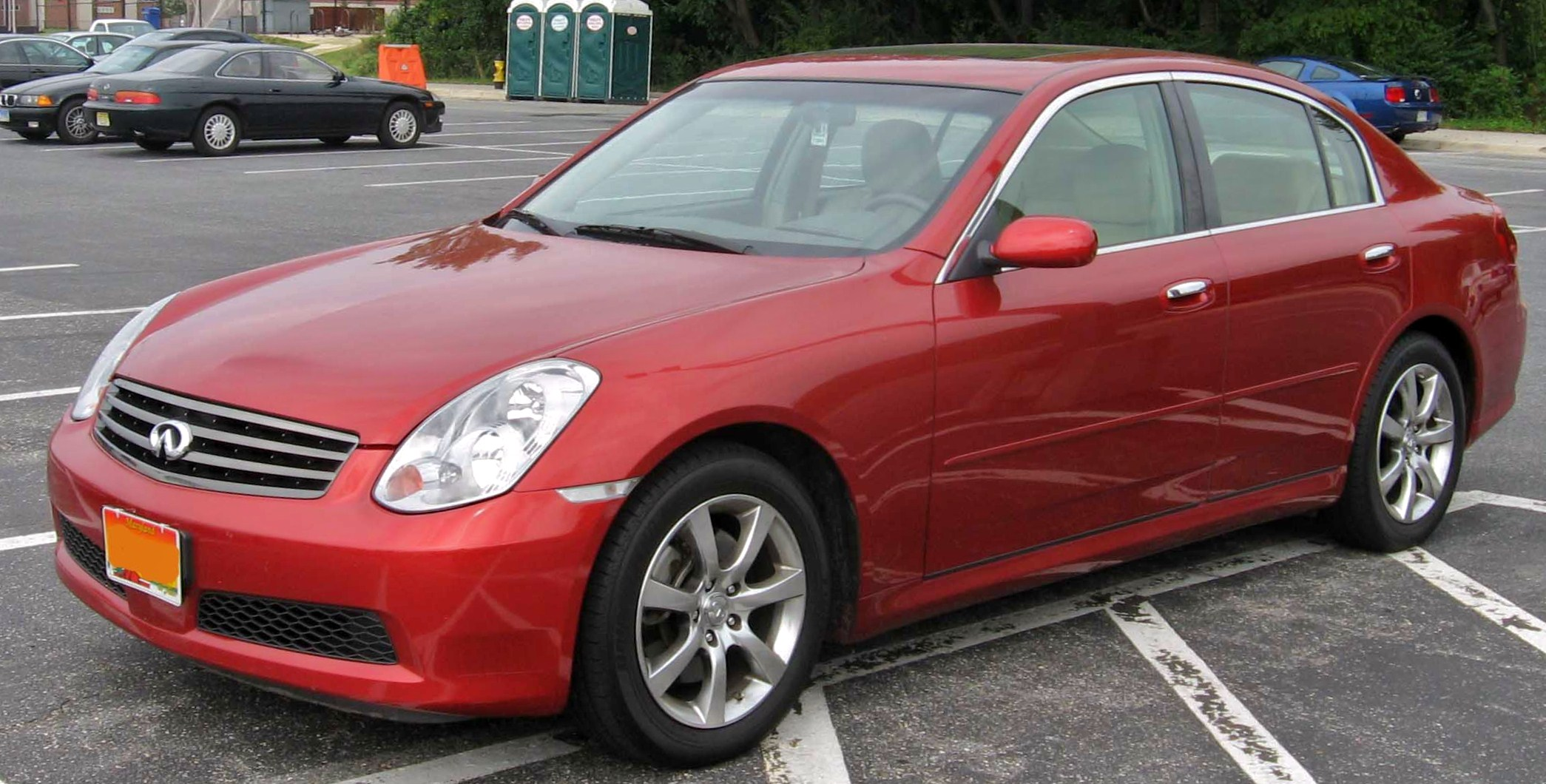
2006 Infiniti G35 sedan

The G35 sedan was refreshed inside and out for the 2005 model year and the coupe for the 2005 and 2006 model years. The interior received revised gauges, backlighting, trim and knobs. Aluminum trim replaces "tinted" interior trim, and the dash and center console layout were revised. Rosewood trim became available as a package on the 2005 models. MP3/WMA playback was added to the now standard 6 disc in-dash CD player, and the cassette player was removed. Brembo brakes were removed for the 2005 and 2006 models, and the brakes were redesigned with larger discs and a different caliper design. This was partly in response to a number of complaints about the previous years' brakes, which included a class action lawsuit filed in California related to premature wear on 2003–2004 models. A sport-tuned suspension package was standard on all six-speed manual equipped models, which included a viscous limited-slip differential and the higher output VQ35DE "Rev-UP" engine (this variant, while retaining the VQ35DE designation, featured variable valve timing on both the intake and exhaust camshafts; the exhaust side VVT was accomplished via the use of an electromagnetic phaser); cars ordered with the automatic transmission retained the standard VQ35, regardless of whether or not the sport-tuned suspension package was ordered. The 2006 models received minor updates. On the exterior there were new headlights, taillights, spoiler, sport side sills, and front bumper. Bluetooth capability was added to the interior for hands-free phone use. Rear active steering was an option for the '06 coupe.

== Fourth generation (V36; 2007) ==
G25, G35 and G37/ Q40 (V36)
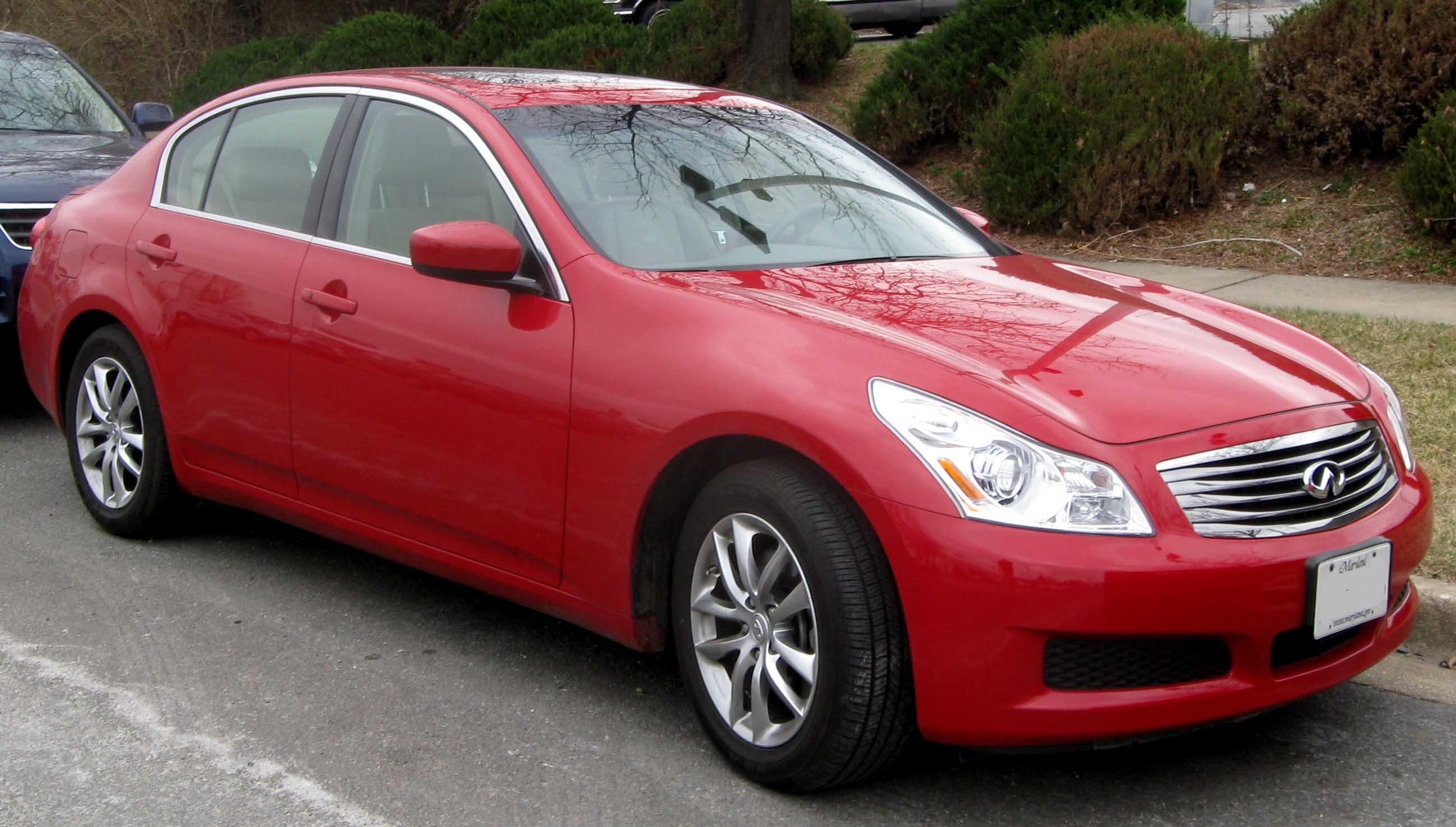

Overview
- Also called: Nissan Skyline; Infiniti Q60 (2013–2015 coupe and convertible); Infiniti Q40 (2014–2015 sedan)
- Production: September 2006–June 2015 (sedan); June 2007–2015 (coupe); 2009–2015 (convertible)
- Model years: 2007–2015 (sedan); 2008–2015 (coupe); 2009–2015 (convertible)
- Assembly: Japan: Kaminokawa, Tochigi
- Designer: Hideo Komuro (sedan: 2004); Shinichiro Irie (coupe: 2005, convertible: 2007)

Body and chassis
- Body style: 4-door sedan 2-door coupe 2-door convertible
- Layout: Front mid-engine, rear-wheel-drive / all-wheel-drive
- Platform: Nissan FM platform
- Related: Nissan 350Z; Nissan 370Z; Infiniti EX; Infiniti FX; Infiniti M

Powertrain
- Engine: Gasoline: 3.5 L VQ35HR V6 306 hp (228 kW) (2007–2008 sedan); 3.7 L VQ37VHR V6 330 hp (250 kW) (2008–2015 coupe) 3.7 L VQ37VHR V6 328 hp (245 kW) (2008-2014 sedan) (2015 has different headlights) 3.7 L VQ37VHR V6 348 hp (260 kW) (2010–2015 IPL coupe) 2.5 L VQ25HR V6 218 hp (163 kW) (2010–2012 sedan)
- Transmission: 6-speed manual 5-speed RE5R05A automatic (2007–2008 sedan, 2008 coupe); 7-speed RE7R01A automatic (all models, 2009—2015)

Dimensions
- Wheelbase: 112.2 in (2,850 mm)
- Length: 183.1 in (4,651 mm) (coupe); 187.0 in (4,750 mm) (sedan); 183.3 in (4,656 mm) (convertible)
- Width: 72.9 in (1,852 mm) (convertible); 71.8 in (1,824 mm) (coupe); 69.8 in (1,773 mm) (sedan)
- Height: Convertible; 55.1 in (1,400 mm); Coupe; 54.8 in (1,392 mm) (AT); 54.9 in (1,394 mm) (MT); Sedan; 57.2 in (1,453 mm) (RWD); 57.8 in (1,468 mm) (xAWD sedan) & 57.6 in (1,463 mm)
- Curb weight: 3,497 lb (1,586 kg) to 3,704 lb (1,680 kg)

The five-year development program for the V36 began in 2002, with conclusion in 2006 for the sedan and 2007 for the coupe. Design work started in 2003 and continued into 2004, when Hideo Komuro's design was chosen for the sedan. The coupe design process was later completed in the first half of 2005, with a conceptual variant being readied for public introduction. The redesigned Infiniti G sedan and coupe were introduced for the 2007 and 2008 model years, respectively. The fourth generation G sedan was launched in November 2006 as a 2007 model with a heavily revised 3.5 L VQ35HR engine and a 5-speed automatic as the standard transmission, a 6-speed manual was also available.

The redesigned second generation G coupe called the G37 launched in August 2007 as a 2008 model with a larger 3.7 L VQ37VHR, the first Infiniti engine to feature VVEL. Featuring 328hp for both the coupe and sedan models. It too came with either a 5-speed automatic or 6-speed manual. All manual G models include a sport package. The 2009 G37 convertible was launched in June 2009. The 2009 model G sedan followed suit using the same VQ37VHR engine. Also for 2009 the 5-speed automatic was replaced with an all-new 7-speed and both the sedan and coupe gained a self-healing paint finish from the Infiniti EX. The V36 platform continued for 2010 with numerous interior changes and upgrades as well as a mid-product cycle exterior update for the sedan. In late 2010 the Infiniti G25 went on sale as a 2011 model, featuring a smaller 2.5L version of the VQVHR engine to allow the G to better compete with the Lexus IS250 and BMW 328i.

=== Pre facelift models ===
==== 2007–2008 G35 Sedan ====
The G35 sedan underwent a major revision for the 2007 model year. This 2nd generation front-mid (FM) platform underpinning the new G is shared in part with the Infiniti M and has several structural reinforcements around the engine and rear floor area, along with three times more laser welding and 16 percent more spot welds than the old version; overall body stiffness was improved by 40 percent. Single-pivot lower control arms in front replace the 1st gen model's twin lower links. The G35x sedan uses an ATTESA E-TS all-wheel drive system. The optional Sport package included firmer rear shocks; bigger front brake calipers; larger 13-inch (330 mm) rotors all around (up from 12.6/12.1-inch front/rear); and a viscous limited-slip differential. A new Active Steering package could be ordered with the sport package and included a planetary gearset on the steering shaft (similar to BMW), that varies the steering ratio between 12.0:1 and 18.5:1. A rear-wheel steering system that induces up to one degree of rear steer is also included in this package. The Active Steering package includes again stiffer shocks than the sport package at all four corners. Base and Journey model 17-inch wheels were fitted with wider 225 section tires (up from 215), while the 18-inch wheel upgrade (included in sport or wheel package) with 225/50-ZR18 front and 245/45-ZR18 rear is now a size smaller in front and larger in back than the 1st gen model's all-around 235/45R18s.

The updated VQ35HR is more powerful (306 hp (228 kW) at 6,800 rpm and 268 lb⋅ft (363 N⋅m) at 4,800 rpm), more fuel efficient, and more responsive than the previous VQ35DE. The "HR" stands for "High Revolution" or "High Response". A dual-path intake (two air cleaners, throttle bodies, etc.) lowers intake tract restriction by 18 percent and new equal-length exhaust manifolds lead into mufflers that are 25 percent freer flowing. The intake is said to benefit from a ram-air effect adding three horsepower at 60 mph. Electrically actuated variable valve timing is new on the exhaust cams which broadens the torque curve. The new engine block maintains the same bore and stroke, but the connecting rods were lengthened and the block deck was raised by 8.4 mm to reduce piston side-loads. 80% of the internal components have been strengthened or redesigned to handle the increased 7,500 rpm red line, along with the use of larger crank bearings with main bearing caps reinforced by a rigid ladder-type main cap girdle. With an increase in compression ratio from 10.3:1 to 10.6:1 these changes add 26 more horsepower. Torque is down 2 pound force-feet (2.7 N⋅m) from the old DE engine (268 vs. 270). The engine now sits 15 mm lower in the chassis for a lower center of gravity.

Although the horsepower rating increased only 8 hp, actual horsepower was greater due to Nissan adopting the 2006 SAE hp measurement guidelines for horsepower ratings in 2007. According to Consumer Reports an Infiniti G35 Journey sedan with a 5-speed automatic transmission can reach 0–60 mph (0–97 km/h) in 5.4 seconds, and the 1/4-mile (400 m) in 13.8 seconds. According to the also newly revised EPA guidelines, fuel economy is estimated at 17 mpg_{‑US} (14 L/100 km; 20 mpg_{‑imp}) in the city and 24 mpg_{‑US} (9.8 L/100 km; 29 mpg_{‑imp}) on the highway. Fuel economy is virtually identical between generations, with the second generation earning a 1-mile-per-US-gallon (0.43 km/L; 1.2 mpg_{‑imp}) edge in highway driving (both measured using EPA 2008 guidelines).

Second generation G35 performance: According to Motor Trend and Automobile Magazine, a previous model 2005 G35 6MT sedan reached 0-60 mph (97 km/h) in 5.7 seconds and the 1/4-mile in 14.1 seconds. This gives the new 2nd gen G35 V36 sedan a solid 0.4 and 0.3 second performance advantage respectively. 5-speed automatics are on par with manual transmission cars from a performance perspective. In a 2008 Road & Track comparison test with the new 2008 Cadillac CTS a 5-speed automatic transmission equipped G35 sedan achieved a 0-60 mph (97 km/h) time of 5.3 seconds, a 0-100 mph (161 km/h) time of 13.1 seconds and a 1/4-mile (400 m) time of 13.8 seconds at 102.9 mph (165.6 km/h). Generally a V36 G35 reaches 60 mph (97 km/h) in the low 5 second range; 100 mph (161 km/h) in around 13 seconds and runs the quarter-mile in about 13.8 seconds. The 200 lb heavier all wheel drive versions are only approximately 0.3 seconds behind in each of these measurements.

Models (including the since 2009 G37):

- G35/G37 - 3.5/3.7 L V6, 306 hp (228 kW) / 328 hp (245 kW),
- G35/G37 Journey - 3.5/3.7 L V6, 306 hp (228 kW) / 328 hp (245 kW), weight 3,628 lb (1,646 kg)
- G35x/G37x AWD - 3.5/3.7 L V6, 306 hp (228 kW) / 328 hp (245 kW) 4WD, weight 3,882 lb (1,761 kg)
- G35/G37 Sport 6MT - 3.5/3.7 L V6, 306 hp (228 kW) / 328 hp (245 kW), weight 3,709 lb (1,682 kg)
- G37 Convertible - 3.7 L V6, 325 hp (242 kW), weight 4,083 lb (1,852 kg)
- G37 Convertible Sport 6MT - 3.7 L V6, 325 hp (242 kW), weight 4,149 lb (1,882 kg)

In addition, a special edition of the G37 was entered into the SEMA Gran Turismo Awards in 2008.

==== Infiniti Coupe Concept (2006) ====
Developed from mid-2005 to November 2005, it was a concept vehicle that previewed the design of the V36-based G coupe. It included a full-length glass panel roof, modulated front fenders and hood, deep front spoiler and large projector headlights, polished bare metal-look paint, compact camera outside rearview mirrors, hidden door handles and large 20-inch, 9-spoke painted aluminum-alloy wheels.

The vehicle was unveiled in the 2006 North American International Auto Show.

==== 2008 G37 Coupe ====
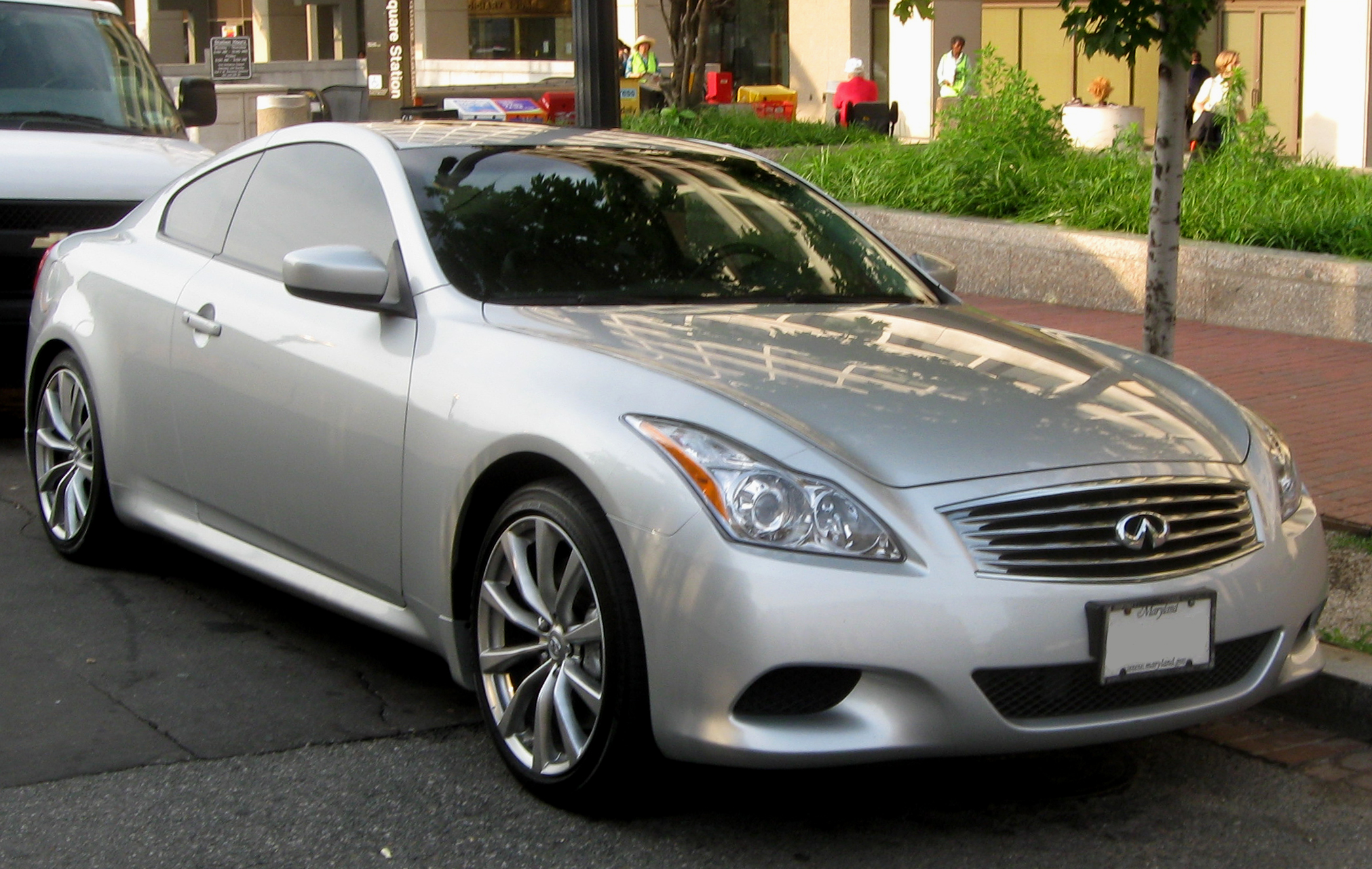
Infiniti G37S Coupe

In 2007, the redesigned G Coupe was unveiled at the 2007 New York International Auto Show and was available for sale as a 2008 model. Unlike the 2007 and 2008 G sedan it was given the new 3.7 L 330 hp (246 kW) V6 VQ37VHR engine but for this one model year still paired with the 5-speed automatic transmission and was named the "G37." In Japan, the G37 joined the updated G Sedan under the Nissan Skyline (V36) nameplate. This also marks the first use of Nissan's VVEL (Variable Valve Event and Lift) system on a production vehicle in the US market.

==== 2009-2013 G37 Sedan and Coupe ====
Infiniti G Sedan Transmission Ratios
	6MT		5AT		7AT	
Gear	Gear Ratio	Overall Ratio	Gear Ratio	Overall Ratio	Gear Ratio	Overall Ratio
1	3.7949	14.0108	3.8400	14.1773	4.9230	16.5265
2	2.3248	8.5832	2.3500	8.6762	3.1930	10.7189
3	1.6246	5.9980	1.5300	5.6488	2.0420	6.8550
4	1.2718	4.6955	1.0000	3.6920	1.4110	4.7367
5	1.0000	3.6920	0.8400	3.1013	1.0000	3.3570
6	0.7949	2.9348			0.8620	2.8937
7					0.7710	2.5882
R	3.4462	12.7234				
Final Drive	3.6920		3.6920		3.3570	

For the 2009 model the G35 sedan was replaced by the G37 sedan. The G37 sedan was first unveiled at the Geneva Motor Show for the European market. Exterior, interior and options remain identical to the 2008 G35 model range but the sedan now also sports the 3.7-liter VQ37VHR "VVEL" V6, rated 328 hp (245 kW) at 7,000 rpm and 269 lb⋅ft (365 N⋅m) at 5,200 rpm that was previously introduced in the G37 Coupe. Although the engine gains only 0.2 kg⋅m (2 N⋅m; 1 lb⋅ft) torque over the VQ35HR and this torque value arrives at a later 5,200 rpm vs. 4,800 in the VQ35HR, the torque curve itself is improved and flattened across the rpm range via Nissan's new VVEL (Variable Valve Event and Lift) variable valve timing resulting in better throttle response and low rpm torque.

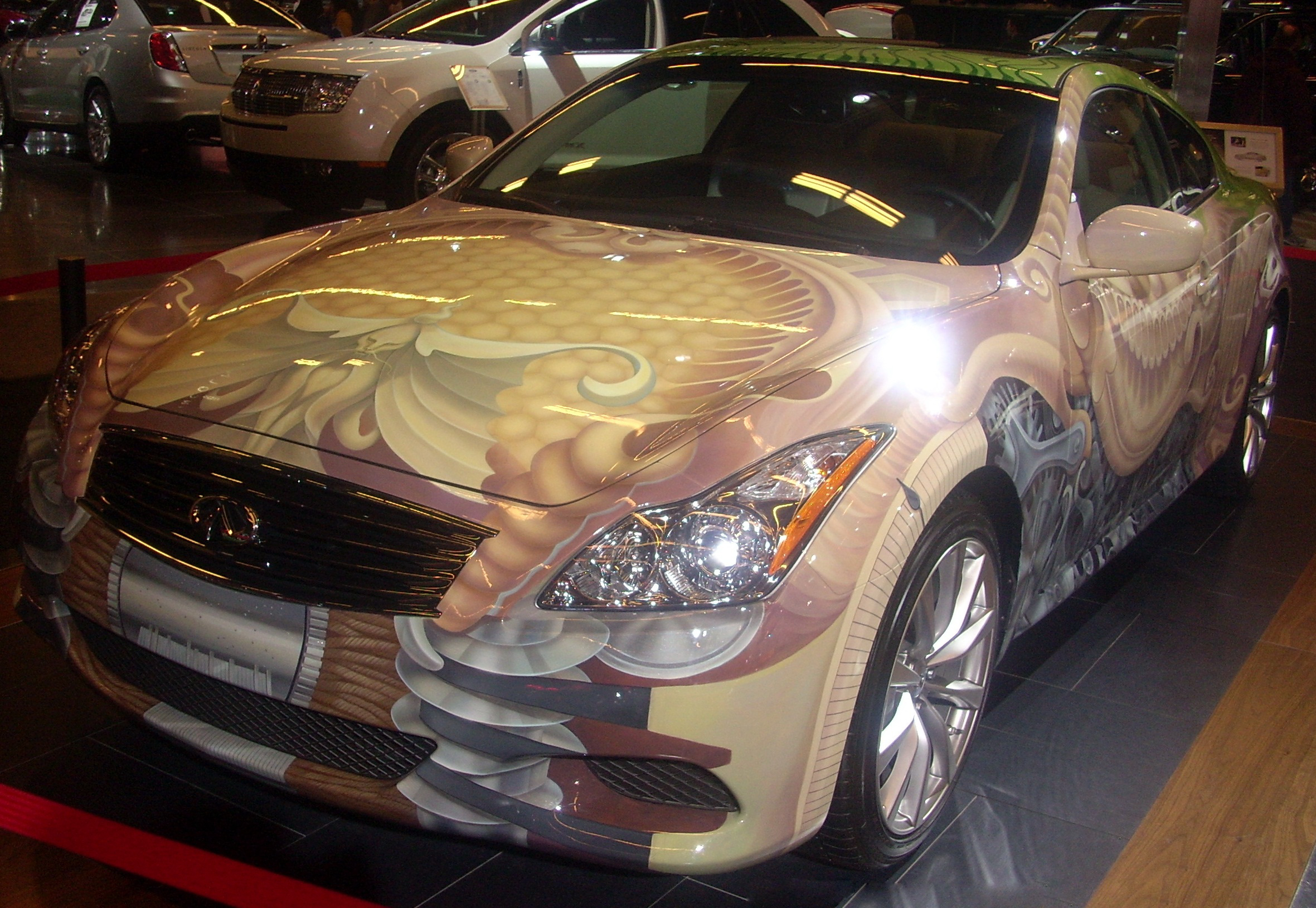
The 2009 Infiniti G37 Anniversary Art Project Vehicle

All 2009 models came standard with Infiniti's new seven-speed automatic transmission that was also introduced on the 2009 FX35 and FX50, updated from the previous five-speed transmission. The G37 Sedan or Coupe could be equipped with a six-speed manual transmission by specifying the Sport 6MT model. The Base, Journey and X models could not be ordered with manual transmissions, however the Sport Package included all sport options of the 6MT model (excluding the manual transmission and the hand lever parking brake), and was available for the Journey and X models.

The 2009 sport package (standard on Sport 6MT cars, optional on Journey and X models) now also included larger sport brakes with 4-piston front/2-piston rear calipers with 14-inch (360 mm) ventilated front rotors and 13.8-inch (350 mm) ventilated rear rotors, a new sport wheel design 18-inch (460 mm) for the Sedan and 19-inch (480 mm) on the Coupe, and Viscous Limited-Slip Differential (VLSD). The Sport Package on G37 x AWD Sedans does not include the larger opposed piston brakes, nor does it include the more aggressive steering rack, VLSD, or sport tuned suspension (the same package for AWD Coupes includes everything from the RWD version, save the more aggressive steering rack). Brakes on non-Sport models are front 13-inch (330 mm) ventilated discs and rear 13-inch (330 mm) ventilated discs with sliding calipers. The G37 is available as G37, G37 Journey, G37S 6MT and G37x AWD models. Major option packages remain to be the Premium Package, Sport Package, Nav Package, Tech Package. All 2009 models come standard with self healing "Scratch Shield" paint which employs a soft polymer top coat that can self heal small scratches and swirl marks.

Even though the final drive ratio for vehicles equipped with the 7-speed automatic has been (numerically) reduced from 3.69 to 3.36, the new 7-speed automatic has much lower first through fourth gear overall ratios than the old 5-speed automatic and the 6-speed manual in the 6MT cars (which retain the old 3.69 final drive ratio). Giving it closer gear ratios in all gears, to match engine rpm better with power demand, brings better acceleration while overdrive ratios in 6th and 7th gears reduces highway cruising rpm and improves fuel mileage. The new 7-speed automatic retains the Drive Sport (DS) shift mode and Downshift Rev Matching (DRM) feature of the previous 5-speed automatic. Paddle shifters are standard on G37S models equipped with the 7-speed automatic. The new engine/transmission combo did add some weight the car (3,590 lb. for the G37 vs. 3,508 for the G35 in identical trim).

The G37x Coupe uses an ATTESA E-TS all-wheel drive system.

The G37 coupe and sedan were set on sale in September 2008 as 2009 models.

The G37x Coupe and G37 sedan were unveiled in the 58th annual Pebble Beach Concours d'Elegance. Pictures of G37 convertible was first shown in Monterey, while the vehicle itself would be unveiled in the 2008 Los Angeles Auto Show in November.

The 2009 Infiniti G37 Anniversary Art Project Vehicle - This is a version of G37 Sport Coupe inspired by Cirque du Soleil to commemorate Infiniti's 20th anniversary. The vehicle was designed by Montreal artist Heidi Taillefer. The vehicle was set on tour at various Cirque du Soleil shows and other events, with eventual vehicle sale at charity auction.

==== 2009-2013 G37 Convertible ====
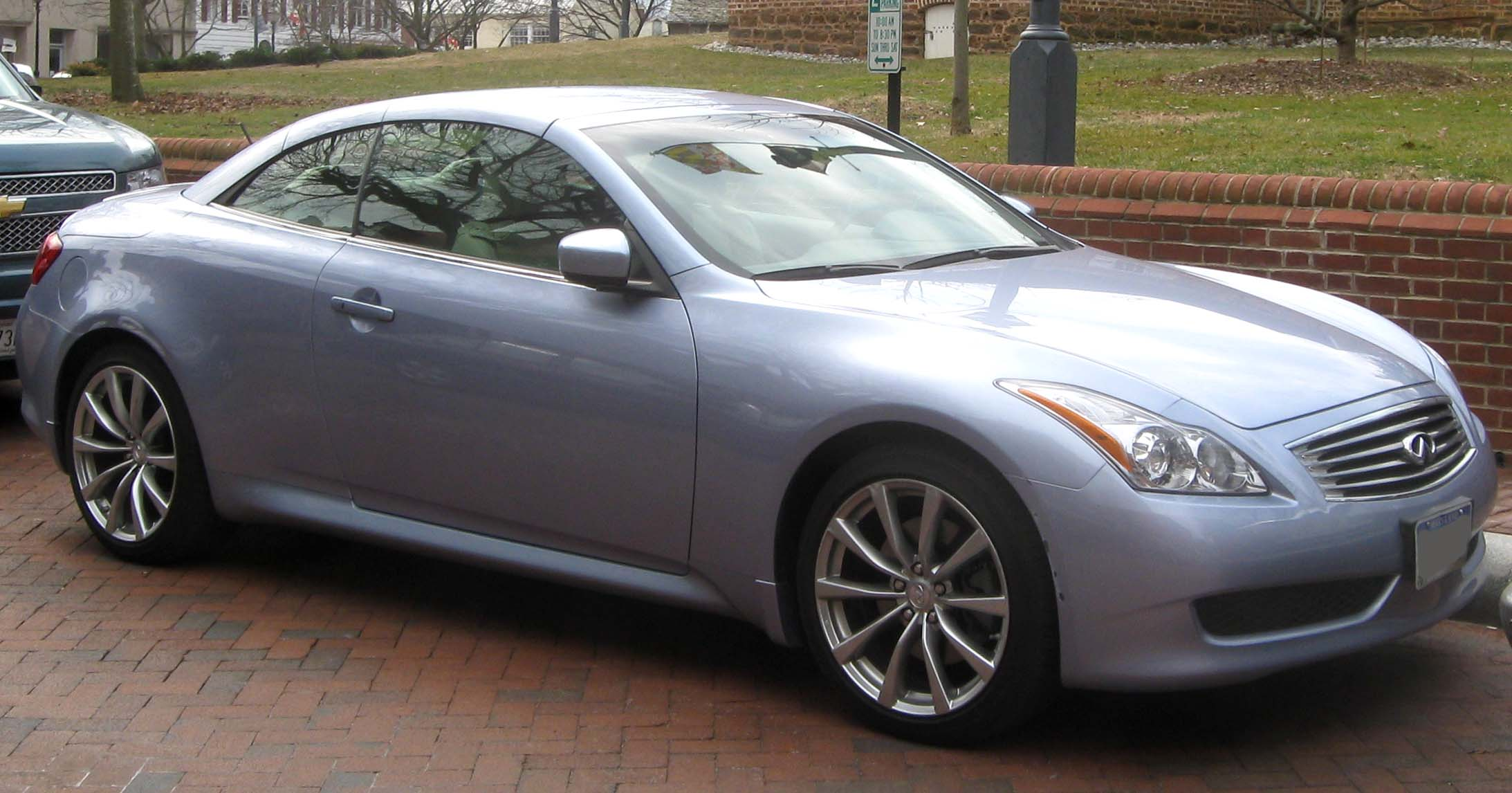
Infiniti G37 convertible

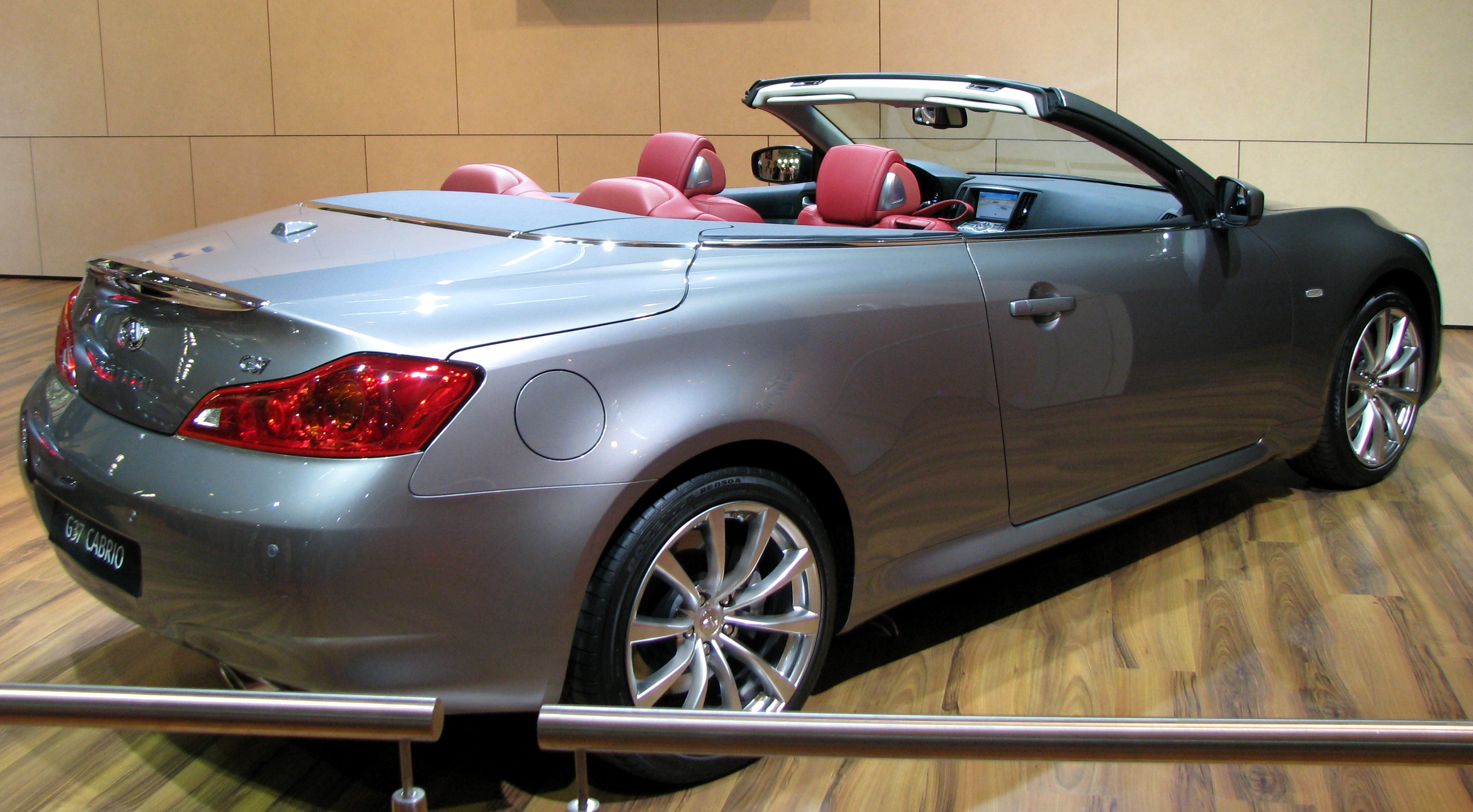
Infiniti G37 cabrio

G37 Convertible was introduced in June 2009 media release as a 2009 model on the V36 FM platform and is only from a design perspective based on the G Coupe. The G Convertible came equipped with a standard 325 hp (242 kW) 3.7-liter V6, backed by a choice of either a 7-speed automatic transmission with available magnesium paddle shifters or a responsive close-ratio 6-speed manual transmission. The G Convertible has a curb weight of 4,149 lb (1,882 kg).

=== Facelift ===
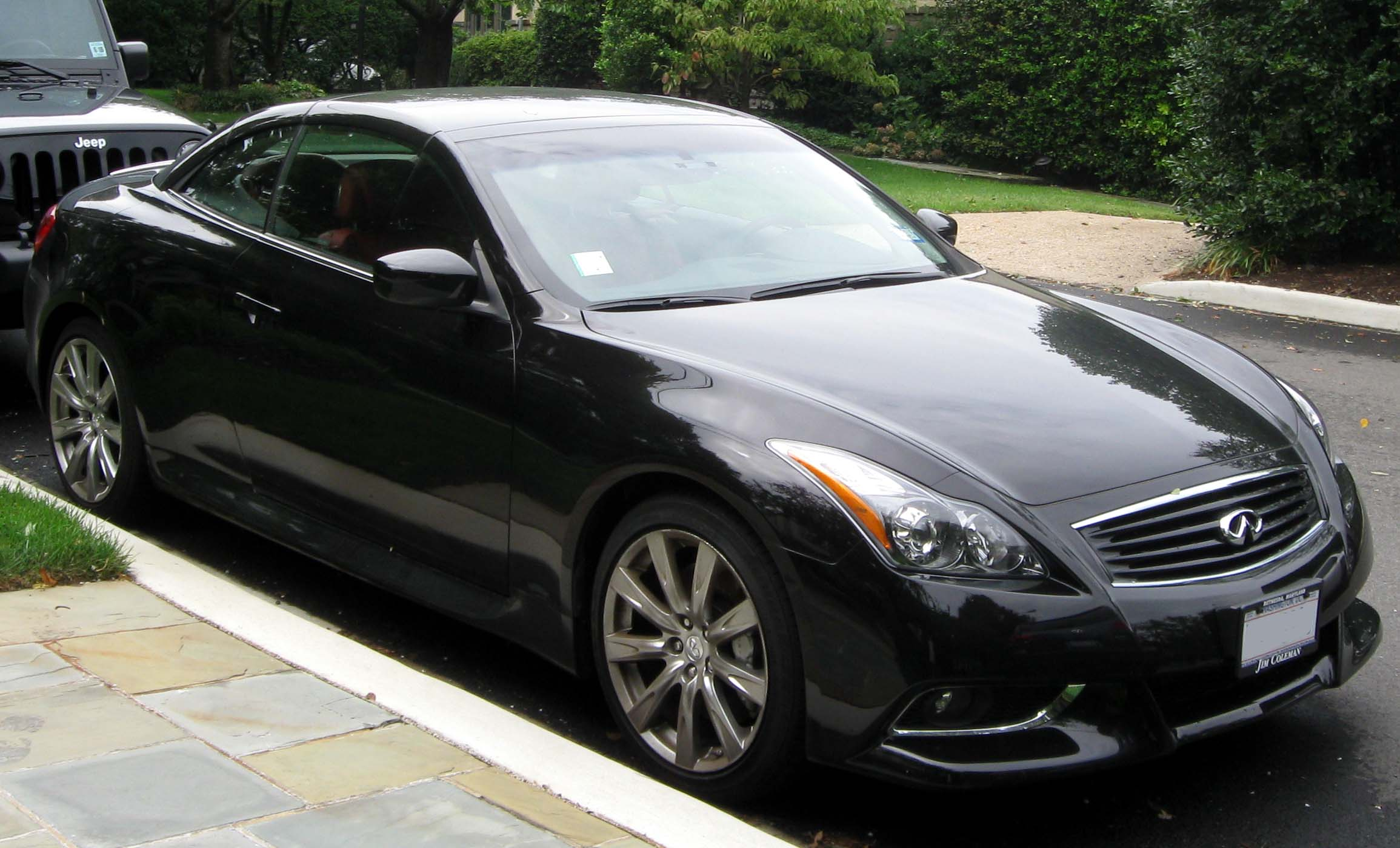
The facelift model 2011 G37 Convertible (US)

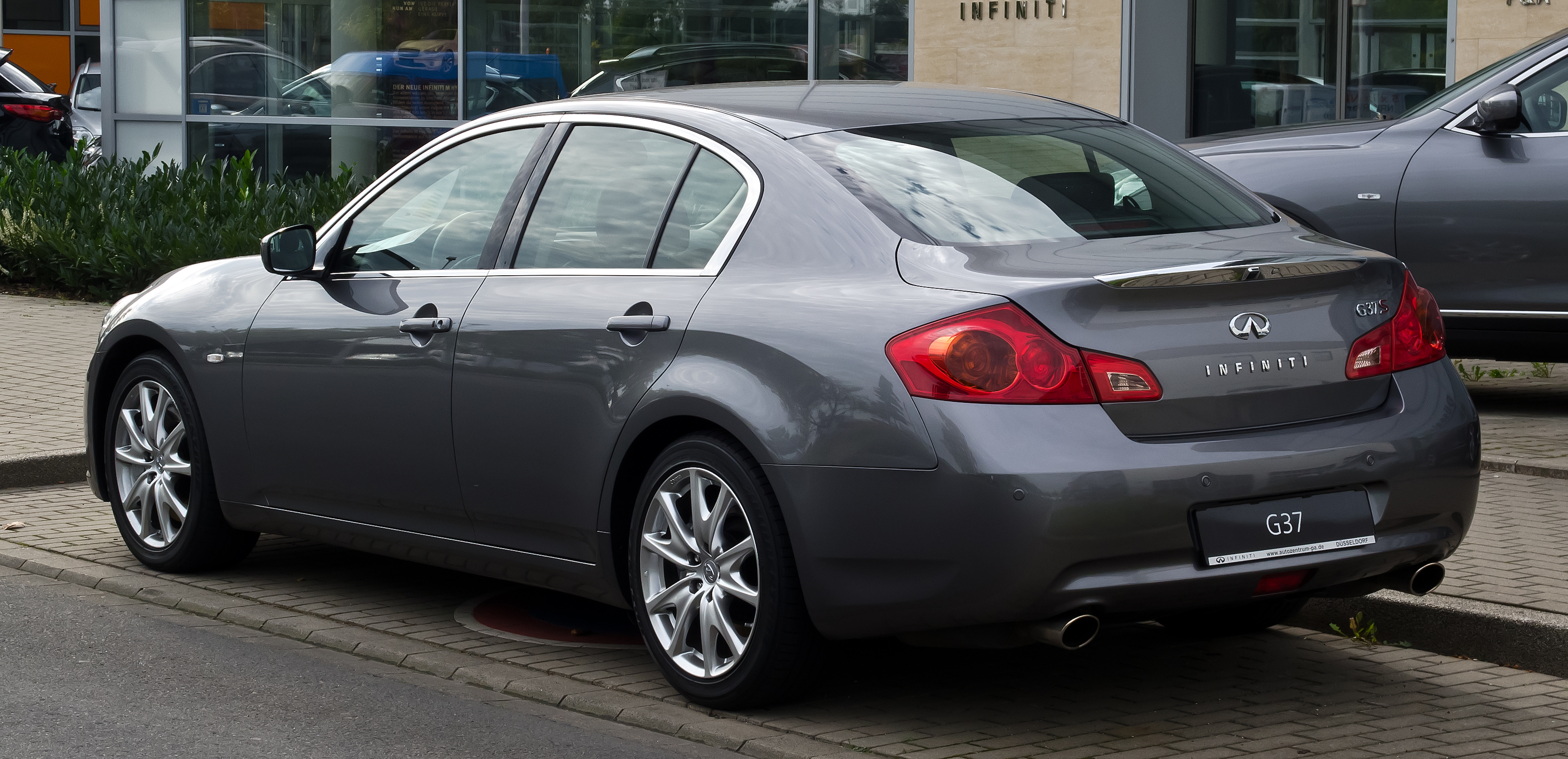
2010-2011 Infiniti G37 sedan (Germany)

From November 2009, a facelift for the 2010 model year G Sedan commenced production and went on sale in January 2010. Changes include a revised fascia with fog lamps moved from the head light cluster to the more traditional separate housings, a new grille for the sedan mimicking the one from the coupe, a new optional navigation system for both the coupe and sedan (revised from the optional system available with the 2008 and 2009 G37s). Other minor changes included new interior colors, trim, and lighting design for the dash and center display. Several items that were options on the 2008 and 2009 models became standard on the 2010 G37s.

In a March 2010 comparison test by Car and Driver, the Infiniti G37 Convertible came in third place out of four cars in a convertible comparison behind the BMW 328i and Audi A5.

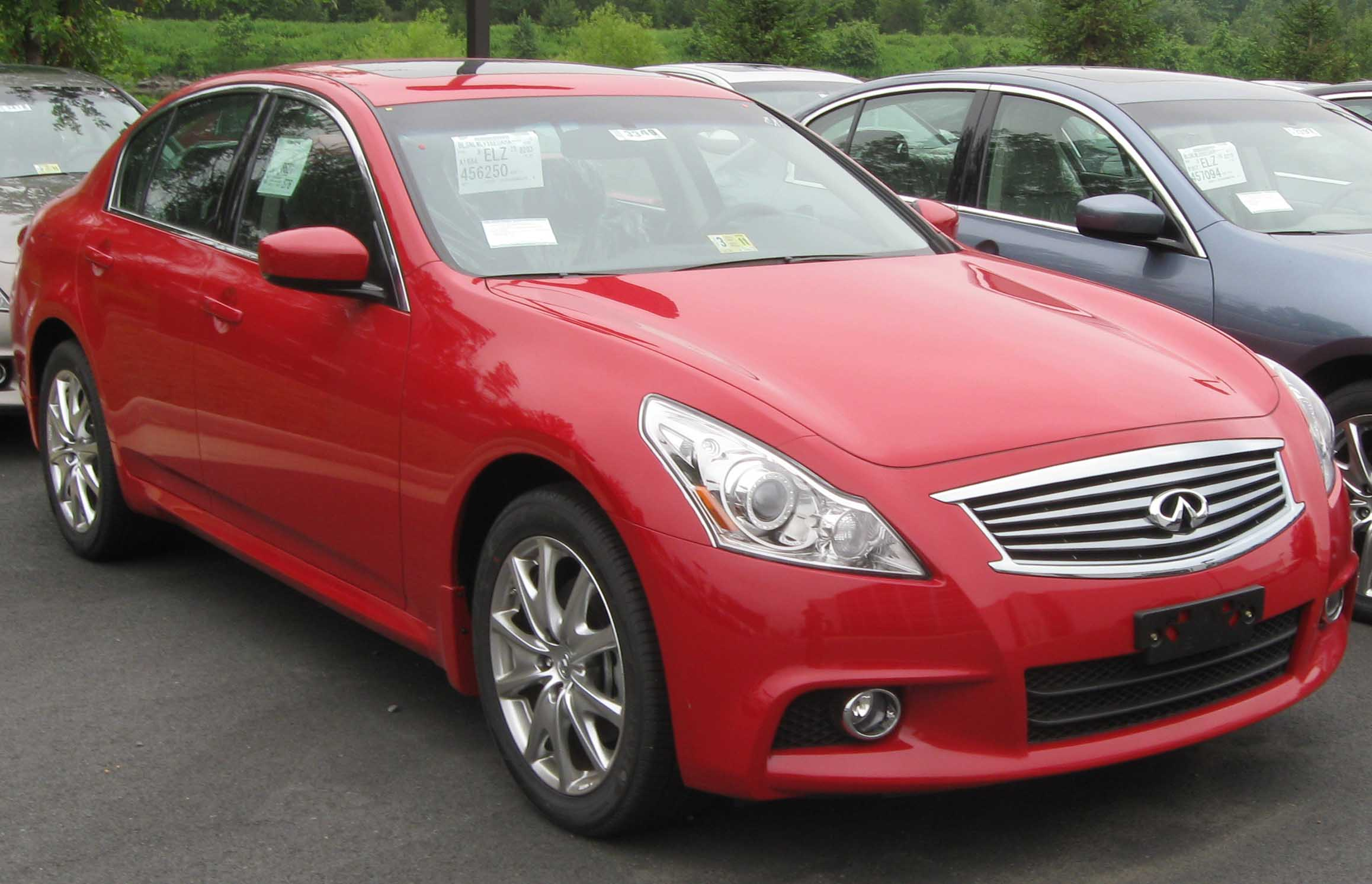
2010 model year refresh brought in revised headlight shape, along with a grille more similar to that of the coupe variant.

In July 2010, the Coupe and Convertible received a refresh for the 2011 model year.

==== 2011-2012 Infiniti G25 ====
Infiniti debuted the G25 sedan at the 2010 Paris Motor Show. The G25 was powered by a 2.5 L V6 VQ25HR producing 218 hp (163 kW) and 187 lb⋅ft (254 N⋅m) of torque. In a Motor Trend 2012 comparison the Infiniti accelerated from 0-60 mph (97 km/h) in 7.5 seconds, over 2 seconds slower than the G37. The G25's JDM relative, the Nissan Skyline 250 GT Sedan which features the same engine, had been on sale for several years already.

Priced lower than the G37, the G25 was aimed to compete with entry-level luxury rivals such as the Lexus IS250, Audi A4 and BMW 328i. Compared to the G37, other than a smaller engine and fewer options (no six-speed manual transmission available, no Navigation, no Premium or Technology packages in the U.S. market), the G25 was otherwise identical and features a choice of rear-wheel drive or ATTESA all-wheel drive.

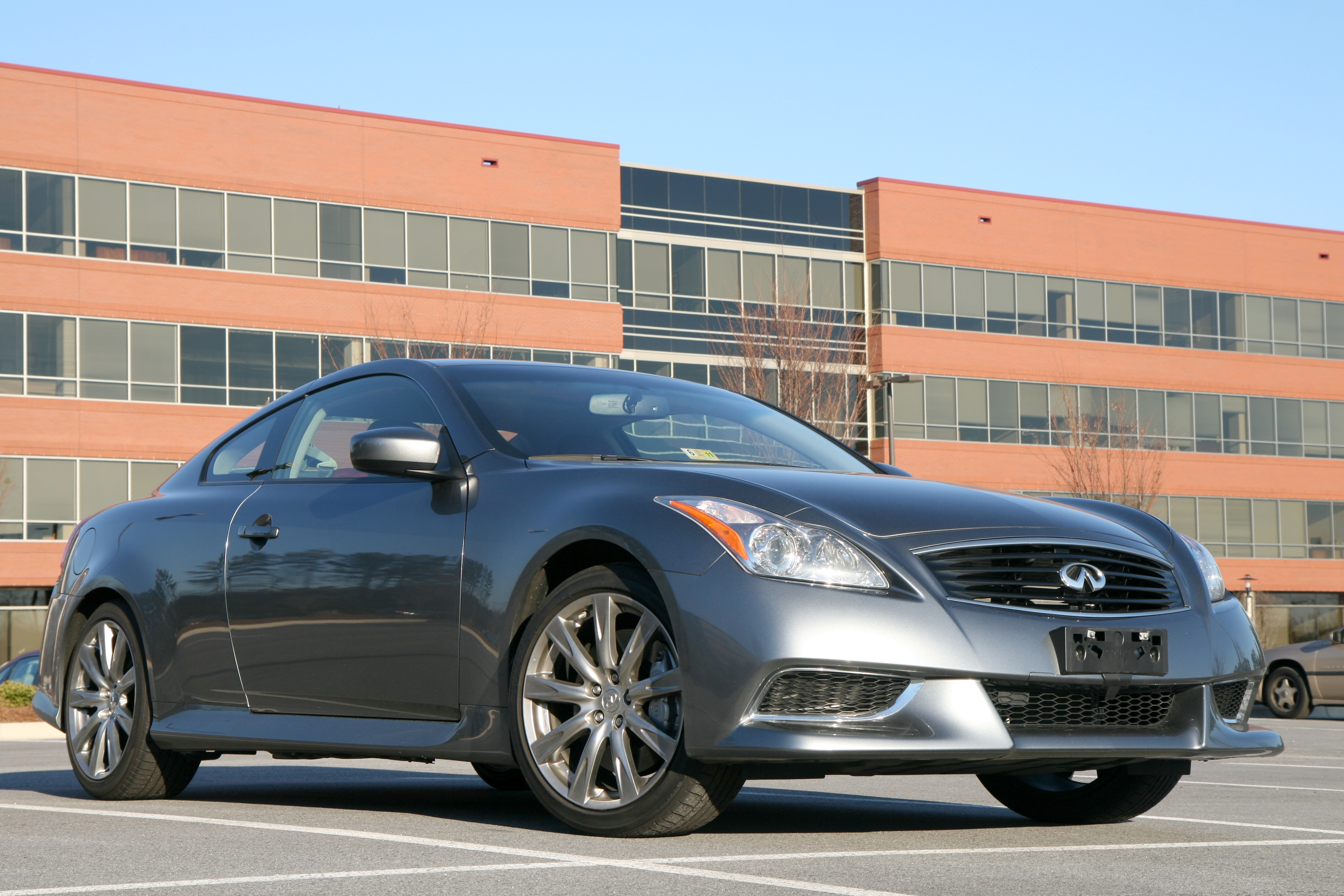
2011 Infiniti G37 Coupe IPL

In 2012, the G25 was discontinued in the United States.

==== Infiniti Performance Line (IPL) ====
In July 2010 Infiniti released its new performance division, Infiniti Performance Line (IPL). The debut IPL offering is the G37 Coupe for 2011 model year, and later the G37 Convertible. The IPL models featured a retuned engine producing 348 hp (353 PS; 260 kW) at 7400 rpm and 276 lb⋅ft (374 N⋅m) at 5200 rpm of torque. Performance improvements included a redesigned exhaust system, sportier suspension tuning, as well as a more direct steering feel. Design changes were made to the exterior including more aggressive front/rear bumpers and sideskirts, sportier 19 inch alloy wheels, and larger exhaust tips. Inside, the G37 IPL has red Monaco leather seats. The IPL G37 Coupe and Convertible are only available in Graphite Shadow gray metallic and Malbec Black. Like the regular models, the G37 IPL was also renamed Q60 IPL beginning 2014 model year.

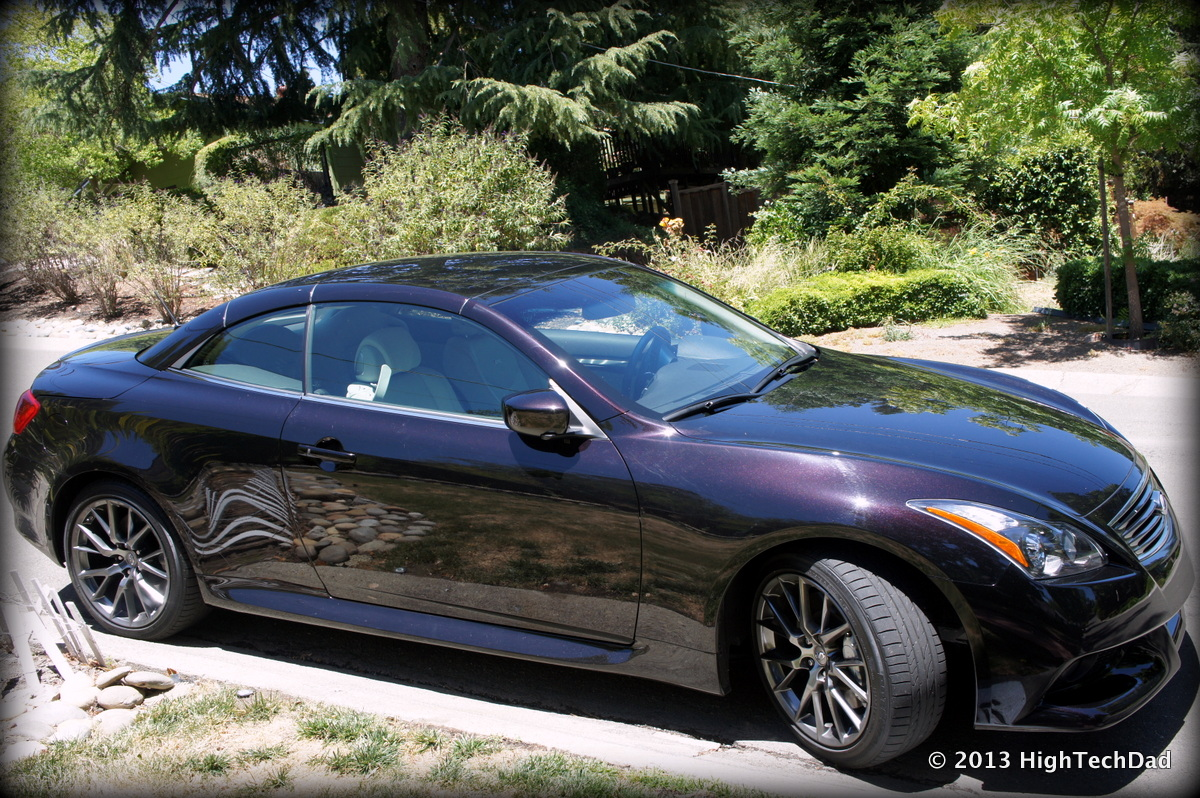
2013 Infiniti G37 Convertible IPL

== Successors ==
=== Infiniti Q40 ===
The Infiniti G37 sedan was renamed to Q40 for the production period between June 2014 and June 2015. The G37/Q40 sedan went largely unchanged for its final year and final production run in 2015.

=== Infiniti Q50 ===
For the 2014 model year, the all new Q50 sedan was sold alongside the fourth generation G/Q40, marketing the Q40 as a lower cost option. The Q50 sedan was code-named "V37" and made its debut at the 2013 North American International Auto Show (NAIAS).

=== Infiniti Q60 ===
The Infiniti Q60 is the coupe and convertible replacement for the Infiniti G37 coupe and convertible, and was released in July 2013.

== Specifications ==
	1991–1996	1999-2002	2002–2006	2006–2007	2007–2008	2008–2009	2009–2010	2010–2015
Generation	P10	P11	V35		V36 (sedan)	V36		
Generation	P10	P11	V35		V35 (coupe)	V36		
Powertrain
Engine	SR20DE 2.0 L (120 cu in) I4; 140 bhp (104 kW); 132 lb⋅ft (179 N⋅m)	SR20DE 2.0 L (120 cu in) I4; 145 bhp (108 kW); 136 lb⋅ft (184 N⋅m)	VQ35DE 3.5 L (210 cu in) V6; Sedan: 260 bhp (194 kW); 260 lb⋅ft (353 N⋅m); Coupe: 280 bhp (209 kW); 270 lb⋅ft (366 N⋅m)	VQ35DE 3.5 L (210 cu in) V6; Manual: 298 bhp (222 kW); 258 lb⋅ft (350 N⋅m); Automatic: 280 bhp (209 kW); 270 lb⋅ft (366 N⋅m)	Sedan: VQ35HR V6 306 bhp (228 kW); 268 lb⋅ft (363 N⋅m)		Sedan: VQ37VHR 3.7 L V6 328 hp (245 kW) 269 lb⋅ft (365 N⋅m)	
Engine	SR20DE 2.0 L (120 cu in) I4; 140 bhp (104 kW); 132 lb⋅ft (179 N⋅m)	SR20DE 2.0 L (120 cu in) I4; 145 bhp (108 kW); 136 lb⋅ft (184 N⋅m)	VQ35DE 3.5 L (210 cu in) V6; Sedan: 260 bhp (194 kW); 260 lb⋅ft (353 N⋅m); Coupe: 280 bhp (209 kW); 270 lb⋅ft (366 N⋅m)	VQ35DE 3.5 L (210 cu in) V6; Manual: 298 bhp (222 kW); 258 lb⋅ft (350 N⋅m); Automatic: 280 bhp (209 kW); 270 lb⋅ft (366 N⋅m)	Coupe: VQ35DE V6 298 bhp (222 kW); 270 lb⋅ft (366 N⋅m)	Coupe: VQ37VHR 3.7 L V6 330 hp (246 kW) 270 lb⋅ft (366 N⋅m)		
Transmission	5-speed Manual, 4-speed Automatic		6-speed Manual, 5-speed Automatic				6-speed Manual, 7-speed Automatic	
Dimensions
Curb Weight	2,535 lb (1,150 kg)-2,818 lb (1,278 kg) (depending on options)	2,913 lb (1,321 kg)-2,981 lb (1,352 kg) (depending on options)	Coupe 5AT: 3,416 lb (1,549 kg)-3,422 lb (1,552 kg); Coupe 6MT: 3,435 lb (1,558 kg); Sedan 5AT: 3,336 lb (1,513 kg)-3,677 lb (1,668 kg)(AWD)	Coupe 5AT: 3,505 lb (1,590 kg); Coupe 6MT: 3,524 lb (1,598 kg); Sedan 5AT: 3,449 lb (1,564 kg)-3,650 lb (1,656 kg)(AWD)				Coupe: 3,710 lb (1,683 kg); Sedan: 3,701 lb (1,679 kg); Convertible 6MT: 4,149 lb (1,882 kg)
Wheelbase	100.4 in (2,550 mm)	102.4 in (2,600 mm)	112.2 in (2,850 mm)					
Length	174.8 in (4,440 mm)	177.5 in (4,510 mm)	Sedan: 186.5 in (4,740 mm)		Sedan: 187.0 in (4,750 mm)			
Length	174.8 in (4,440 mm)	177.5 in (4,510 mm)	Coupe: 182.2 in (4,630 mm)			Coupe: 183.1 in (4,650 mm)		
Width	66.7 in (1,690 mm)		Sedan: 69.0 in (1,750 mm)		Sedan: 69.8 in (1,770 mm)			
Width	66.7 in (1,690 mm)		Coupe: 71.5 in (1,820 mm)			Coupe: 71.8 in (1,820 mm)		
Height	54.7 in (1,390 mm)	55.1 in (1,400 mm)	Sedan: N/A		Sedan: N/A			
Height	54.7 in (1,390 mm)	55.1 in (1,400 mm)	Coupe: N/A			Coupe: N/A		

== Safety ==
The fourth generation of the G features standard dual front airbags, front and rear side curtain airbags, and front side torso airbags. It was rated "Good" for each the "Front Offset" and the "Side Impact" crash tests while rated "Acceptable" for "Roof Strength" by the Insurance Institute for Highway Safety (IIHS). However, an IIHS Status Report released in 2007, ranked the 2003-2004 Infiniti G35 as the safest car in the Luxury Mid-size category and the second safest vehicle overall, based on its observed fatal-accidents rate.

== Awards and recognition ==
The G has earned many automotive awards over its lifespan:

- Car and Driver: 1991 (April & September) High marks for suspension and value.
- IntelliChoice: 1993 “Best Overall Import Car Value Over $13,000” and “Best Value in Compact Class Over $16,000.”
- J.D. Power and Associates: 1996 Top Score in Customer Satisfaction Index.
- J.D. Power and Associates: 1997 Second Highest Scorer in Customer Satisfaction Index.
- IntelliChoice: 1999 G20 and G20t “A Best Overall Value - Compact Sedan Over $15,000.”
- Consumer Reports First Place: Top 10 Cars (upscale sedan category) for 2007 and 2008
- CAR Magazine: Rated One of the Top 10 Best Handling Cars in the World (P11)
- Car and Driver "10 Best Cars" list: 2003, 2004, 2007, and 2009.
- Nominated for the 2003 North American Car of the Year.
- Motor Trend 2003 Car of the Year
- IGN Best of 2006 Awards: Best Japanese Car

== U.S. sales by calendar year ==
1990	1991	1992	1993	1994	1995	1996	1997	1998	1999
—	13,929	14,592	16,545	17,248	16,818	13,467	—	7,217	16,108
2000	2001	2002	2003	2004	2005	2006	2007	2008	2009
13,095	11,513	40,535	64,730	71,177	68,728	60,471	71,809	64,181	87,546
2010	2011	2012	2013	2014	2015	2016	2017	2018	2019
58,143	58,246	59,844	57,878	15,590	8,605	59	—	—	—
