= Solenoid (engineering) =

Device to convert electrical energy to mechanical

In engineering, a solenoid is a device that converts electrical energy to mechanical energy, using an electromagnet formed from a coil of wire. The device creates a magnetic field from electric current, and uses the magnetic field to create linear motion.

A solenoid is a type of electromagnet consisting of coiled copper wire wound tightly into a helix, a mobile plunger made of magnetic material, and an iron or steel housing. As electric current moves through a coil, the solenoid generates a magnetic field and transforms magnetic energy into mechanical motion.

In electromagnetic technology, a solenoid is an actuator assembly with a sliding ferromagnetic plunger inside the coil. Without power, the plunger extends for part of its length outside the coil; applying power pulls the plunger into the coil. Electromagnets with fixed cores are not considered solenoids.

In simple terms, a solenoid converts electrical energy into mechanical work. Typically, it has a multiturn coil of magnet wire surrounded by a frame, which is also a magnetic flux carrier to enhance its efficiency. In engineering, the term may also refer to a variety of transducer devices that convert energy into linear motion, more sophisticated than simple two–position actuators.

The term "solenoid" also often refers to a solenoid valve, an integrated device containing an electromechanical solenoid which actuates either a pneumatic or hydraulic valve, or a solenoid switch, a specific type of relay that uses an internal electromechanical solenoid to operate an electrical switch; for example, an automobile starter solenoid or linear solenoid. A solenoid bolt is a type of electromechanical locking mechanism.

== Applications ==
=== Electromechanical solenoid ===
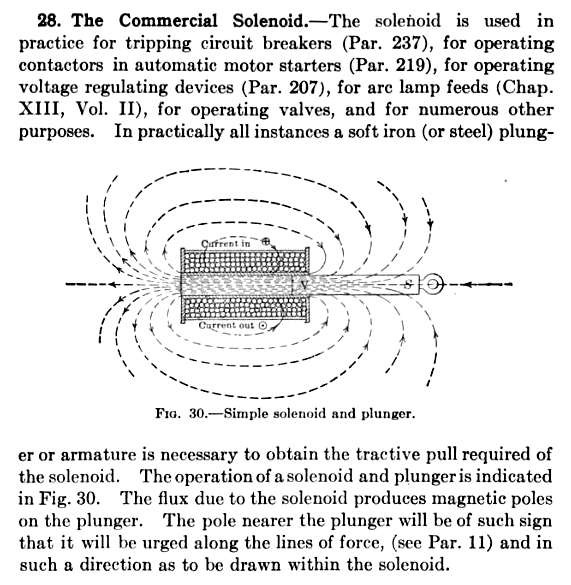
A 1920 explanation of a commercial solenoid used as an electromechanical actuator

Electromechanical solenoids consist of an electromagnetically inductive coil, wound around a movable steel or iron slug (termed the armature). The coil is shaped such that the armature can be moved in and out of the space in the center of the coil, altering the coil's inductance and thereby becoming an electromagnet. The movement of the armature is used to provide a mechanical force to some mechanism, such as controlling a solenoid valve. Although typically weak over anything but very short distances, solenoids may be controlled directly by a controller circuit, and thus have very quick reaction times.

The force applied to the armature is proportional to the change in inductance of the coil with respect to the change in position of the armature and the current flowing through the coil (see Faraday's law of induction). The force applied to the armature will always move the armature in a direction that increases the coil's inductance.

Electromechanical solenoids are commonly seen in electronic paintball markers, pinball machines, dot matrix printers, and fuel injectors. Some residential doorbells make use of electromechanical solenoids, whereby electrification of the coil causes the armature to strike metal chime bars.

=== Push and pull solenoids ===
Push and pull solenoids are common catalog items, usually in a tubular construction. They consist of a bobbin-wound coil, steel plunger, cylindrical case and end pieces, one of which is a stator pole. Each type is similar to the other in construction except that the pull type has means for attaching to the plunger and pulls the attached load toward the solenoid. The push type has a push-pin projecting out of the solenoid to push the load away from the solenoid. Magnetically they are the same; i.e., internally the magnetic field attracts the plunger toward the stator pole piece. Most solenoids do not use magnetic repulsion between the magnetic pole and plunger to do the pushing except in rare instances. Some permanent magnet types operate by simultaneous attraction and repulsion of the plunger in the same direction in order to actuate (and are bi-directional by reversing the coil's electrical polarity). Common push or pull solenoids move in one direction only upon being energized. A spring or other means is required to move the plunger to its de-energized position. Other constructions utilize a C- or D-shaped frame of bent flat steel and the coil may be visible. The efficiency of these types are due to their steel outer frames which enclose the magnetic flux around the coil (end to end) to focus the flux at the air gap between the plunger and stator pole.

=== Proportional solenoid ===
Included in this category of solenoids are the uniquely designed magnetic circuits that effect analog positioning of the solenoid plunger or armature as a function of coil current. These solenoids, whether axial or rotary, employ a flux carrying geometry that both produces a high starting force (torque), and has a section that quickly begins to saturate magnetically. The resulting force (torque) profile as the solenoid progresses through its operational stroke is nearly flat or descends from a high to a lower value. The solenoid can be useful for positioning, stopping mid-stroke, or for low velocity actuation; especially in a closed loop control system. A uni-directional solenoid would actuate against an opposing force or a dual solenoid system would be self cycling. The proportional concept is more fully described in SAE publication 860759 (1986).

Focusing of the magnetic field and its attendant flux metering, as illustrated in the SAE paper, is required to produce a high starting force at the start of the solenoid stroke and to maintain a level or declining force as the solenoid moves through its displacement range. This is quite contrary to that experienced with normal diminishing air gap types of solenoids. The focusing of the magnetic field to the working air gap initially produces a high mmf (ampere turns) and relatively low flux level across the air gap. This high product of mmf x flux (read energy) produces a high starting force. As the plunger is incremented (ds) the energy of motion, F∙ds, is extracted from the air gap energy. Inherent with the plunger increment of motion, the air gap permeance increases slightly, the magnetic flux increases, the mmf across the air gap decreases slightly; all of which results in maintaining a high product of mmf x flux. Because of the increased flux level a rise in ampere-turns drops elsewhere in the ferrous circuit (predominately in the pole geometry) causes the reduction of air gap ampere-turns and, therefore, the reduced potential energy of the field at the air gap. Further incrementing of the plunger causes a continuing decrease of the solenoid force thus creating an ideal condition for motion control as controlled by the current to the solenoid coil. The aforementioned pole geometry, having a linearly changing path area, produces a nearly linear change in force. An opposing spring force or a dual ended solenoid (two coils) allows over and back motion control. Closed loop control improves the linearity and stiffness of the system.

=== Rotary solenoid ===
The rotary solenoid is an electromechanical device used to rotate a ratcheting mechanism when power is applied. These were used in the 1950s for rotary snap-switch automation in electromechanical controls. Repeated actuation of the rotary solenoid advances the snap-switch forward one position. Two rotary actuators on opposite ends of the rotary snap-switch shaft, can advance or reverse the switch position.

The rotary solenoid has a similar appearance to a linear solenoid, except that the armature core is mounted in the center of a large flat disk, with three inclined raceways coined into the underside of the disk. These grooves align with raceways on the solenoid body, separated by ball bearings in the races.

When the solenoid is activated, the armature core is magnetically attracted toward the stator pole, and the disk rotates on the ball bearings in the races as it moves towards the coil body. When power is removed, a spring on the disk rotates it back to its starting position both rotationally and axially.

The rotary solenoid was invented in 1944 by George H. Leland, of Dayton, Ohio, to provide a more reliable and shock/vibration tolerant release mechanism for air-dropped bombs. Previously used linear (axial) solenoids were prone to inadvertent releases. U.S. Patent number 2,496,880 describes the electromagnet and inclined raceways that are the basis of the invention. Leland's engineer, Earl W. Kerman, was instrumental in developing a compatible bomb release shackle that incorporated the rotary solenoid. Bomb shackles of this type are found in a B-29 aircraft fuselage on display at the National Museum of the USAF in Dayton, Ohio. It was a 1-inch diameter version of the Leland solenoid that served as the camera shutter for Mariner-4's fly-by of Mars in July 1965. Solenoids of this variety continue to be used in countless modern applications and are still manufactured under Leland's original brand "Ledex", now owned by Johnson Electric.

Appearing on the market in the 1980s, the solely rotary solenoid with a balanced 3-lobed iron vane rotor offered improved vibration isolation by eliminating the axial motion of the rotor. This device allowed proportional, quiet positioning as well as a rapid rotation for uses such as mail sorters and conveyor gating. Then followed a permanent magnet rotor version (U.S. Patent 5,337,030; 1994 ) that provided rapid, electrical, bi-directional rotation.

=== Rotary voice coil ===
A rotary voice coil is a rotational version of a solenoid. Typically the fixed magnet is on the outside, and the coil part moves in an arc controlled by the current flow through the coils. Rotary voice coils are widely employed in devices such as disk drives. The working part of a moving coil meter is also a type of rotary voice coil that pivots around the pointer axis, a hairspring is usually used to provide a weak nearly linear restoring force.

=== Pneumatic solenoid valve ===
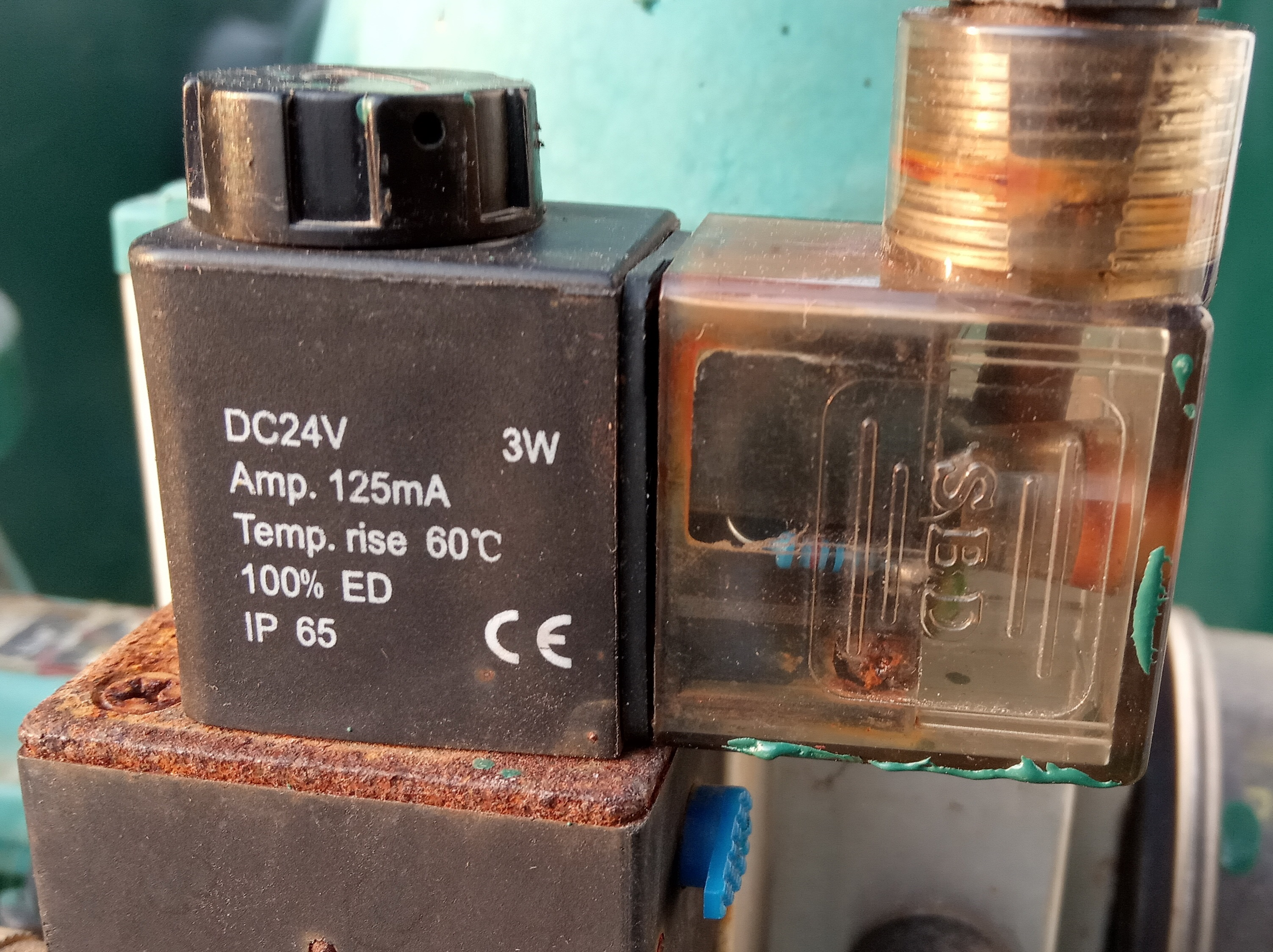
Solenoid of a pneumatic valve

A pneumatic solenoid valve is a switch for routing air to any pneumatic device, usually an actuator, allowing a relatively small signal to control a large device. It is also the interface between electronic controllers and pneumatic systems.

=== Hydraulic solenoid valve ===
Hydraulic solenoid valves are in general similar to pneumatic solenoid valves except that they control the flow of hydraulic fluid (oil), often at around 3000 psi (210 bar, 21 MPa, 21 MN/m^{2}). Hydraulic machinery uses solenoids to control the flow of oil to rams or actuators. Solenoid-controlled valves are often used in irrigation systems, where a relatively weak solenoid opens and closes a small pilot valve, which in turn activates the main valve by applying fluid pressure to a piston or diaphragm that is mechanically coupled to the main valve. Solenoids are also in everyday household items such as washing machines to control the flow and amount of water into the drum.

Transmission solenoids control fluid flow through an automatic transmission and are typically installed in the transmission valve body.

=== Automobile starter solenoid ===
In a car or truck, the starter solenoid is part of an automobile engine's ignition system. The starter solenoid receives a large electric current from the car battery and a small electric current from the ignition switch. When the ignition switch is turned on (i.e. when the key is turned to start the car), the small electric current forces the starter solenoid to close a pair of heavy contacts, thus relaying the large electric current to the starter motor. This is a type of relay.

Starter solenoids can also be built into the starter itself, often visible on the outside of the starter. If a starter solenoid receives insufficient power from the battery, it will fail to start the motor and may produce a rapid, distinctive "clicking" or "clacking" sound. This can be caused by a low or dead battery, by corroded or loose connections to the battery, or by a broken or damaged positive (red) cable from the battery. Any of these will result in some power to the solenoid, but not enough to hold the heavy contacts closed, so the starter motor itself never spins, and the engine fails to start.

== See also ==
- Coilgun
- Variable force solenoid
- Linear actuator
