= Transmission control unit =

Type of automotive ECU

A transmission control unit (TCU), also known as a transmission control module (TCM), or a gearbox control unit (GCU), is a type of automotive ECU that is used to control electronic automatic transmissions. Similar systems are used in conjunction with various semi-automatic transmissions, purely for clutch automation and actuation. A TCU in a modern automatic transmission generally uses sensors from the vehicle, as well as data provided by the engine control unit (ECU), to calculate how and when to change gears in the vehicle for optimum performance, fuel economy and shift quality.

== History ==
Electronic automatic transmissions have been changing in design from purely hydromechanical controls to electronic controls since the late 1980s. Since then, development has been iterative and today designs exist from several stages of electronic automatic transmission control development. Transmission solenoids are a key component to these control units.

The evolution of modern automatic transmission and the integration of electronic controls have allowed great progress in recent years. The modern automatic transmission is now able to achieve better fuel economy, reduced engine emissions, greater shift system reliability, improved shift feel, improved shift speed and improved vehicle handling. The immense range of programmability offered by a TCU allows the modern automatic transmission to be used with appropriate transmission characteristics for each application.

On some applications, the TCU and the ECU are combined into a single unit as a powertrain control module (PCM).

== Input parameters ==
The typical modern TCU uses signals from engine sensors, automatic transmission sensors and from other electronic controllers to determine when and how to shift. More modern designs share inputs or obtain information from an input to the ECU, whereas older designs often have their own dedicated inputs and sensors on the engine components. Modern TCUs are so complex in their design and make calculations based on so many parameters that there are an indefinite amount of possible shift behaviours

=== Vehicle speed sensor (VSS) ===
This sensor sends a varying frequency signal to the TCU to determine the current speed of the vehicle. The TCU uses this information to determine when a gear change should take place based in the various operating parameters. The TCU also uses a ratio between the turbine speed sensor (TSS) and wheel speed sensor (WSS) which is used to determine when to change gears. If either the TSS or WSS fails or malfunctions/becomes faulty, the ratio will be wrong which in return can cause problems like false speedometer readings and transmission slipping. To test these parts, check the resistance to make sure it's within manufacturer specs.

=== Wheel speed sensor (WSS) ===
Modern automatic transmissions also have a wheel speed sensor input to determine the true speed of the vehicle to determine whether the vehicle is going downhill or uphill and also adapt gear changes according to road speeds, and also whether to decouple the torque converter at a standstill to improve fuel consumption and reduce load on running gear.

=== Throttle position sensor (TPS) ===
The TPS sensor along with the vehicle speed sensor are the two main inputs for most TCUs. Older transmissions use this to determine engine load, with the introduction of drive-by-wire technology, this is often a shared input between the ECU and TCU. The input is used to determine the optimum time and characteristics for a gear change according to load on the engine. The rate of change is used to determine whether a downshift is appropriate for overtaking, for example, the value of the TPS is also continually monitored during the journey and shift programmes are changed accordingly (economy, sport mode, etc.). The TCU can also reference this information with the vehicle speed sensor to determine vehicle acceleration and compare this with a nominal value; if the actual value is much higher or lower (such as driving uphill or towing a trailer) the transmission will change its gearshift patterns to suit the situation.

=== Turbine speed sensor (TSS) ===
Known as an input speed sensor (ISS). This sensor sends a varying frequency signal to the TCU to determine the current rotational speed of the input shaft or torque converter. The TCU uses the input shaft speed to determine slippage across the torque converter and potentially to determine the rate of slippage across the bands and clutches. This information is vital to regulate the application of the torque converter lock-up clutch smoothly and effectively.

=== Transmission fluid Temperature sensor (TFT) ===
This may also be known as Transmission Oil Temperature. This sensor determines the fluid temperature inside the transmission. This is often used for diagnostic purposes to check ATF (Automatic Transmission Fluid) at the correct temperature. The main use of this has been as a failsafe feature to downshift the transmission if the ATF becomes extremely hot. On more modern transmissions this input allows the TCU to modify the line pressure and solenoid pressures according to the changing viscosity of the fluid based on temperature in order to improve shift comfort, and also to determine regulation of the torque converter lock-up clutch.

=== Kick down switch ===
One of the most common inputs into a TCU is the kick down switch which is used to determine if the accelerator pedal has been depressed past full throttle. Traditionally this was required on older transmissions with a simple logic in order to ensure maximum acceleration. When activated the transmission downshifts into the lowest permissible gear based on current road speed to use the full power reserves of the engine. This is still present in most transmissions though is no longer necessary to use in most circumstances because the TCU uses the throttle position sensor, the rate of change, and driver characteristics to determine whether a downshift may be necessary, thus eliminating the traditional need for this switch.

=== Brake light switch ===
This input is used to determine whether to activate the shift lock solenoid to prevent the driver from selecting a driving range with no foot on the brake. In more modern TCUs this input is also used to determine whether to downshift the transmission to increase engine braking effect if the transmission detects that the vehicle is going downhill.

=== Traction Control System (TCS) ===
Many TCUs now have an input from the vehicle's traction control system. If the TCS detects unfavourable road conditions, a signal is sent to the TCU. The TCU can modify shift programmes by upshifting early, eliminating the torque converter lock-up clutch application, and also eliminating the first gear totally and pulling off in 2nd.

=== Switches ===
These simple on/off electric switches detect the presence or absence of fluid pressure in a particular hydraulic line. They are used for diagnostic purposes and in some cases for controlling the application or release of hydraulic control elements.

=== Cruise control module ===
If the vehicle is fitted with cruise control the TCU may also have a connection to cruise control system. This can modify shift behaviour to take into account the throttle is not being operated by the driver to eliminate unexpected gearchanges when the cruise control is engaged. This is also used to inform the cruise control system about the position of the selector lever so that the cruise control can be deactivated if the lever is shifted out of a driving range.

=== Inputs from other controllers ===
A wide variety of information is delivered to the TCU via Controller Area Network communications or similar protocols (such as Chrysler's CCD bus, an early EIA-485-based vehicle local area network). In older vehicle designs, as well as in aftermarket TCUs sold into the racing and hobbyist markets, the TCU receives only the signals needed to control the transmission (engine speed, vehicle speed, throttle position or manifold vacuum, shift lever position).

== Output parameters ==
The typical modern TCU sends out signals to shift solenoids, pressure control solenoids, torque converter lockup solenoids and to other electronic controllers.

=== Shift lock ===
Many automatic transmissions lock the selector lever via a shiftlock solenoid to stop a driving range being selected if the brake pedal is not depressed.

=== Shift solenoids ===
Modern electronic automatic transmissions have electrical solenoids which are activated to change gears. Simple electronic-control designs (such as Ford's AOD-E, AXOD-E and E4OD) use the solenoids to modify the shift points in an existing valve body, while more advanced designs (such as the Chrysler Ultradrive and its follow-ons) use the solenoids to control the clutches indirectly, by way of a greatly simplified valve body.

=== Pressure control solenoids ===
Modern electronic automatic transmissions are still fundamentally hydraulic. This requires precise pressure control. Older automatic transmission designs only use a single line pressure control solenoid which modifies pressure across the entire transmission. Newer automatic transmission designs often use many pressure control solenoids, and sometimes allow the shift solenoids themselves to provide precise pressure control during shifts by ramping the solenoid on and off. The shift pressure affects the shift quality (too high a pressure will result in rough shifting; too low a pressure will cause the clutches to overheat) and shift speed.

=== Torque converter clutch solenoid (TCC) ===
Most electronic automatic transmissions utilize a TCC solenoid to regulate the torque converter electronically. Once fully locked, the torque converter no longer applies torque multiplication and will spin at the same speed as the engine. This provides a major increase in fuel economy. Modern designs provide partial lockup in lower gears to improve fuel economy further, but this can increase wear on the clutch components.

=== Output to ECU ===
Many TCUs provide an output to the ECU to retard the ignition timing, or reduce the fuel quantity, for a few milliseconds to reduce load on the transmission during heavy throttle. This allows automatic transmissions to shift smoothly even on engines with large amounts of torque which would otherwise result in a harder shift and possible damage to the gearbox.

=== Outputs to other controllers ===
The TCU provides information about the health of the transmission, such as clutch wear indicators and shift pressures, and can raise trouble codes and set the malfunction indicator lamp on the instrument cluster if a serious problem is found. An output to the cruise control module is also often present to deactivate the cruise control if a neutral gear is selected, just like on a manual transmission.

== Other applications ==
=== Semi-automatic transmission ===
The transmission control unit (TCU) in older automobiles with a clutchless manual transmission (without a clutch pedal) typically consists of an electrical switch connected to the gearshift, that is activated whenever the internal transmission control unit senses driver touching the gearshift to switch gears, which then primes a sensor or solenoid to impel a clutch servo, and in turn, disengages the clutch actuator so the driver can change gears. The internal clutch actuator in a semi-automatic transmission can be powered by either hydraulic, pneumatic, or electric means. Later examples of clutchless manual transmissions used in road cars include the Saab Sensonic transmission, used in the 900 NG, and the Ferrari Valeo auto-manual transmission, used in the Mondial T. Both systems used a computer-controlled ECU or microprocessor, connected to a sensor embedded in the gearshift, that would detect when the driver was going to change gear (i.e., by touching the gearshift), and would actuate the clutch automatically, allowing the driver to change gear. Saab's Sensonic system was electro-hydraulic, using an electric motor or solenoid connected to a hydraulic clutch actuator, whereas Ferrari's Valeo system was electro-mechanical, using an electric motor or solenoid, connected to the mechanical clutch system.

Similar TCU or GCU systems are used in racecars with paddle-shift transmissions. These electronic systems typically work in conjunction with the engine control unit (in a similar way to road cars), and are responsible for operating electronic throttle control, clutch and gearshift actuation (via an electric, hydraulic, or pneumatic actuator), gearshift time and speed, sensors, switches, solenoids, and other hydraulic, pneumatic, and electronic sub-systems that control and constitute the transmission control unit in a racecar.
