= Transmission solenoid =

A transmission solenoid or cylinoid is an electro-hydraulic valve that controls fluid flow into and throughout an automatic transmission. Solenoids can be normally open or normally closed. They operate via a voltage or current supplied by the transmission computer or controller. Transmission solenoids are usually installed in a transmission valve body, transmission control unit, or transmission control module.

== Types ==
- Variable force solenoid
- On-off solenoid
- Pulse-width modulated solenoid
- Low leak variable bleed solenoid

== Manufacturers ==
- American Axle
- ZF
- TREMEC
- BorgWarner
- Eaton
- Bosch
- Hilite Industries
- Saturn Engineering and Electronics
- TLX Technologies
