= Infiniti Q50 =

Nissan compact executive car, 2013–2024

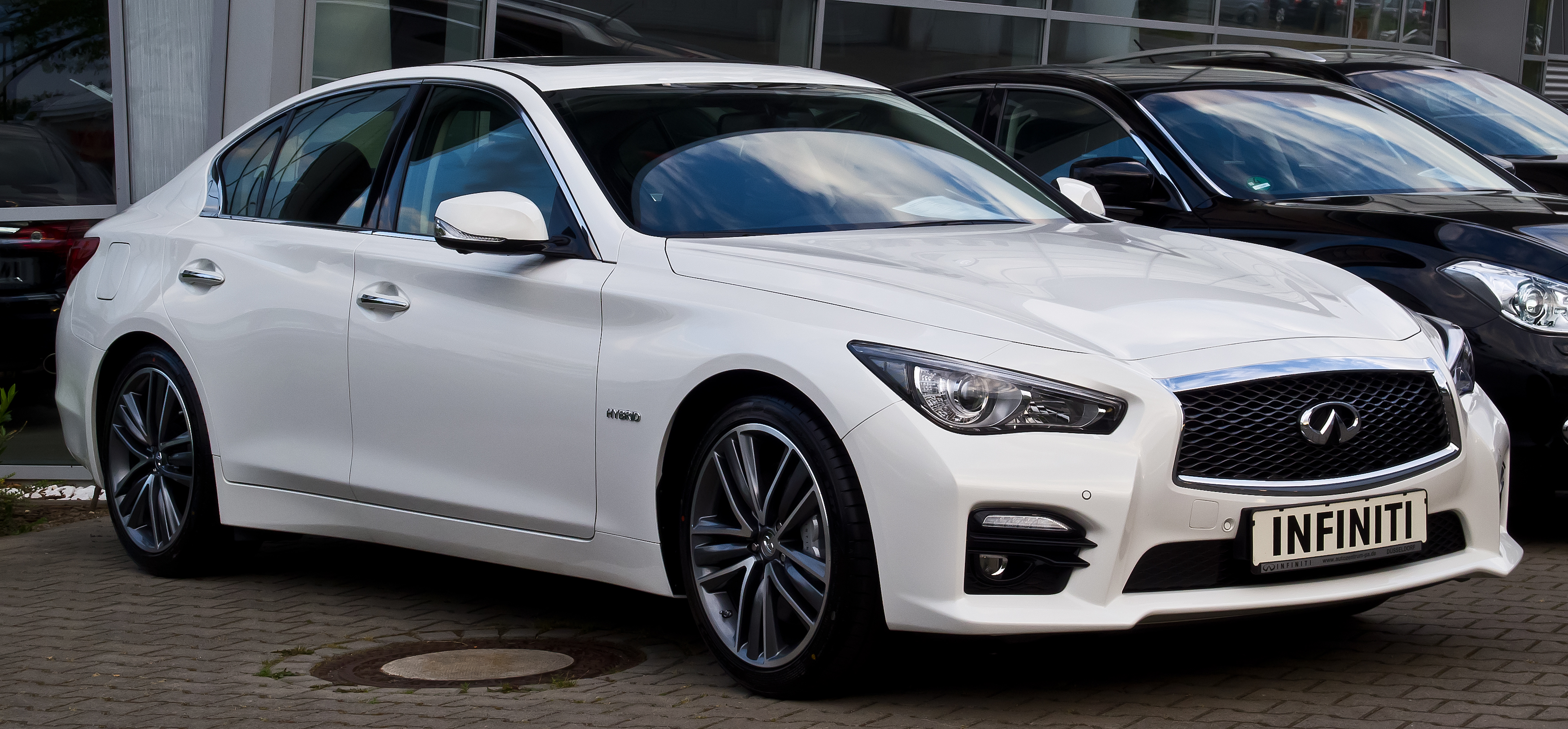

Overview
- Manufacturer: Nissan
- Model code: V37
- Also called: Nissan Skyline
- Production: 2013–2024
- Model years: 2014–2024
- Assembly: Japan: Kaminokawa, Tochigi; China: Xiangyang, Hubei (Q50L)
- Designer: Joel Baek, Hirohisa Ono and Koichi Ishizuka

Body and chassis
- Class: Compact executive car (D-segment)
- Body style: 4-door sedan
- Layout: Front mid-engine, rear-wheel-drive / all-wheel-drive
- Platform: Nissan FM platform
- Related: Infiniti Q60

Powertrain
- Engine: Gasoline: 2.0 L Mercedes-Benz M274 DE20 LA I4; 3.0 L VR30DDTT twin-turbo V6; 3.5 L VQ35HR V6 (hybrid); 3.7 L VQ37VHR V6; Diesel: 2.1 L Mercedes-Benz OM651 I4
- Electric motor: 50 kW Nissan HM34 high-response motor (hybrid)
- Transmission: 6-speed manual (diesel); 7-speed 7R01 automatic; 7-speed 7G-Tronic automatic

Dimensions
- Wheelbase: 2,850 mm (112.2 in); 2,900 mm (114.2 in) (Q50L)
- Length: 4,785–4,815 mm (188.4–189.6 in); 4,850 mm (190.9 in) (Q50L)
- Width: 1,825 mm (71.9 in)
- Height: 1,445–1,450 mm (56.9–57.1 in)
- Curb weight: 1,690–1,815 kg (3,726–4,001 lb)

Chronology
- Predecessor: Infiniti G

The Infiniti Q50 is a compact executive car manufactured by both Nissan and Dongfeng Nissan for its luxury brand, Infiniti. Replacing the G sedan, it debuted at the 2013 North American International Auto Show and went on sale in North America in the third quarter of 2013 and in Europe in the fourth quarter of 2013. It is the export model of the Japanese domestic market's V37 Nissan Skyline.

The design of the Q50 continues to follow the design language first shown by the 2009 Infiniti Essence concept and the production 2011 Infiniti M. The Q50 is also the first instance of a hybrid powertrain in Infiniti's entry-level model, but it was discontinued in 2019. It was notable for not having a traditional steering column.

== Q50 sedan (2013–2024) ==
The design was based on the Infiniti Essence (crescent-cut C-pillar, deep body section, asymmetrical cabin layout, interior finishes) and the Infiniti Etherea (headlights, three-dimensional double-arch grille, interior finishes). The production Q50 design was frozen in June 2011, after being designed by Joel Baek under Shiro Nakamura.

The Q50 sedan was unveiled at the 2013 North American International Auto Show, followed by the 2013 Canadian International AutoShow, 2013 Geneva Motor Show (with Hybrid and 2.2d), 2013 Dubai International Motor Show, Auto Guangzhou Motor Show in China (with 2.0-liter (214PS) turbocharged engine from Daimler AG (Mercedes-Benz)), and Victoria Harbour in Hong Kong.

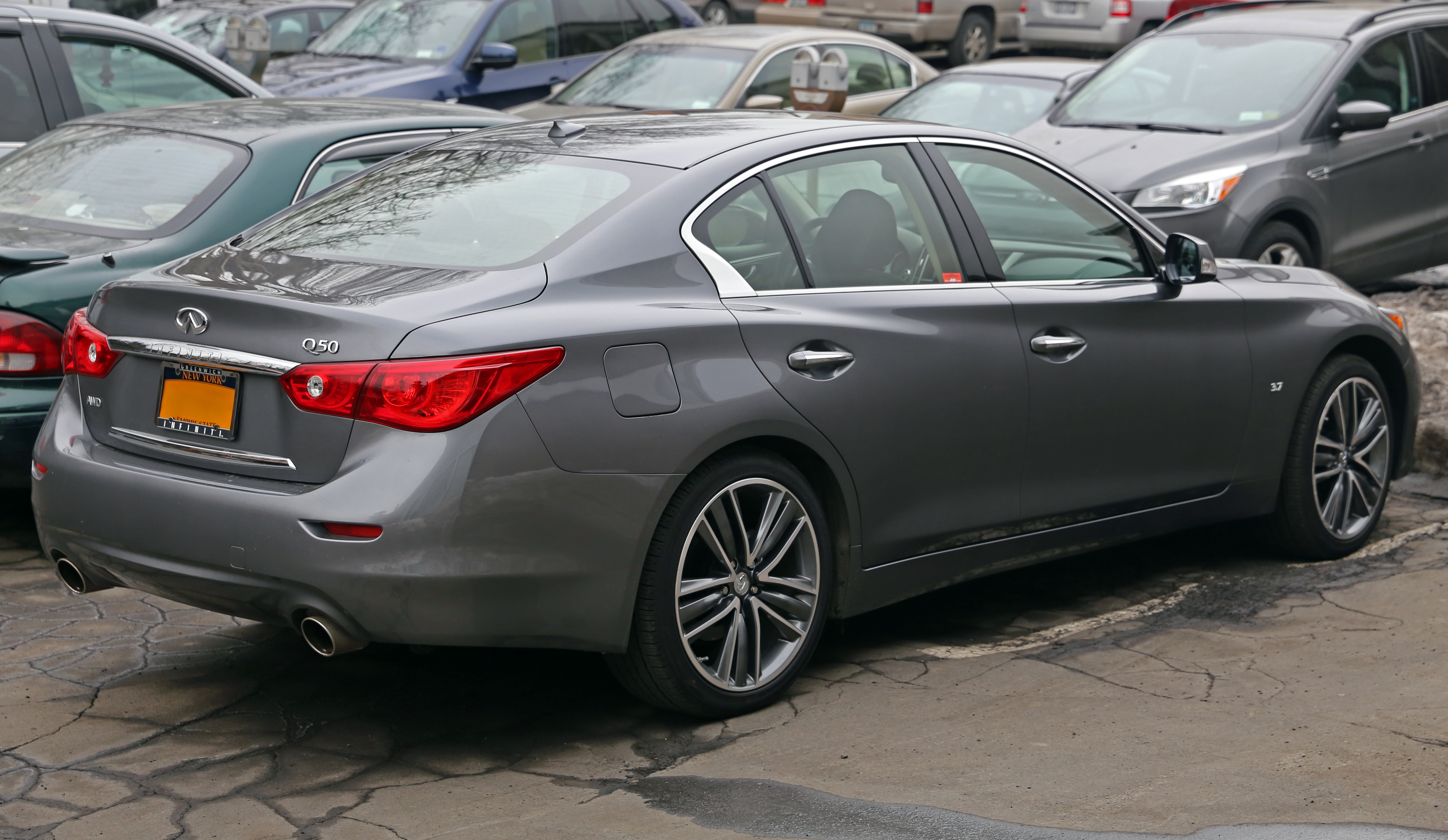
Infiniti Q50 (V37)

Early US and Canada models include 3.7-liter V6 (333PS), 3.5-liter Hybrid (364 PS), each in a choice of rear-wheel drive or Intelligent All-Wheel Drive and in a selection of trim levels, including Sport models.

US models went on sale in August 2013.

Early Canadian models include 3.7-liter V6 (Q50 RWD, Q50 Sport RWD, Q50 Premium AWD, Q50 Premium AWD Navi, Q50 Premium AWD Navi and Deluxe Touring and Tech, Q50 Sport AWD, Q50 Sport AWD Deluxe Touring and Tech) and 3.5-liter Hybrid (Q50 Hybrid Premium RWD, Q50 Hybrid Premium AWD, Q50 Hybrid Sport AWD).

The early European models included 2.2d and hybrid. Infiniti's 2.0 RWD (211 PS) model was added in 2014.

In China the 2014 Q50 3.7L was sold as an imported vehicle until production in China could begin. The 2.0 RWD (211 PS) model and the Q50 Hybrid also joined the line up.

Middle East models was set to go on sale in spring 2014 as 2014 model year vehicles. Early models include 3.7-liter V6 and 3.5-liter Hybrid, both in rear-wheel drive.

Australian models went on sale in February 2014, launching with the 2.2d diesel and 3.5 gasoline hybrid models.

Hong Kong models went on sale as 2014 model year vehicles.

=== 2014 Infiniti Q50 Exclusive Designer Edition (2013–2024) ===
Two specialty versions of the 2014 Infiniti Q50 sedan were produced in association with Gilt City, one designed by Zac Posen and the other designed by Thom Browne, both American fashion designers. The vehicles went on sale on gilt.com December 13, 2013 for $75,000, with a portion of the proceeds benefiting St. Jude Children's Research Hospital.

The Thom Browne 2014 Infiniti Q50 includes a chrome body finish, red, white and blue stripes from the seats to the floor mats and stitching on the steering wheel. It also features a sterling silver ring encircling the gear-shift handle and a luggage set custom designed to fit in the trunk.

Zac Posen's 2014 Infiniti Q50 includes body color fade from silver in front to charcoal in back, and from matte to shine; red-carpet interior color, shagreen handle and shagreen stick with leather piping.

The vehicles were unveiled in New York City.

The two buyers also received a $10,000 Gilt.com shopping credit and a style consultation, a Thom Browne Solid Silver Personal Card Case (Browne version) or a Zac Posen Smartphone Clutch (Posen version).

=== Q50 Hybrid (2014–2018) ===
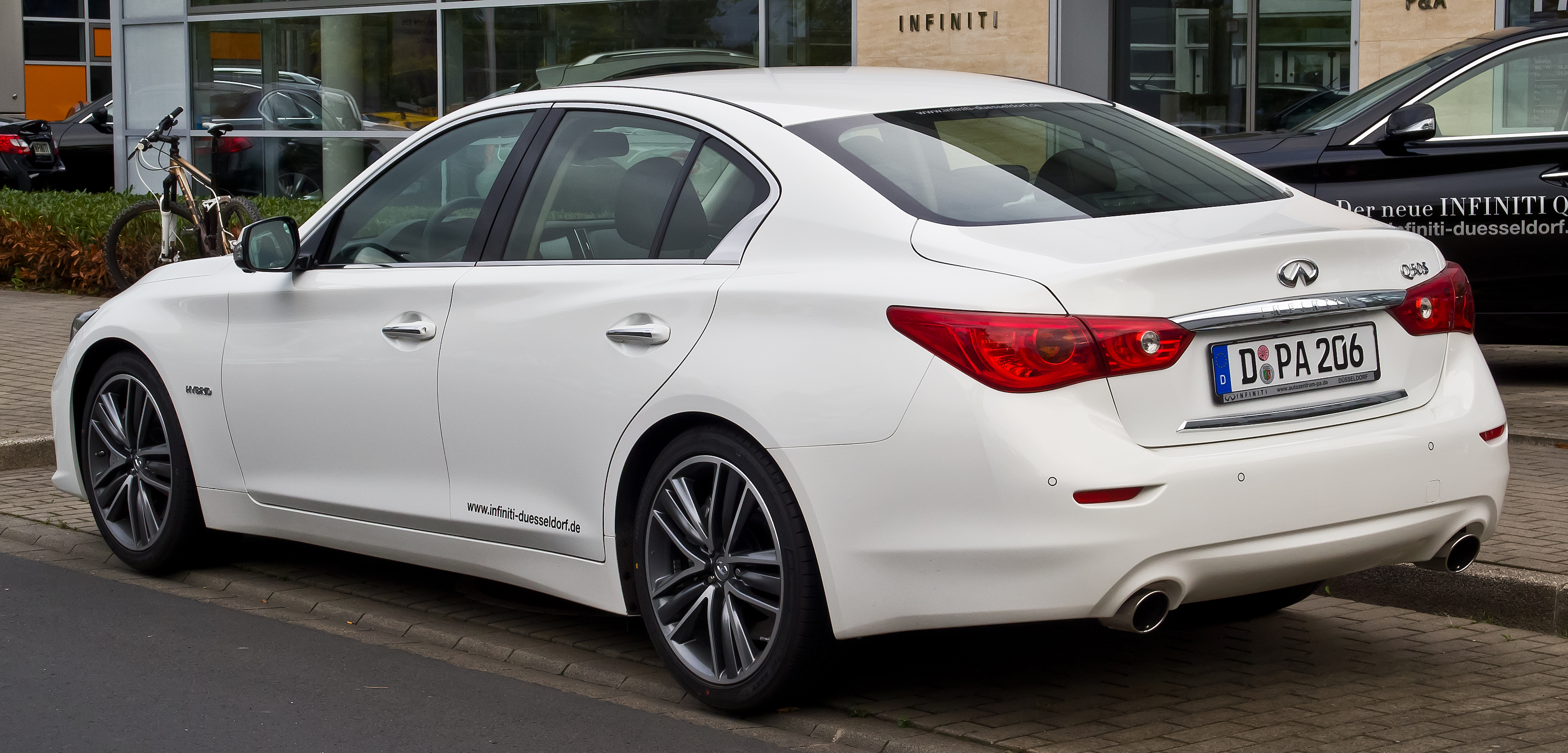
Infiniti Q50 S Hybrid (European model)

Infiniti's Q50 hybrid vehicle was unveiled at the 2013 Shanghai Auto Show. Power for the Q50 Hybrid comes from the 3.5-liter gasoline engine combined with electric motor. Early European models included rear and all-wheel drive forms. Infiniti discontinued the Q50 Hybrid after the 2018 model year.

=== Q50L (2014–2024) ===
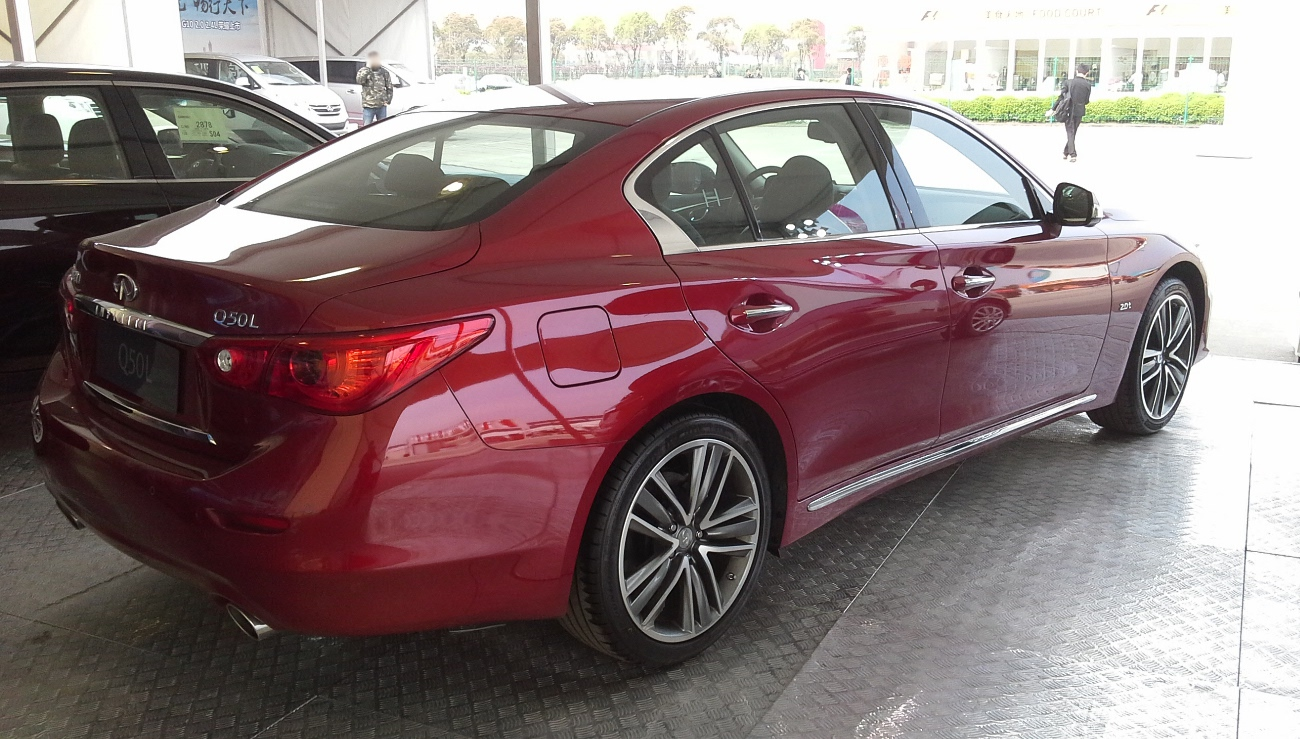
Infiniti Q50 L

The Q50L has a 48 mm (1.9 in) longer wheelbase than the regular Q50 to provide more spacious rear legroom. It is powered by a 2.0-liter turbo engine matched to a 7-speed automatic transmission. Trim levels for the Q50L sold in China are Comfort, Elegant, Sport, Luxury, and Sport Luxury.

The vehicle was unveiled at the 2013 Shanghai Motor Show.

=== Q50 Eau Rouge concept (2014) ===
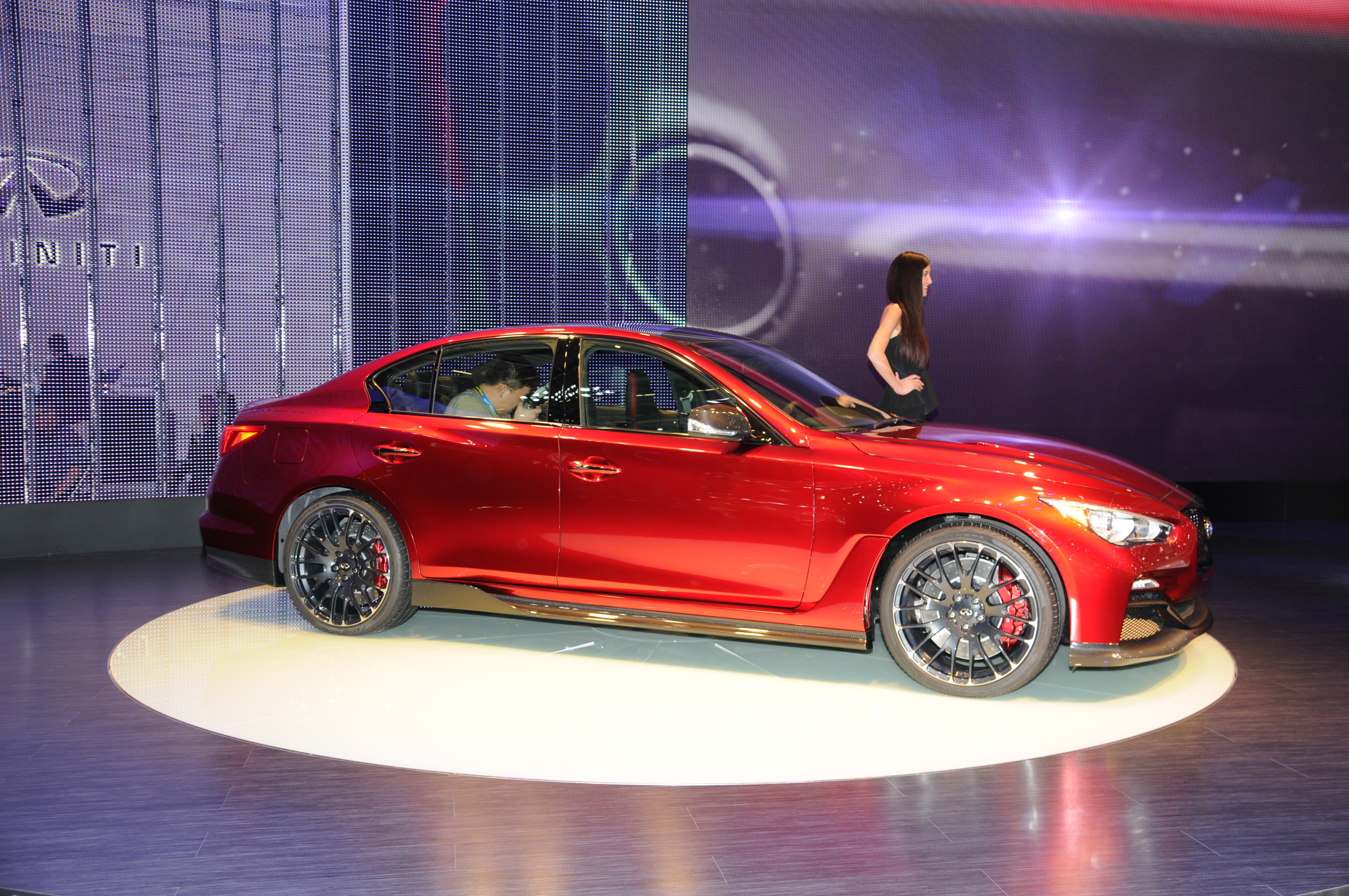
Infiniti Q50 Eau Rouge at the 2014 Geneva Motor Show.

Named for the famous corner at Spa-Francorchamps, the Eau Rouge is a Formula One inspired concept car based on the Q50 premium sports sedan, with aerodynamic styling treatments and design elements influenced by Infiniti's partnership with Infiniti Red Bull Racing. Changes include bespoke carbon fiber bodywork (carbon fiber front splitter, rear diffuser and side sill skirts, carbon fiber roof and door mirror casings), 20-inch lightweight forged alloy wheels, a dual-exit exhaust sports system below a large integrated rear spoiler, 20 mm wider wheel arches, red body color with overlaid tinted clear coat, matching carbon fiber door and center console panes, a high-grip sports steering wheel with Formula One-style paddle-shifters.

The vehicle was unveiled at the 2014 North American International Auto Show.

=== Q50 Eau Rouge prototype (2014) ===
Changes from Q50 Eau Rouge concept included a twin-turbocharged 3,799 cc (232 cu in) (568 PS (418 kW; 560 hp)/600 N⋅m (443 lb⋅ft)) V6 from the Nissan GT-R and a 7-speed automatic transmission and Intelligent AWD from the Infiniti Q70. The transmission and drivelines were compromises due to the inability of Infiniti to fit the rest of the GT-R's drivetrain into the prototype.

The vehicle was unveiled at the 2014 Geneva International Motor Show, followed by the 2014 Goodwood Festival of Speed.

Plans to put the Eau Rouge into production were shelved in January 2015.

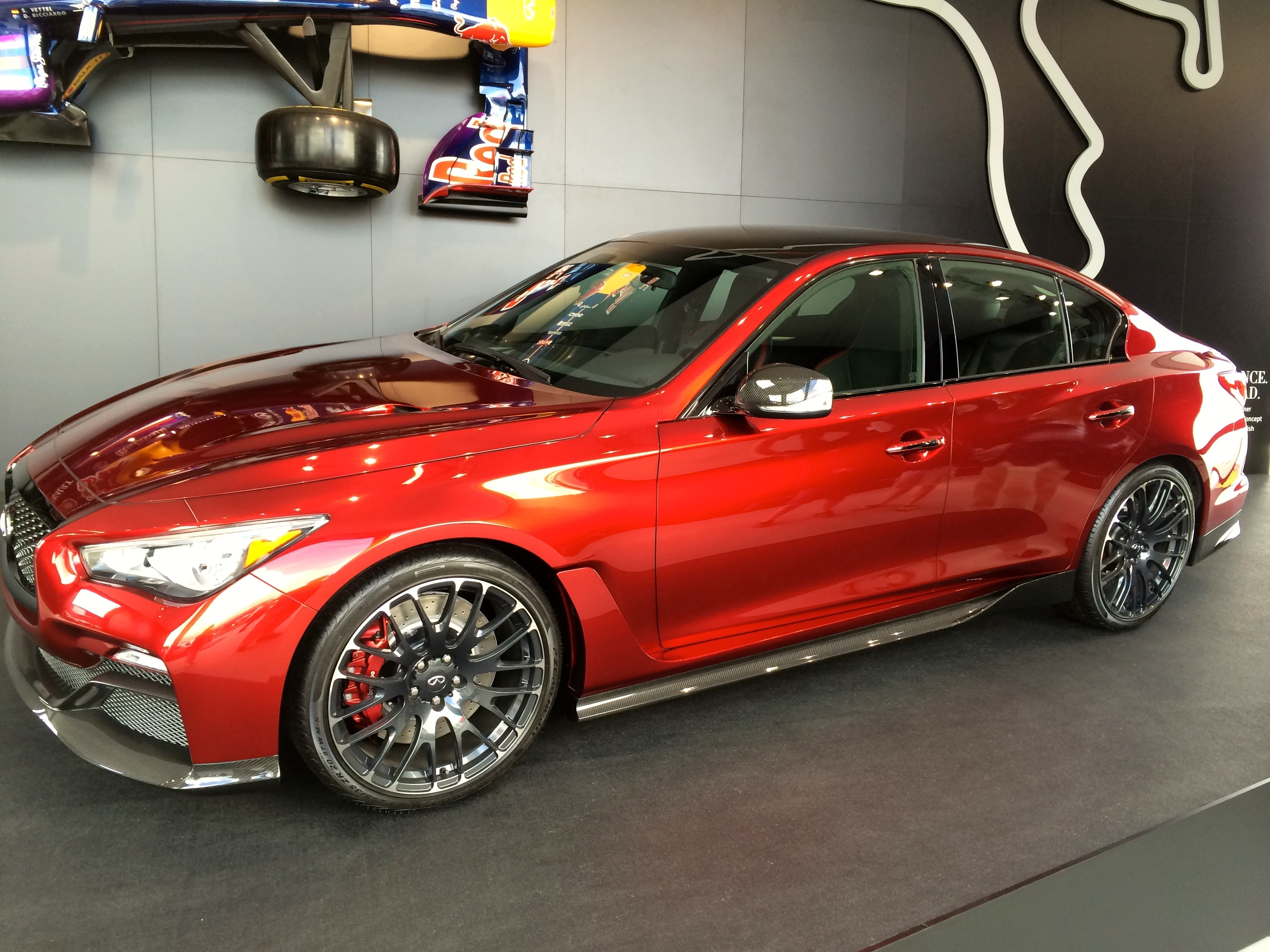
Eau Rouge prototype

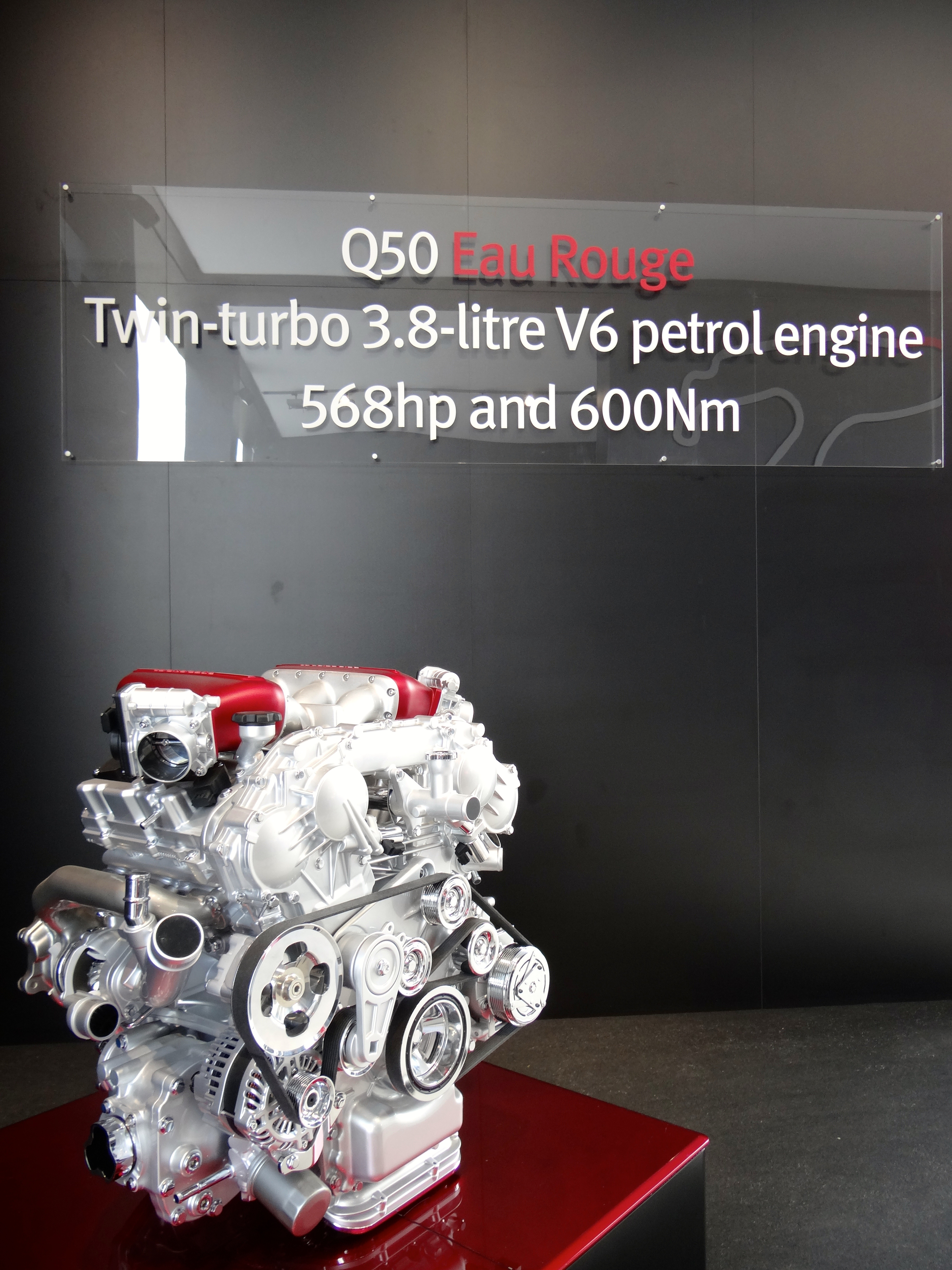
Engine

=== Q50 Sound Studio by Bose (2016) ===
The Q50 Sound Studio by Bose was a limited-edition version for the 2016 model year. It was based on Q50 2.0t and 2.2d (Premium or Sport), and included Advanced Staging Technology digital signal processing circuitry, Centerpoint 2 surround sound, AudioPilot2 Noise Compensation Technology, a navigation system and 14 speakers. This was the first time Bose's Advanced Staging Technology has ever been featured in a car.

UK models went on sale in October 2015 as a 2016 model.

=== Powertrain ===
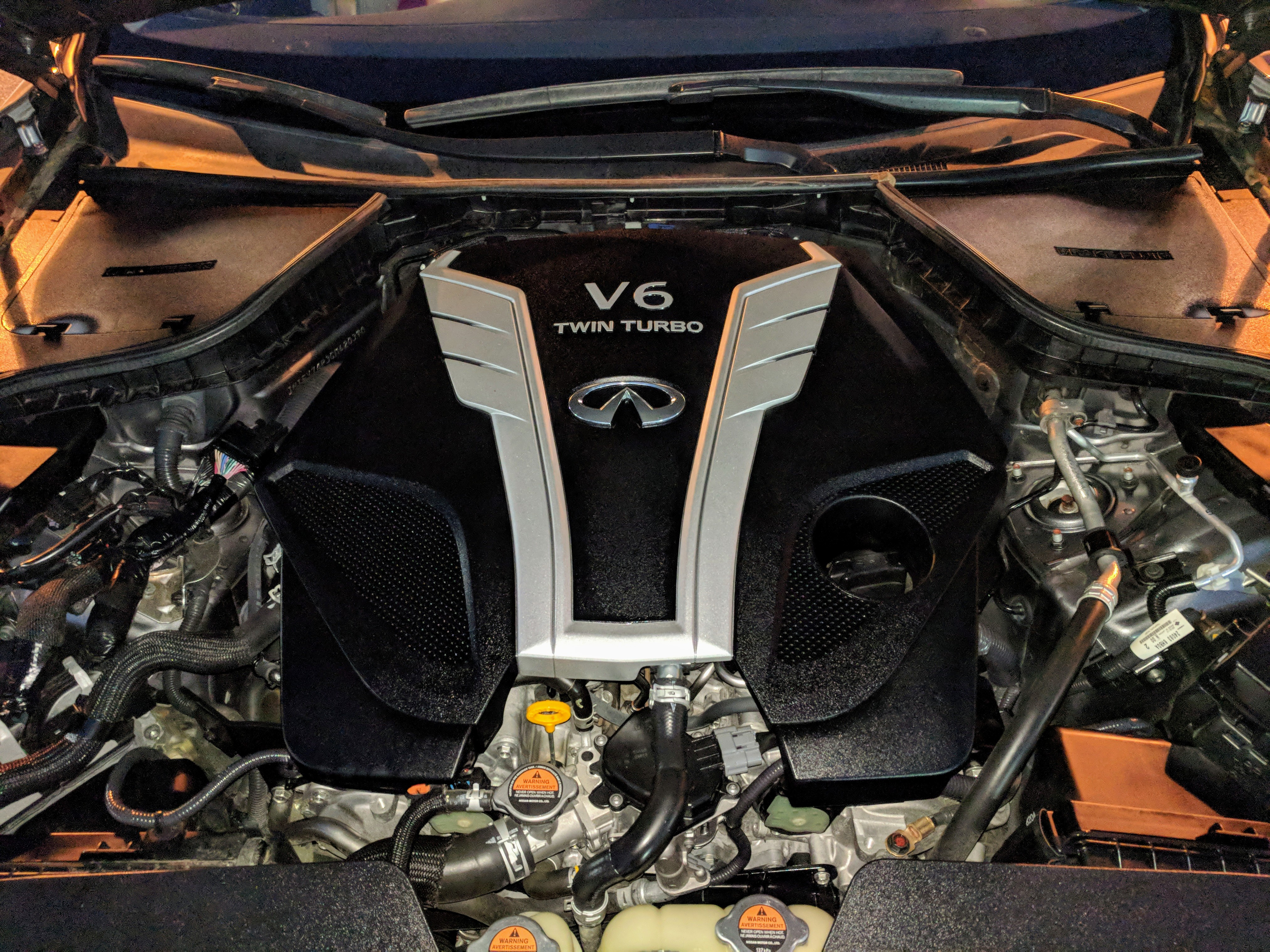
Infiniti Q50 VR30DDTT engine

Gasoline engines
Model	Years	Type/code	Transmission	Power	Torque	Acceleration 0–60 mph (0–97 km/h)	Acceleration 0–100 km/h (0–62 mph)
Gasoline
3.7; 3.7 AWD	2014–2015	3,696 cc (226 cu in) V6; Nissan VQ37VHR	7-speed 7R01 automatic	333 PS (245 kW; 328 hp) at 7,000 rpm	365 N⋅m (269 lb⋅ft) at 5,200 rpm	5.3s (RWD); 5.6s (AWD)	5.5s (RWD); 5.8s (AWD)
2.0t 2.0t AWD	2016–2019	1,991 cc (121 cu in) I4 turbo Mercedes-Benz M 274 DE 20 AL	7-speed 7G-Tronic automatic	211 PS (155 kW; 208 hp) at 5,500 rpm	350 N⋅m (258 lb⋅ft) at 1,250–3,500 rpm	Unknown	7.2s
3.0t 3.0t AWD	2016–2024	2,997 cc (183 cu in) V6; Nissan VR30DDTT	7-speed 7R01 automatic	304 PS (224 kW; 300 hp) at 6,400 rpm	400 N⋅m (295 lb⋅ft) at 1,600–5,200 rpm	5.0s	5.2s
3.0t Red Sport 400; 3.0t Red Sport 400 AWD	2016–2024	2,997 cc (183 cu in) V6; Nissan VR30DDTT	7-speed 7R01 automatic	406 PS (299 kW; 400 hp) at 6,400 rpm	475 N⋅m (350 lb⋅ft) at 1,600–5,200 rpm	4.5s	5.1s
Hybrid
Hybrid; Hybrid AWD	2014–2018	3,498 cc (213 cu in) V6; Nissan VQ35HR	7-speed 7R01 automatic	306 PS (225 kW; 302 hp) at 6,800 rpm	350 N⋅m (258 lb⋅ft) at 5,000 rpm	4.9s (RWD); 5.2s (AWD)	5.1s (RWD); 5.4s (AWD)
Hybrid; Hybrid AWD	2014–2018	Nissan HM34 (electric motor)	7-speed 7R01 automatic	68 PS (50 kW; 67 hp) at 1,650–2,000 rpm	290 N⋅m (214 lb⋅ft) at 1,650 rpm	4.9s (RWD); 5.2s (AWD)	5.1s (RWD); 5.4s (AWD)
Hybrid; Hybrid AWD	2014–2018	combined	7-speed 7R01 automatic	364 PS (268 kW; 359 hp)	546 N⋅m (403 lb⋅ft)	4.9s (RWD); 5.2s (AWD)	5.1s (RWD); 5.4s (AWD)
Diesel
2.2d	2014–2016	2,143 cc (131 cu in) I4 turbo Mercedes-Benz OM 651 22 LA	6-speed manual 7-speed 7G-Tronic automatic	170 PS (125 kW; 168 hp) at 3,200–4,000 rpm	400 N⋅m (295 lb⋅ft) at 1,600–2,800 rpm	Unknown	8.5s/8.7s

=== Safety ===
ANCAP test results* Infiniti Q50 (2014)
Test	Score
Overall	5 /5 stars
Frontal offset	14.76/16
Side impact	16/16
Pole	2/2
Seat belt reminders	3/3
Whiplash protection	Good
Pedestrian protection	Adequate
Electronic stability control	Standard

=== Motorsports ===
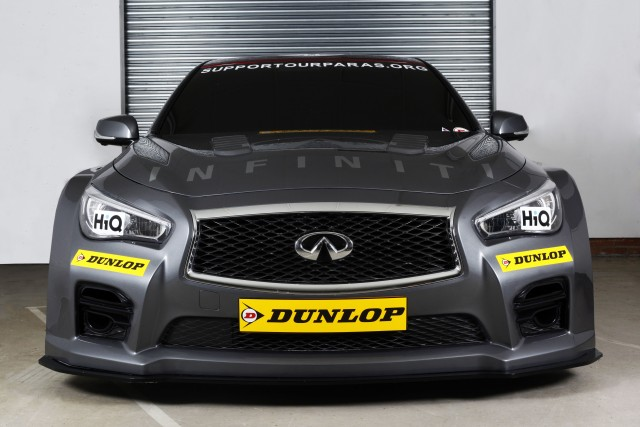
BTCC NGTC Spec Infiniti Q50

On 16 October 2014 it was announced that the Infiniti Q50 would be entering the British Touring Car Championship for the 2015 season under the banner of Support our Paras. At that time, PRO Motorsport announced it would enter two cars in the championship driven by Richard Hawken and Derek Palmer Jr., the son of PRO Motorsport Team Principal Derek Palmer Sr., supporting the charity Support Our Paras through racing, and its long-term goal of developing, training and ensuring an injured Paratrooper graduates through the racing ranks to pilot an Infiniti Support Our Paras Racing car.

=== Production ===
Production of Q50 at Tochigi production plant began on 14 May 2013. Production of the Chinese models of Q50L sedan at Xiangyang plant in Hubei Province, China also began in 2014.

The production of 2.0-liter turbocharged gasoline 4-cylinder developed by Daimler at the Nissan Decherd Powertrain Plant in Franklin County, Tennessee (US) began 26 June 2014. The engine is also used by Daimler's Mercedes-Benz C-Class at Mercedes-Benz U.S. International in Alabama.

Production of European models of Q50 began in 2015.

The Infiniti Q50 audio system was designed by Bose.

The Q50 Eau Rouge production was cancelled due to high cost.

=== Marketing ===
As part of the Q50 Eau Rouge Prototype launch, the #InfinitiRaceFace campaign was launched on 23 September 2014, awarding the grand prize winner the opportunity to attend the 2014 Formula One United States Grand Prix race, and also the chance to ride with Sebastian Vettel in the Infiniti Q50 Eau Rouge Prototype for a lap in downtown Austin on 29 October 2014.

=== 2016 model year update ===
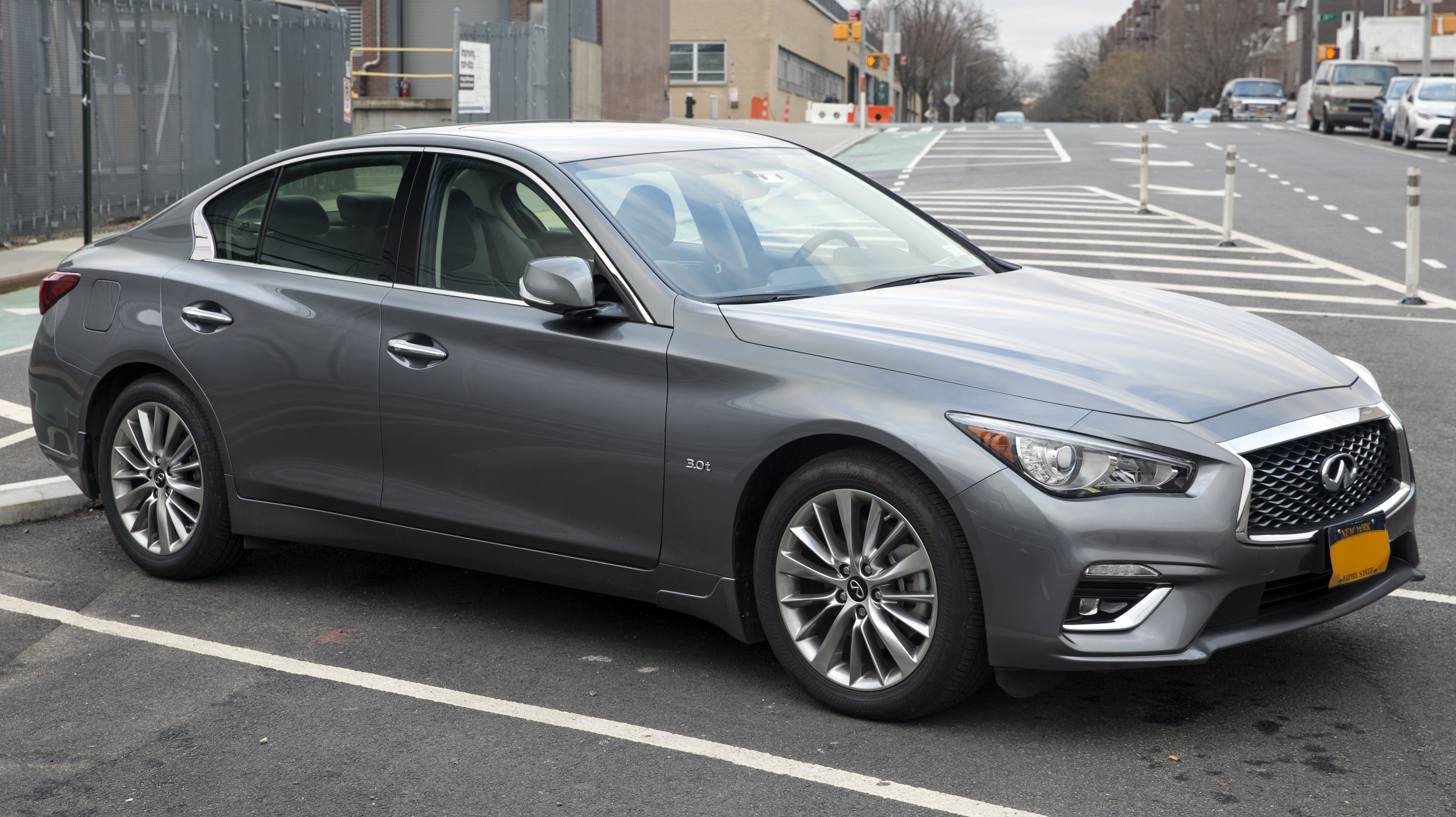
2019 Infiniti Q50 3.0t Luxe

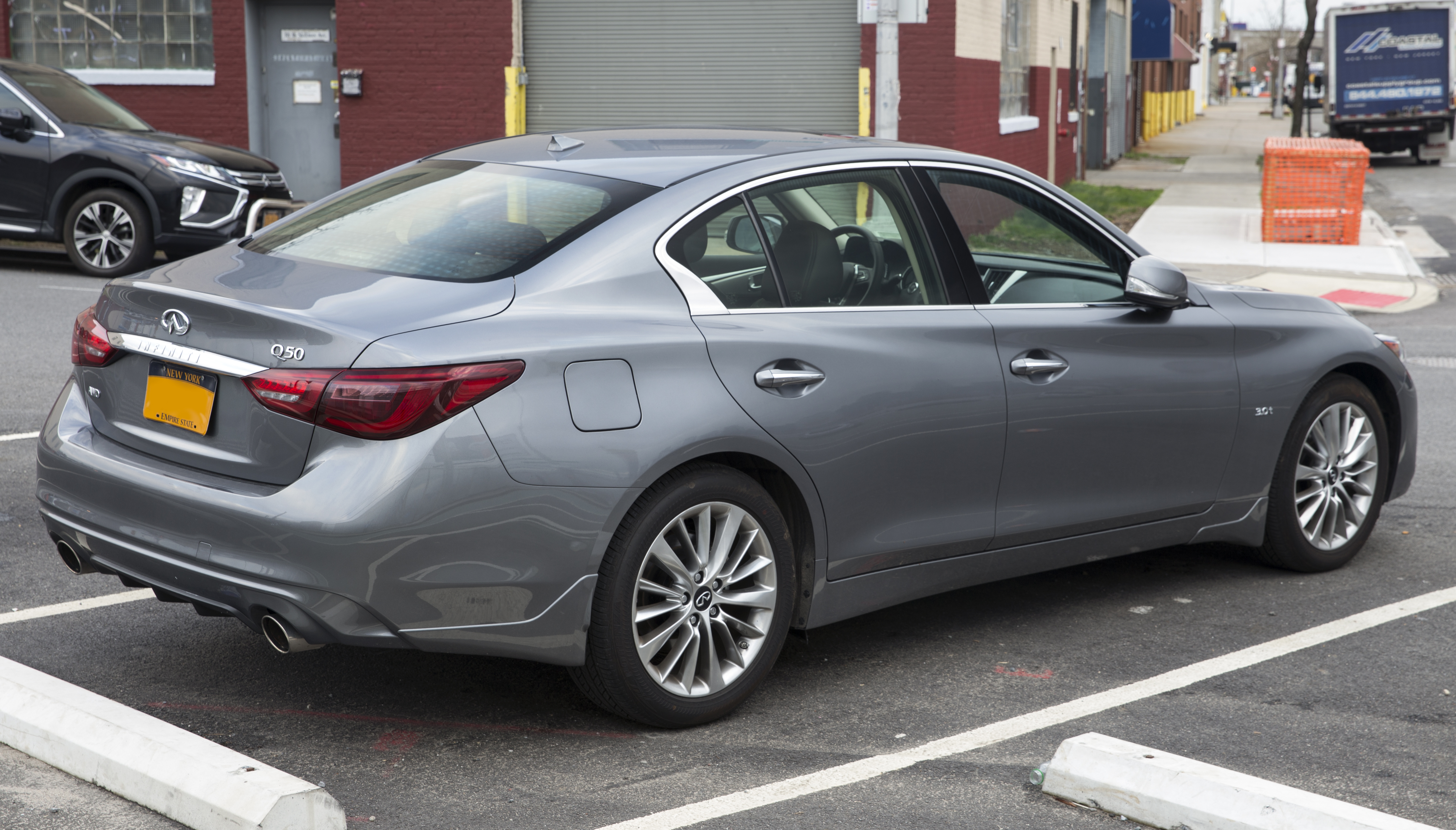

Unveiled at the 2016 Chicago Auto Show (Q50 2.0t, Q50 3.0t, Q50 Red Sport 400), the 2016 Q50 featured several updates, including the introduction of second-generation Direct Adaptive Steering with advanced levels of steering feel and feedback, introduction of Dynamic Digital Suspension, Drive Mode Selector with Personal mode, standard RACK Electronic Power Steering on 3.0t models, revised suspension settings provide an improved balance between confident handling and a more comfortable ride.

The Q50 Red Sport 400 is based on Q50 3.0t (405PS), with sport styled front fascia, sport brakes with 4-piston front and 2-piston rear calipers, sport-tuned Digital Dynamic Suspension, new rack-based Electronic Power Steering or optional Direct Adaptive Steering, leather-appointed sport seats, aluminum-accented pedals, solid magnesium paddle shifters, Exclusive Red Sport 400 brushed-finish exhaust tips, Exclusive Red Sport 400 19-inch sport aluminum-alloy wheels (staggered for RWD models), chrome finished red 'S' exterior sport badging on the trunk and front fenders.

Early models included 2.0t, 2.0t AWD, Hybrid, Hybrid AWD, 3.0t (304/405PS, 304PS models available in Middle East), Hybrid, and 2.2d. US models of Q50 Red Sport 400 went on sale as 2016 model year vehicles, including Q50 Red Sport 400, Q50 Red Sport 400 AWD. In 2019, Infiniti was testing some of its current models at the Spaceport America desert test tracks, such as its Q50 sports sedan and Q60 sports coupe.

=== Discontinuation and revival ===
In August 2024, Infiniti announced the cancellation of the Q50 in their North American lineup, with 2024 confirmed to be its final model year for U.S and Canada, after eleven years on sale due to slow sales. The cancellation of the Q50 led to Infiniti to become a brand selling only SUVs. However, the Q50, along with its sister model, the Nissan Skyline, is expected to return for the 2028 model year with an optional manual transmission and a twin-turbocharged V6, which would mark Infiniti's re-entry into the compact executive sedan class.

== Sales ==
Year	US	Canada	China
2013	17,816	1,272	
2014	36,899	3,242	
2015	43,874	3,295	
2016	44,007	2,969	
2017	40,739	2,413	
2018	34,763	2,576	
2019	25,987	1,871	
2020	16,533	1,040	
2021	13,896	1,001	
2022	4,781	535	
2023	6,201	564	2,260
2024	5,428	864	57
2025	529	47	
