= Infiniti =

Japanese luxury car brand, a subsidiary of Nissan

- Type: Division
- Industry: Automotive
- Founded: November 8, 1989; 37 years ago
- Headquarters: Nishi-ku, Yokohama
- Area served: North America; China; Middle East; Taiwan; International markets
- Key people: Bill Bruce (Founding General Manager); Craig Keeys (Group Vice President Infiniti Americas) Jose Roman (Senior Vice President And Global Head)
- Products: Luxury cars Performance vehicles
- Services: Financial services
- Parent: Nissan
- Website: infiniti.com

Infiniti (インフィニティ; IPA: [iɰ̃ɸiniti]) (stylized in all caps) is the luxury car division of the Japanese automaker Nissan. The brand began on November 8, 1989, initially in North America. The marketing network for Infiniti vehicles included dealers in over 50 countries in the 2010s. As of 2020, there were 25 markets served by new car dealers, primarily North America, China, Taiwan, and the Middle East.

According to Nissan, the Infiniti logo is a stylized representation of a road extending to the horizon—and of Mount Fuji, reflecting its Japanese origins.

== History ==
=== The beginning ===
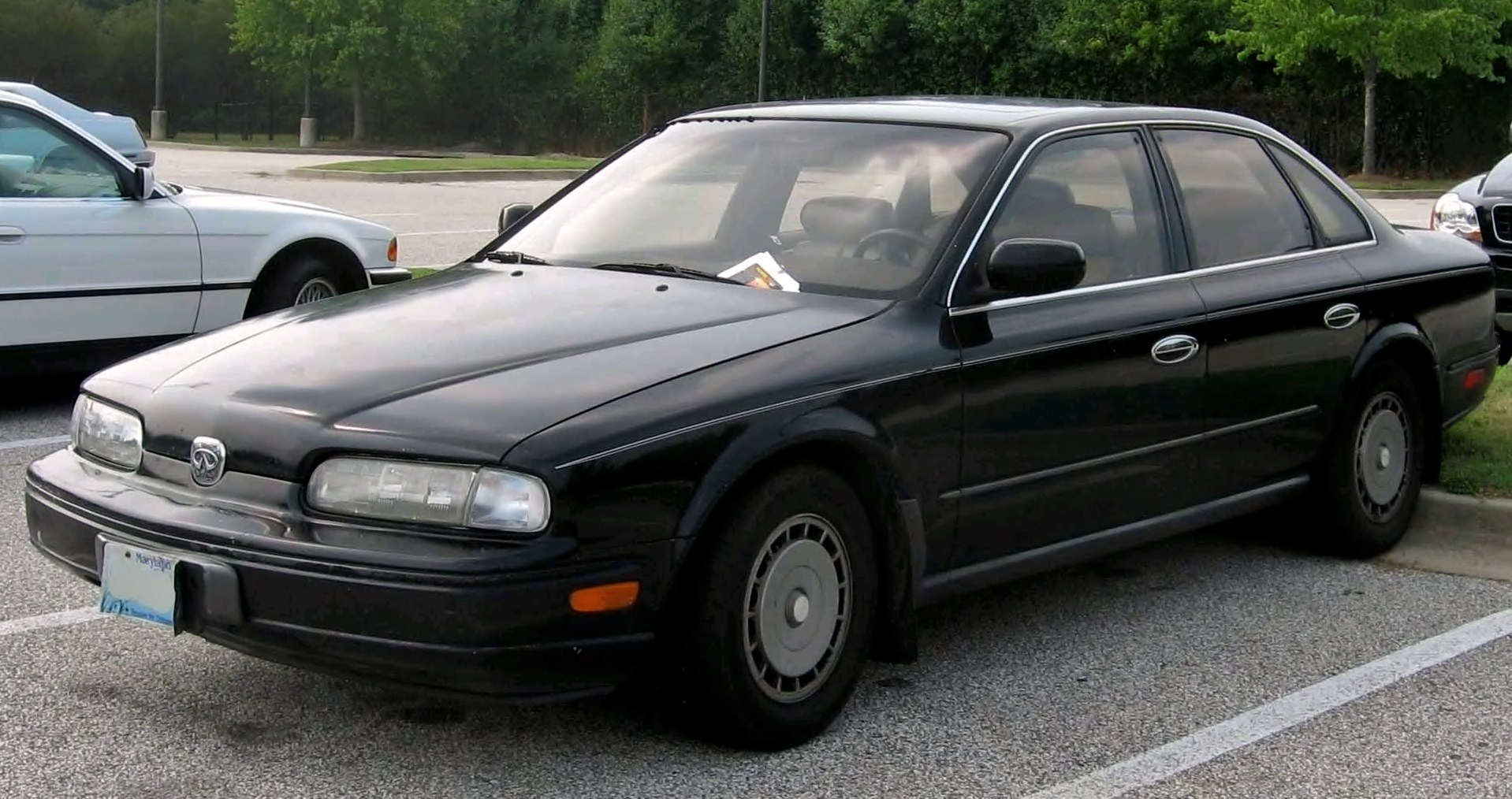
1989–1993 Infiniti Q45

The Infiniti brand was introduced in the United States in 1989 to target the premium vehicle segments in the United States that would not have otherwise fit in with Nissan's mainstream offering, and partially influenced by the Plaza Accord of 1985. The brand was created around the same time automaker rivals Toyota and Honda developed their Lexus and Acura premium brands, respectively. As the Japanese government invoked voluntary export restraints, it became more effective for automakers to export fewer but more expensive cars to the U.S. market.

The marque launched with two models: the Q45 and the M30 that were previously sold at Japanese Nissan Store dealership networks. The Q45 was based on the all new second-generation JDM Nissan President on a five millimeter shorter wheelbase platform at 2,875 mm (113.2 in). Starting with model year 1992, the wheelbase matched the President's wheelbase at 2880 mm (113.4 in). The Q45 included a 278 hp (207 kW; 282 PS) V8 engine, four wheel steering, and active suspension system offered on the first-generation Q45t. The car's features would have made it competitive in the full-sized "luxury" segment against the Mercedes S-Class, BMW 7 Series, Jaguar XJ and Cadillac Fleetwood.

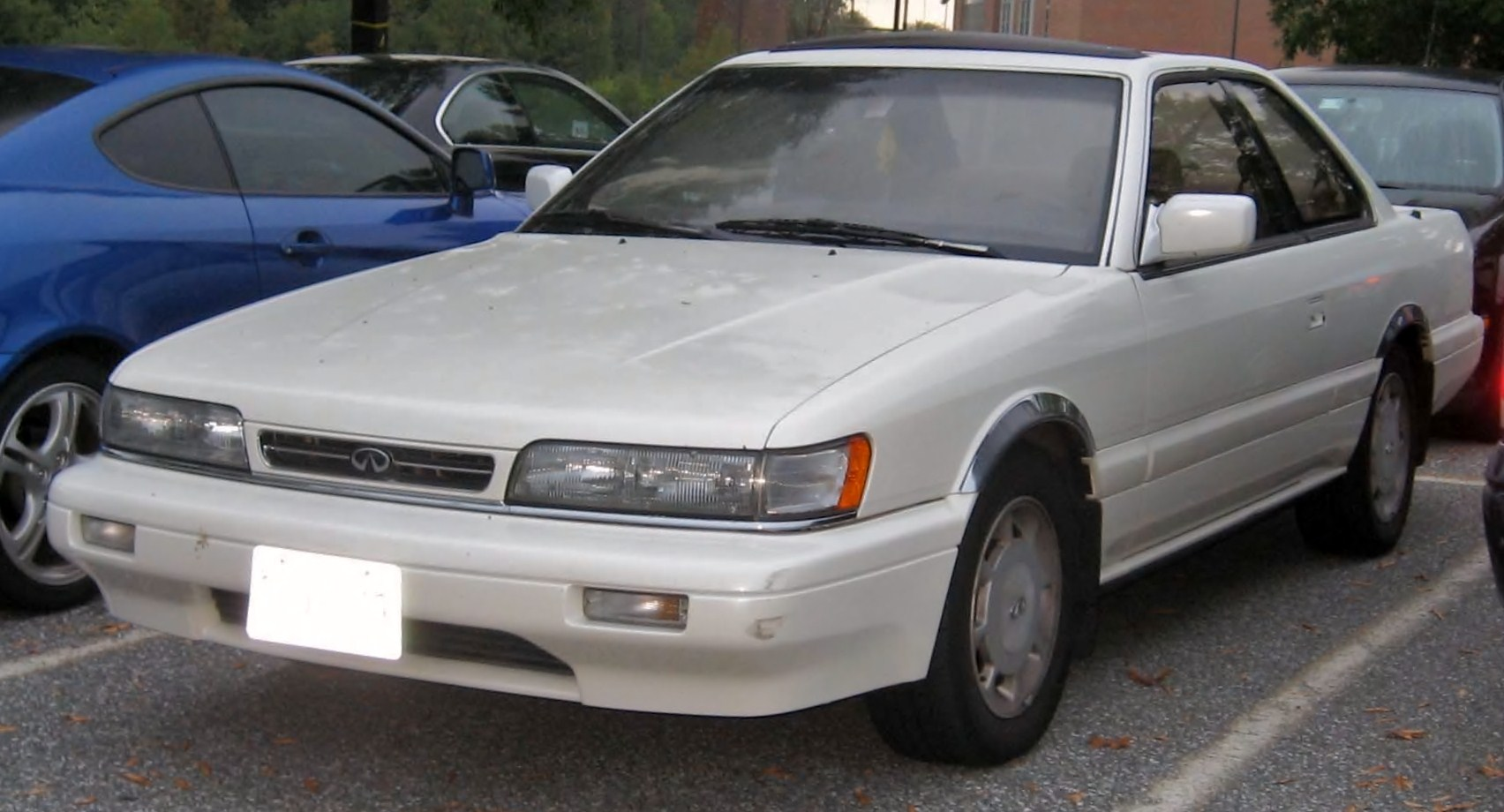
1990 Infiniti M30

A second model was introduced in November 1989, the two-door M30, a badge engineered Nissan Leopard. It remained in production for three years as an alternative to the Lexus SC. The powertrain was the VG30E 162 hp (121 kW; 164 PS) engine and an automatic transmission. The M30 coupe was underpowered for its stock weight of 3,333 lb (1,512 kg). The M30 convertible weighed even more, due to the required body and chassis reinforcements. The M30 looked almost nothing like the larger Q45, and the interior was almost completely different.

Infiniti did not offer a mid-luxury sedan to match the first Japanese luxury sedan introduced to North America, the Acura Legend, which was later joined by the Lexus GS. Infiniti's first offering in the entry-level luxury segment was the Infiniti J30, which had to compete with the revised 1992 Lexus ES and was unsuccessful owing to its small interior and unusual styling; it was succeeded in 1996 by the Infiniti I series, introduced previously in April 1995, related to the Nissan Maxima, and in 2002 by the Infiniti G35.

Infiniti's global network includes over 230 dealers in 15 countries.

=== 1990s ===
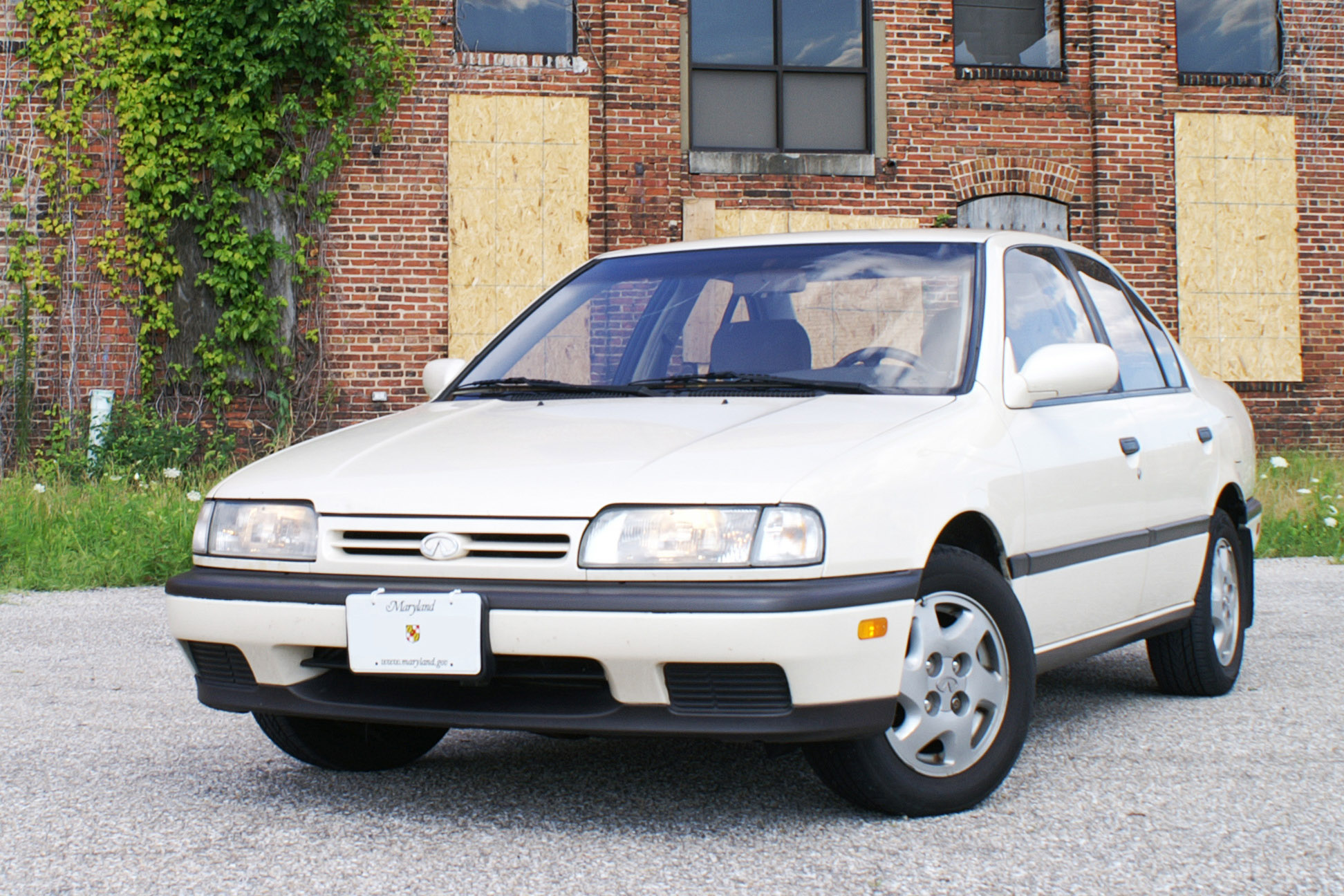
1990 Infiniti G20

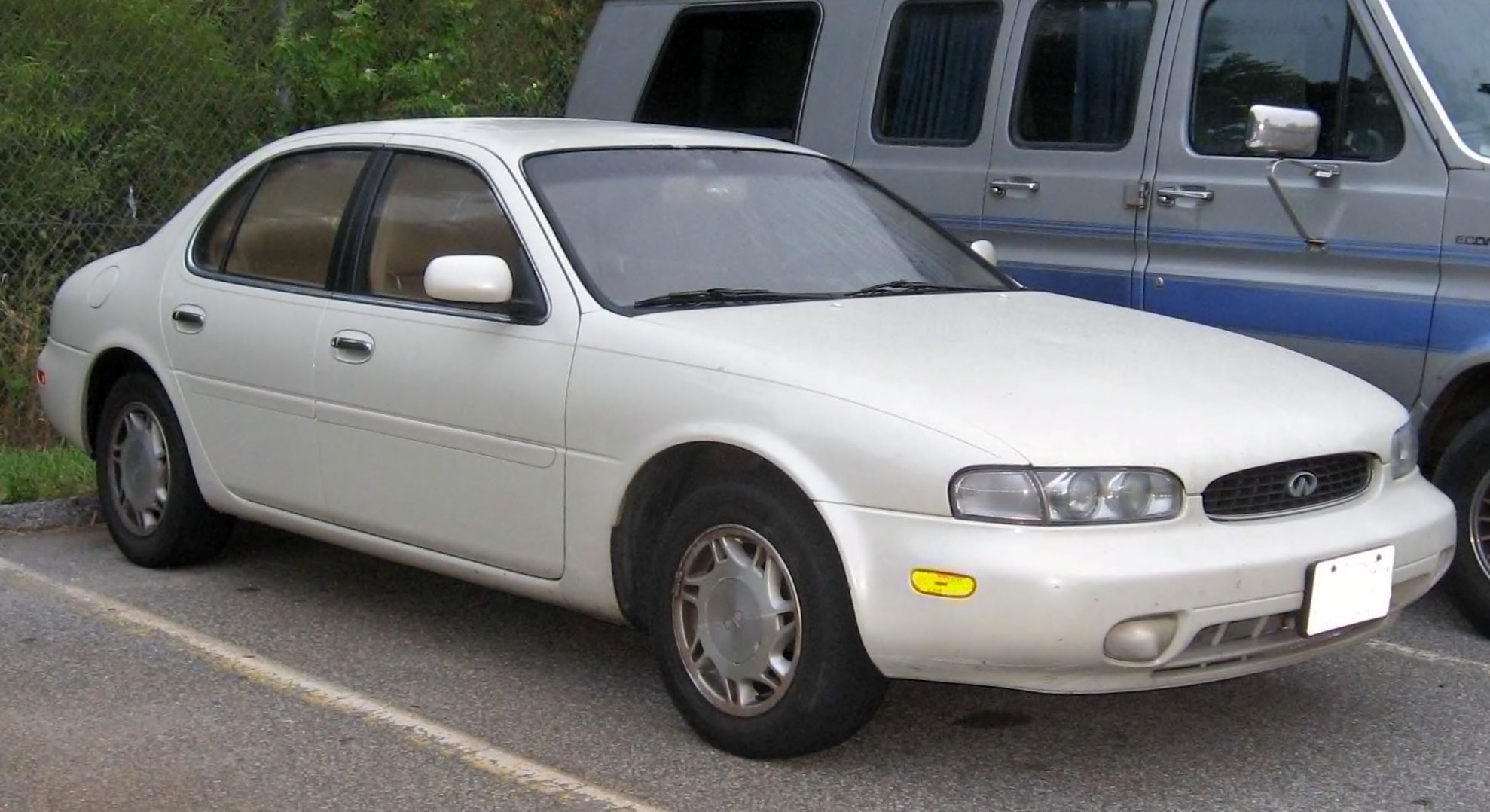
1992 Infiniti J30

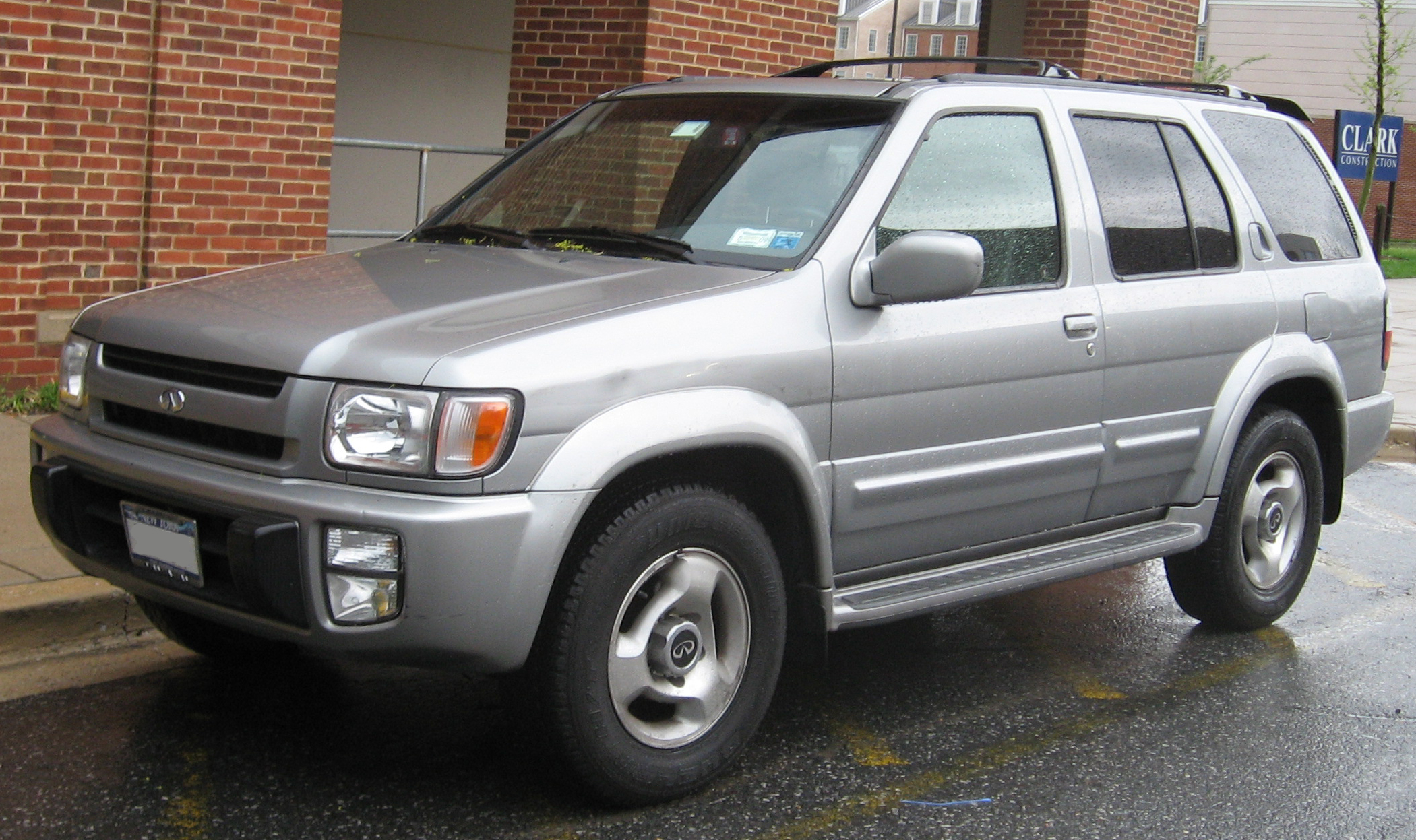
1997–2000 Infiniti QX4

In September 1990, Infiniti introduced a third model, the Infiniti G20, derived from the compact and European-focused Nissan Primera.

In 1992 for the 1993 model year, Infiniti introduced a four-door coupé J30 with only one engine option, the 210 hp (157 kW; 213 PS) VG30DE. This engine was from the 222 hp (166 kW; 225 PS) 300ZX, the JDM Nissan Cedric, Nissan Gloria and the Nissan Cima, and was the North American version of the third generation JDM Nissan Leopard.

Infiniti sales were slow. The company's initial campaign aimed to bring about brand awareness with Zen-influenced spots that focused on nature and tranquility, without showing the actual cars. Designers decided not to adorn the interiors with wood accents and chrome brightwork, opting instead for a monochrome, organic and rounded surface appearance, focusing on padded leather and vinyl throughout. Some buyers had faux wood appliques added to areas surrounding the center console and around the interior door handles. The only item that had a bright appearance was the centrally installed analog clock in all models, a design that is currently maintained by the designers.

By the mid-1990s, Infiniti was lagging behind Lexus and Acura in sales. The Q45 had retreated considerably from its focused, taut rendition of a sporty full-size luxury sedan, having become a barely recognizable, ponderously handling sedan that earned the nickname "The Japanese Lincoln". In the summer of 1998, Infiniti revived the G20, based on the JDM Nissan Primera, a compact sport sedan. The second generation G20 was marketed as a competitor to European entry-level luxury sport sedans, but it now weighed more than the first generation version. Because Infiniti continued to use the SR20DE four-cylinder engine and compact size, it fell short of sales expectations. The G20 was also marketed primarily to the wrong demographic, that being middle-aged professional women, and as such it was not as popular new as its main competition, the similarly priced Acura Integra.

In late 1996, Infiniti released the QX4, modifying and adding premium accommodations to the Nissan Pathfinder, becoming one of the first luxury car manufacturers to offer a mid-size premium SUV.

Infiniti replaced the J30 mid-sized rear drive sedan with the second-generation JDM Nissan Cefiro, giving it the North American designation "I30" in 1996. It offered one engine, the 193 PS (142 kW; 190 hp) VQ30DE with front wheel drive shared with the Maxima. The I30 was redesigned for the 2000 model year, featuring an increase in power to 231 PS (170 kW; 227 hp). Infiniti made further changes to the I30's appearance and performance in mid-2001, upgrading the engine to the more powerful 259 PS (190 kW; 255 hp) VQ35DE; this inspired a name change to the vehicle, which became the I35. Sales and the brand, bereft of an image or a following, floundered.

=== 2000s ===
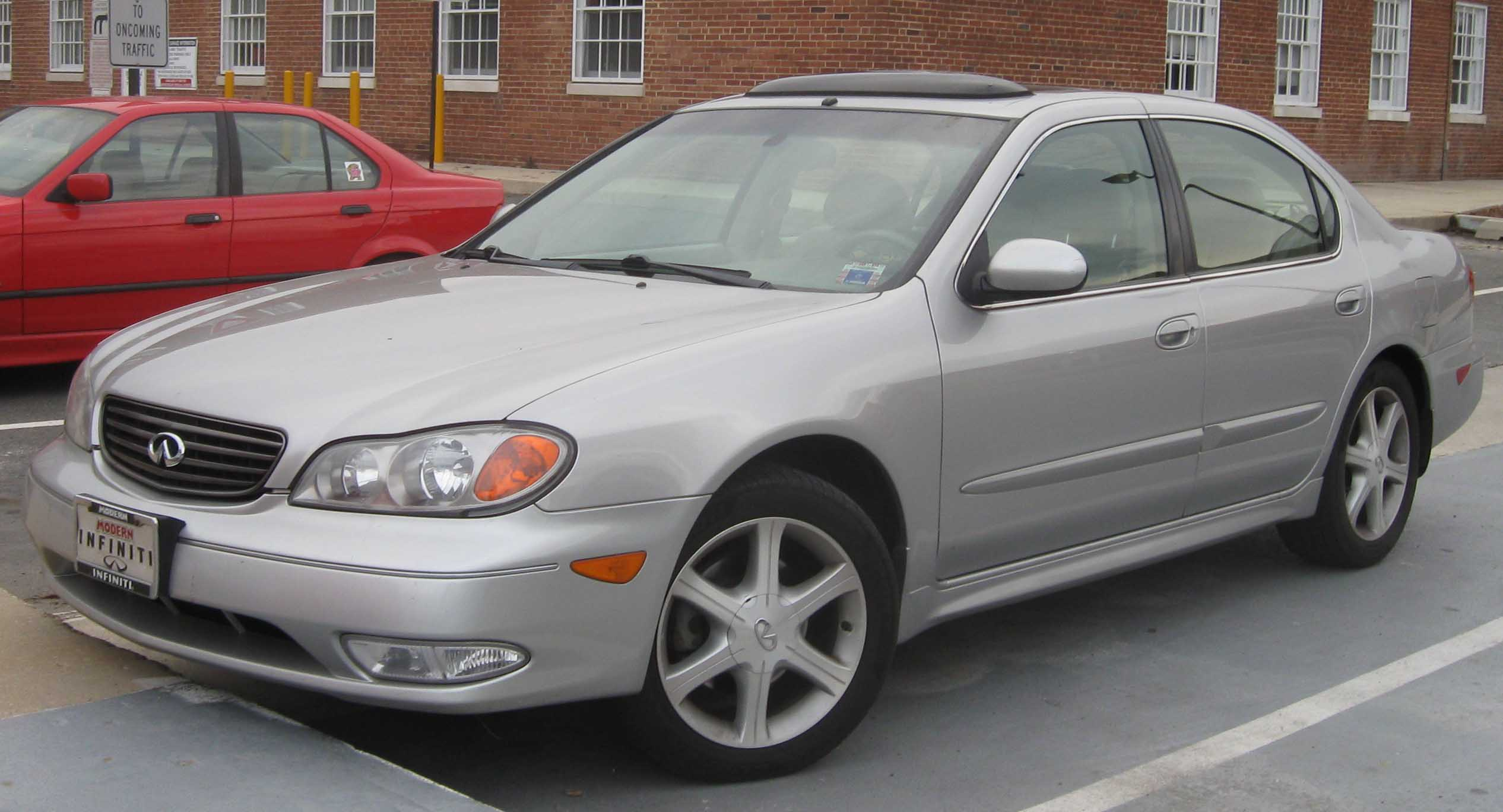
2001–2004 Infiniti I35

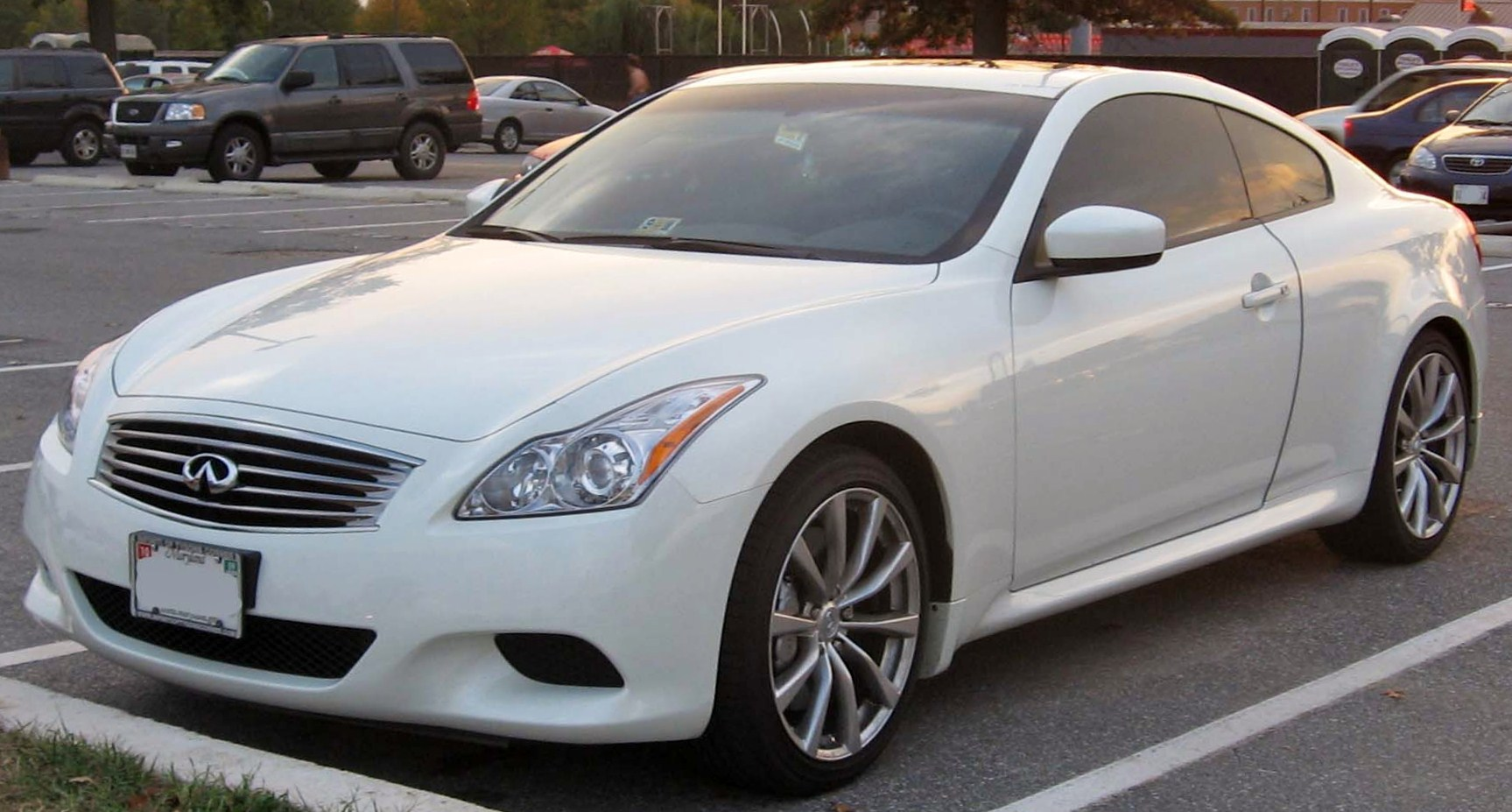
2008 Infiniti G37 Sport

By 2000, large Japanese companies were feeling the effect of the Japanese asset price bubble, and the reduced desirability of Infinitis led to it facing extinction. The company rededicated itself to developing a dynamic and powerful line-up of sporty luxury cars. This coincided with parent company Nissan entering into an alliance with Renault under the direction of Carlos Ghosn and the Nissan Revival Plan. Car and Driver reported that Infiniti executives invited members of the motoring press to a meeting where they "swore never again to take their eyes off BMW." Although this effort began with a completely redesigned Q45 flagship for the 2002 model year in early 2001, it was the G35 that helped improve Infiniti sales by 2003. In Japan, Nissan had a well established reputation with premium level performance sedans after Nissan acquired the Prince Motor Company and integrated the Nissan Skyline, Nissan Laurel and Nissan Gloria, originally Prince vehicles, in 1966–1968. A sports sedan replacing its Nissan Primera-based predecessor (the G20), the Nissan Skyline-based Infiniti G35, was successful after it was voted Motor Trend Car of the Year in 2003.

The release of the sport-tuned FX35/45 crossover that same year piggybacked on the G35's success. The FX used the same components as the G35 sport coupe and was designed for American tastes. It combined good handling and performance with station wagon-like versatility and all-weather capability. In 2004, Infiniti added an all-wheel drive version of the G35 sports sedan to compete with similar all-wheel drive sports sedans from Audi and BMW. Infiniti also introduced a larger SUV to compete with the Toyota Land Cruiser/Lexus LX470. This was the 2004 Infiniti QX56 based on the U.S. market Nissan Armada.

Nissan Motors President and CEO, Carlos Ghosn, developed a business strategy to break Infiniti away from its Nissan roots. The G series helped re-define Infiniti as the "Japanese BMW", as it was aimed directly at the BMW 3 Series of sedans and coupes. The M35/M45 garnered acclaim from the automotive press, winning an eight-car comparison test in Car and Driver, and the model was named the best luxury sedan by Consumer Reports. The M45 model featured the same engine as the Q45, and the M45 became the flagship model after the Q45 was discontinued. The Infiniti M (2002–2005) and the Infiniti G (starting in 2002) were known in Japan as the Nissan Gloria and the Nissan Skyline.

In November 2006 for the 2007 model year a redesigned version of the G35 sedan was launched, followed in August 2007 by a new version of the company's G coupe, the G37. The coupe was first unveiled at the New York International Auto Show in April 2007. Also released in (December) 2007 was new Infiniti EX35 compact crossover, Infiniti's entry into the compact luxury crossover market. The EX shared the G35's 3.5-liter, 306 hp (228 kW), V6 engine.

Carlos Ghosn unveiled Infiniti's arrival in Europe at the 2008 Geneva Motor Show. The official launch was late 2008, and was phased over a two-year period across 21 European countries. Four models are offered in Europe: the next generation of the Infiniti FX37 and Infiniti FX50 performance SUV, the Infiniti G37, the Infiniti G37 coupe, and the Infiniti EX37 crossover. Infiniti Europe's headquarters are in Rolle, Switzerland.

=== 2010s ===
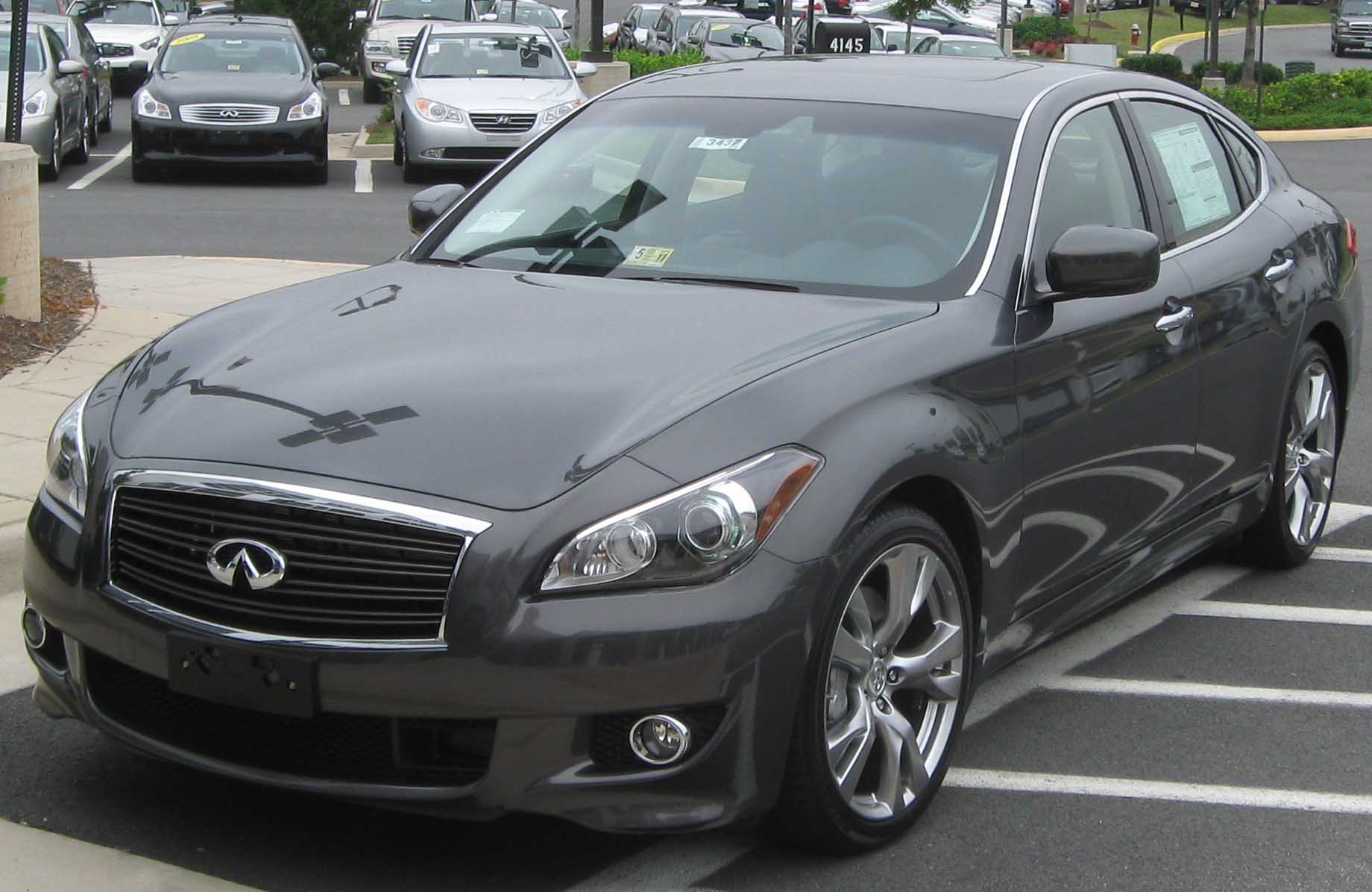
Infiniti M56

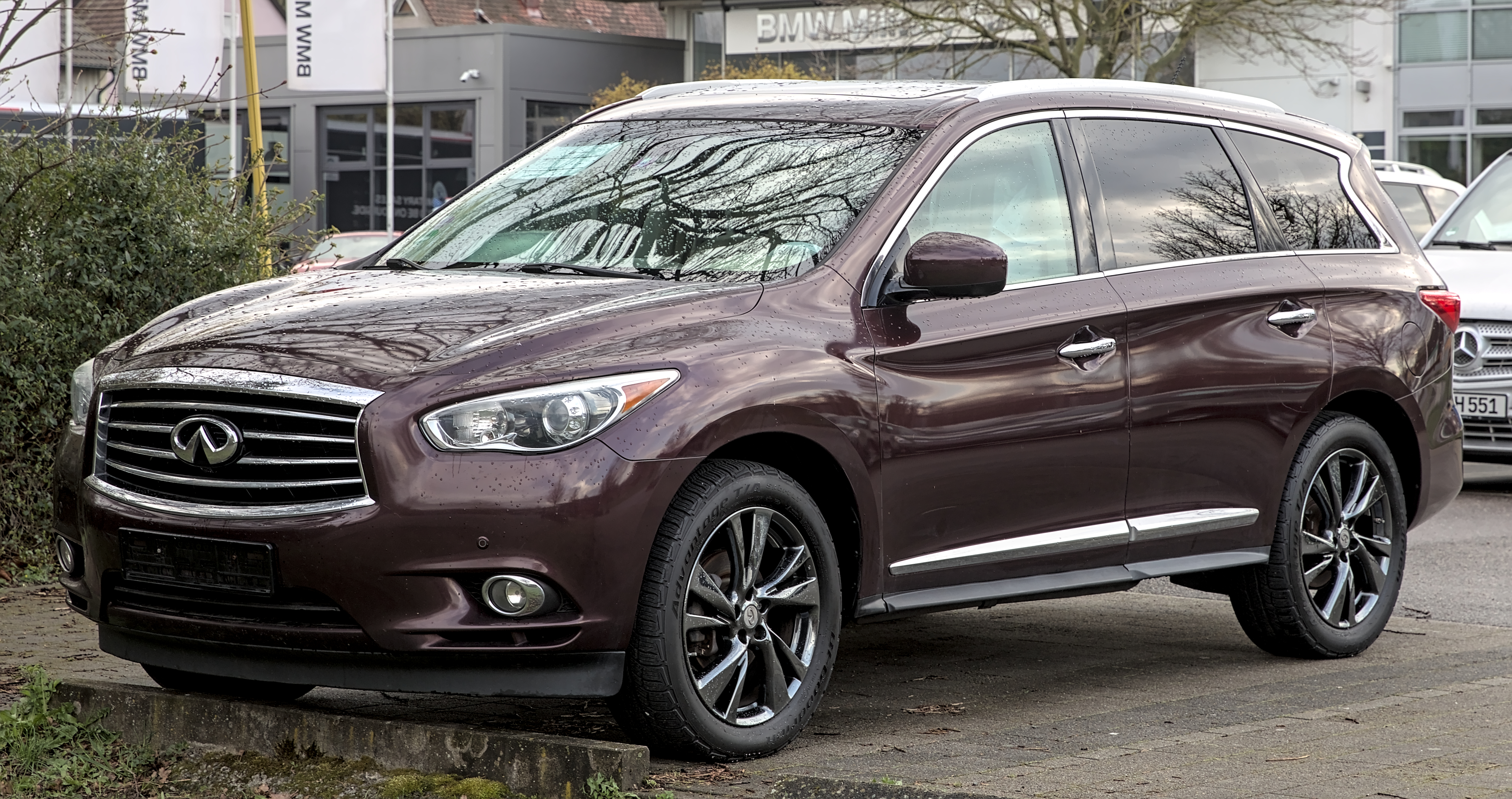
Infiniti JX35

Carlos Ghosn unveiled the Infiniti M at a hotel in Los Angeles. It shares the VQ37VHR from the Infiniti G, and Nissan 370Z. Featured are new powertrains: the 5.6 L V8 (VK56VD) with VVEL, Gasoline direct injection, the Nissan-Renault V9X Engine V6 Turbo Diesel (only for Europe), and the newly developed hybrid that includes one electric motor and two clutches to allow the gas engine and electric motor to drive the rear wheels simultaneously. The lithium-ion battery pack was first displayed in the Essence concept car.

At the 2010 Geneva Motor Show, Infiniti launched a new powertrain for Europe, with the new V9X Engine developed by the Renault-Nissan Alliance. The new engine is used in the Infiniti FX, Infiniti EX, and the new Infiniti M. The new Infiniti M made its European debut at the show.

In August 2010 Infiniti unveiled its new performance division named Infiniti Performance Line, or IPL. Soon thereafter in 2011, Infiniti chose to sponsor the Renault engines for Red Bull Racing for the 2011 Formula One season.

As of 2011, the G Series (consisting of the sedan, coupe, and convertible) accounted for 60% of sales. This was attributed to their SUVs (including crossovers) which were seen as aimed at the narrowest of niches, a lost opportunity as SUVs were popular in the U.S. market. In contrast, at archrival Lexus, SUVs contributed half of the sales volume. In 2011, Infiniti sales fell, while other import luxury vehicles were doing well. Furthermore, Infiniti's performance over practicality emphasis has resulted in its crossovers and SUVs faring poorly among women compared to offerings from Acura and Lexus.

Nissan announced the return of front-wheel drive to the Infiniti lineup on August 30, 2011, with the release of the Infiniti JX. It joins Toyota's Lexus brand in terms of blending front-wheel drive and rear-wheel drive vehicles again; since its inception in 1989, Lexus has had front-wheel drive platforms underpinning entry-level vehicles like the Lexus ES and Lexus RX. More importantly, the JX was meant to give Infiniti a credible rival to the Acura MDX and BMW X5 crossovers that offer optional three-row seating.

In 2012, Infiniti moved its global headquarters from the Nissan corporate building in Yokohama and incorporated in Hong Kong as Infiniti Global Limited, with Carlos Ghosn intending for Infiniti to have a greater focus on the burgeoning luxury market in mainland China as it forecast the country to become the largest luxury car market. Nissan appointed Roland Krüger, former head of BMW's Asian division, as president of Infiniti in September 2014.

In mid-2013 Infiniti announced their Q30 Concept car would get its world premiere at the 2013 Frankfurt Motor Show, a move which would see Infiniti start an aggressive strategy to extend the Infiniti brand into new premium segments. In 2013, Infiniti's model designation changed to the coupes and sedans starting with the letter Q (SUVs and crossovers starting with the letters QX) and a number reflecting the model's place in the brand lineup. The M sedan became the Q70 while the G sedan was replaced with the Q50; meanwhile, the QX56 became the QX80 while the EX became the QX50.

In August 2013 Infiniti announced that Simone Piattelli Palmarini would take up the role as head of public relations for Infiniti EMEA. Known to many in the media, Simone had previously worked for Pirelli and Ferrari.

With its QX60 crossover (formerly known as JX35) Infiniti began to produce vehicles outside Japan. In 2014, it started producing two models in Xiangyang, China, a plant operated by Nissan's joint venture with Dongfeng Motor. At the same time, Nissan Motor Manufacturing UK expanded in Sunderland, England, to produce a new compact car named Q30 in 2015. In mid-2019, the Sunderland plant ceased assembly of Infiniti vehicles in the United Kingdom.

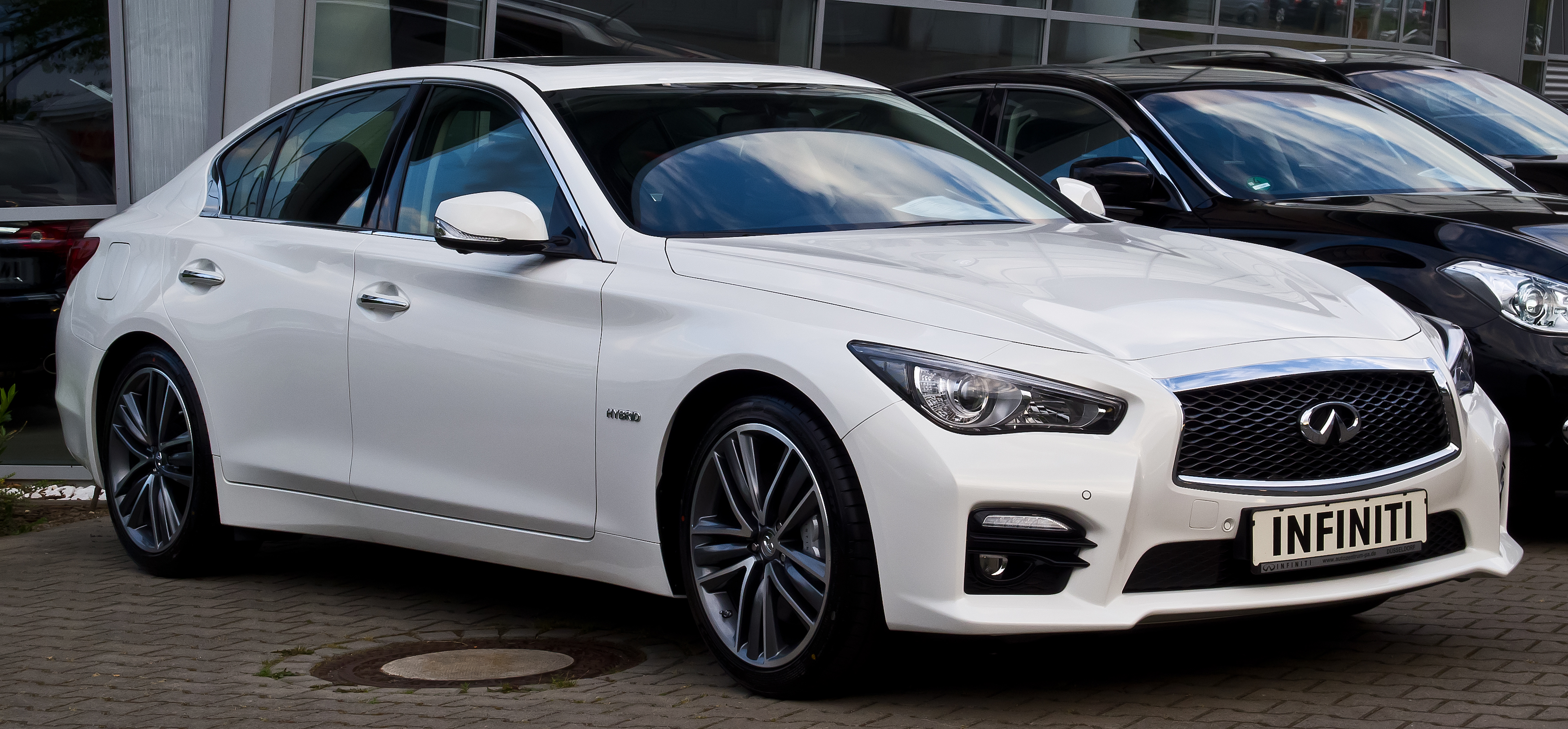
Infiniti Q50 S Hybrid

Johan de Nysschen was appointed to head the Infiniti division in 2012. De Nysschen left the company as of August 2014 to become CEO of Cadillac. Infiniti Chairman Andy Palmer assumed de Nysschen's responsibilities. Nissan appointed Roland Krüger, former head of BMW's Asian division, as president of Infiniti after the chairman of the marque, Andy Palmer, resigned to join Aston Martin in September 2014.

In January 2018, chief executive Hiroto Saikawa announced that the Infiniti brand would be transformed into an electric brand, with all new vehicles either being hybrid or all-electric by 2021.

In 2019, Infiniti announced that the brand would be leaving the Western European market. This is due to a combination of poor sales and the uncertain Brexit outcome. Furthermore, Infiniti was lacking brand equity and remained a niche player in the premium car market dominated by the longtime three German luxury marques (Audi, BMW, Mercedes-Benz). Infiniti stated its intent to focus on the Chinese (excluding Hong Kong and Macau), Middle East, and North American markets instead, where most of the brand's sales come from. Subsequently, the QX30 and Q30 produced at the Nissan factory in Sunderland were to cease production. Similarly, on September 3, 2019, it was announced that Infiniti would leave Australia and New Zealand due to slow sales in the region.

Accordingly, Infiniti left the European (with the exception of Caucasus, Russia, Belarus, Kazakhstan, and Ukraine), South African, Australian, New Zealand, Hong Kong, Macau, Indonesian, Malaysian, Singaporean, South Korean, and Vietnamese markets in 2020. In South Korea, sales of Nissan and Infiniti had dropped after "consumer sentiment against Japanese products intensified", leading to both marques being discontinued there, as the Nissan Motor Company never made a profit in South Korea during its tenure in the South Korean auto market from 2005 until its exit in 2020, due to the Korean opposition towards everything associated with Japan. It also relocated its headquarters from Hong Kong to Yokohama, Japan, where parent company Nissan is located.

In November 2021, Nissan stated that its Infiniti brand will become 100 percent all-electric by 2030, ending production and new car sales of fossil fuel powered Infiniti vehicles by that year.

In March 2022, Nissan withdrew entirely from Russia and Belarus as a result of the 2022 Russian invasion of Ukraine, effectively ending all production in Russia, exports into Russia and Belarus, and new car sales of Nissan and Infiniti vehicles in those countries as a result of huge sanctions imposed on Russia and Belarus by the European Union, Japan, United Kingdom, and the United States.

In August 2024, the Q50 sedan was discontinued due to poor sales, causing Infiniti to become a brand just selling SUVs.

== Leadership ==
- Johan de Nysschen (2012–2014)
- Andy Palmer (2014)
- Roland Krueger (2015–2019)
- Christian Meunier (2019–2020)
- Peyman Kargar (2020–2023)
- Jose Roman (2023–present)

== Sales by calendar year ==
Year	U.S.	Canada	Europe	China	Mexico	Middle East	Asia & Oceania	Taiwan	Worldwide
1999	72,637								
2000	88,351								
2001	71,365								
2002	87,911								
2003	118,655								
2004	130,980	7,841							
2005	136,401	7,672							
2006	121,146	6,779							
2007	127,037	6,756							
2008	112,989	8,159	453						
2009	81,089	7,081	1,319						
2010	103,411	8,233	2,393						
2011	98,461	6,936	3,686						
2012	119,877	7,993	2,995						
2013	116,455	8,947	2,451	17,084	1,006	5,652	2,357		164,052
2014	117,330	10,082	4,800	30,000	1,500	7,100	4,600		186,200
2015	133,498	11,300	7,000	40,200	1,800	8,300	5,700		215,250
2016	138,293	12,114	13,775	41,731				1,983	230,366
2017	153,415	12,433	16,625	48,408		6,141	6,552	2,440	246,492
2018	149,280	12,581							
2019	117,708	10,974							
2020	79,502	5,783							
2021	58,553	5,838							
2022	46,619	5,446							
2023	64,699	5,208							
2024	58,070	6,300							

== Models ==
Infiniti's former model name designation included one letter for coupés and sedans, two letters for SUVs, and a number reflecting engine displacement. For example, the QX56 was an SUV featuring a 5.6L engine. An exception to this was the QX4 SUV, which featured a 3.3L engine (1996–2000) and later a 3.5L engine (2000–2003). An "x" following the engine displacement of Infiniti sedans denoted an all wheel drive model (e.g. Infiniti G35x), "s" denoted a sport package, "h" denoted a hybrid model, and "d" denoted a diesel model.

In 2013, Infiniti's model designation changed to the coupes and sedans starting with the letter Q, the SUVs and crossovers starting with the letters QX, and a number reflecting the model's place in the brand lineup. The M sedan became the Q70, the G coupe became the Q60, and the G sedan became the Q50; meanwhile, the QX56 became the QX80, the FX became the QX70, the JX became the QX60 and the EX became the QX50.

=== Concept vehicles ===
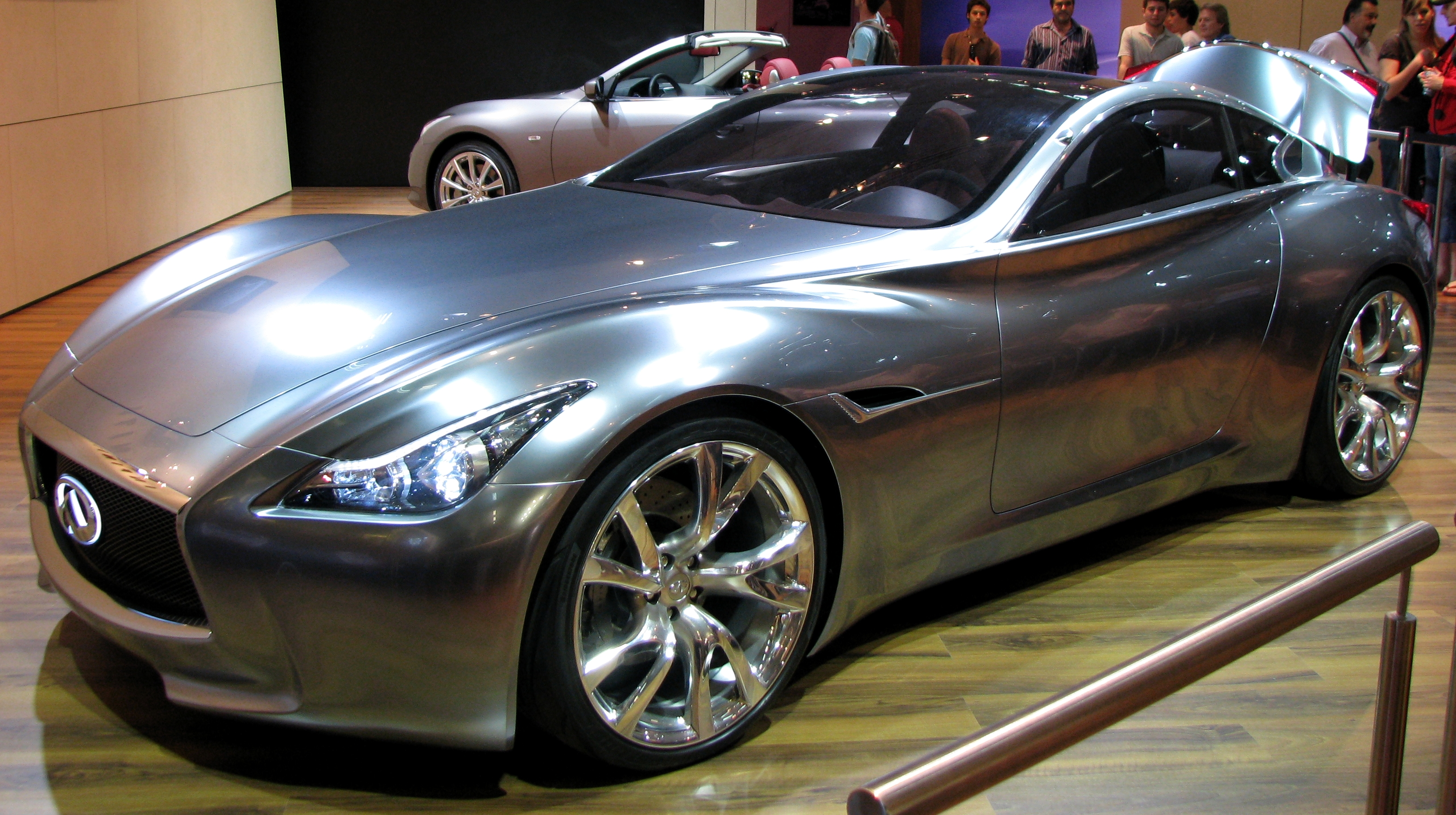
Infiniti Essence Concept

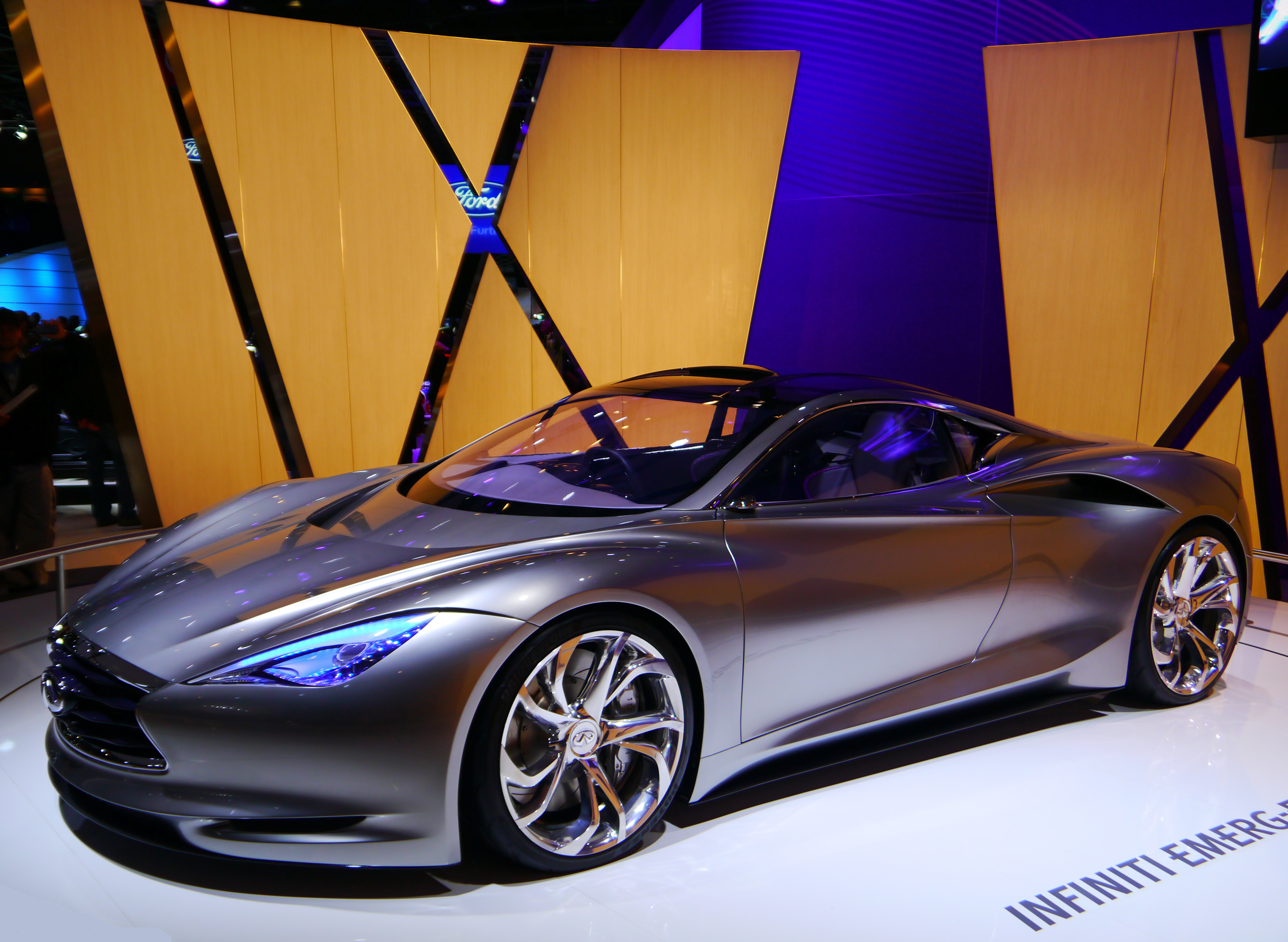
Infiniti Emerg-e Concept

- Infiniti FX45 Concept (2001, 2002)
- Infiniti Triant (2003)
- Infiniti Kuraza (2005)
- Infiniti Coupe (2006)
- Infiniti EX Concept (2007)
- Infiniti Essence (2009)
- Infiniti Etherea (2011)
- Infiniti Emerg-e (2012)
- Infiniti Q30 Concept (2013)
- Infiniti Q50 Eau Rouge (2014)
- Infiniti Q80 Inspiration (2014)
- Infiniti QX Sport Inspiration (2016)
- Infiniti Prototype 9 (2017)
- Infiniti QX50 Concept (2017)
- Infiniti QX80 Monograph (2017)
- Infiniti Q60 Project Black S Concept (2017)
- Infiniti Prototype 10 (2018)
- Infiniti Q Inspiration (2018)
- Infiniti QS Inspiration (2019)
- Infiniti QX Inspiration (2019)
- Infiniti QX Monograph (2023)
- Infiniti Vision Qe (2023)
- Infiniti QX65 Monograph (2025)

== Infiniti Performance Line ==
In August 2010, Infiniti unveiled its new performance marque named Infiniti Performance Line, or IPL.

== Motorsports ==
In 1996, Nissan launched an effort to compete in the Indy Racing League with the Infiniti brand. The engine chosen for the Indy cars was a racing variant of the VH engine used in the production Q45s. Eddie Cheever resulted third in the 2000 season. The IRL program was quietly wrapped after the 2002 season after a few wins.

In 2011, Infiniti began sponsoring Formula One team Red Bull Racing, which was chosen due to the team's already existing collaboration with the Renault-Nissan Alliance, with Renault supplying engines to Red Bull Racing. In 2011, Infiniti signed Formula One World Champion Sebastian Vettel as its first global ambassador. Infiniti ended its sponsorship of the team after the 2015 season.

The establishment of Renault F1 Team in 2016 by the Renault-Nissan-Mitsubishi alliance provided Infiniti with the opportunity to evolve its involvement in Formula One, collaborating on three main projects. Infiniti contributes engineering resources to Renault F1 Team for the co-development of the Power Unit's Energy Recovery System (ERS), including relocating several of their specialists to the Renault F1 Team's facilities in France. In addition, the Infiniti Engineering Academy provides for engineering students to collaborate with the Renault F1 Team. Infiniti and the Renault F1 team also collaborate on Project Black S, a road car that features an ERS inspired by the one used in Formula One.

In 2020, a few Infiniti Q50s were entered into the British Touring Car Championship by Laser Tools Racing. They won the drivers' championship with Ash Sutton at the wheel that year and the subsequent year.

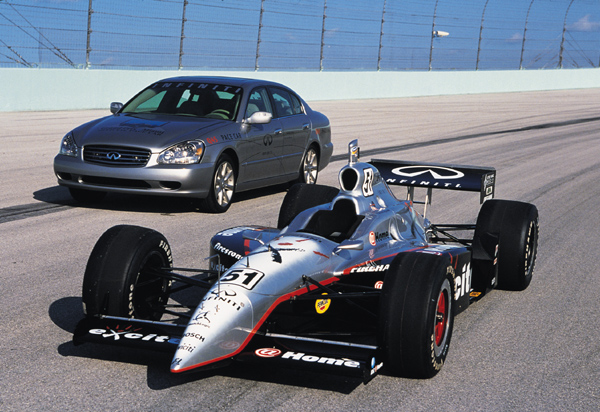
Infiniti Indy car next to a production Q45

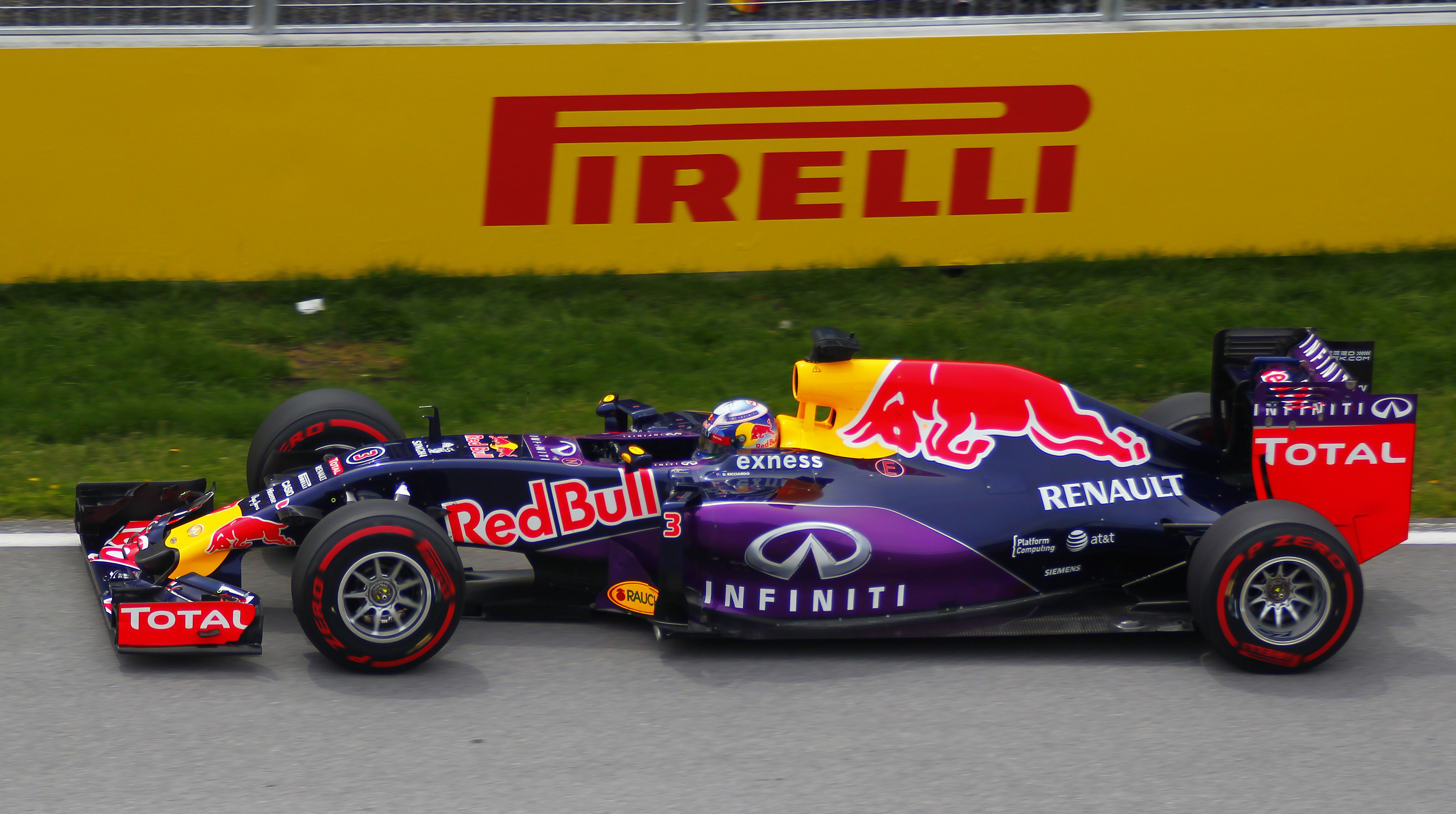
Daniel Ricciardo driving the RB11 at the 2015 Canadian Grand Prix for Infiniti Red Bull Racing

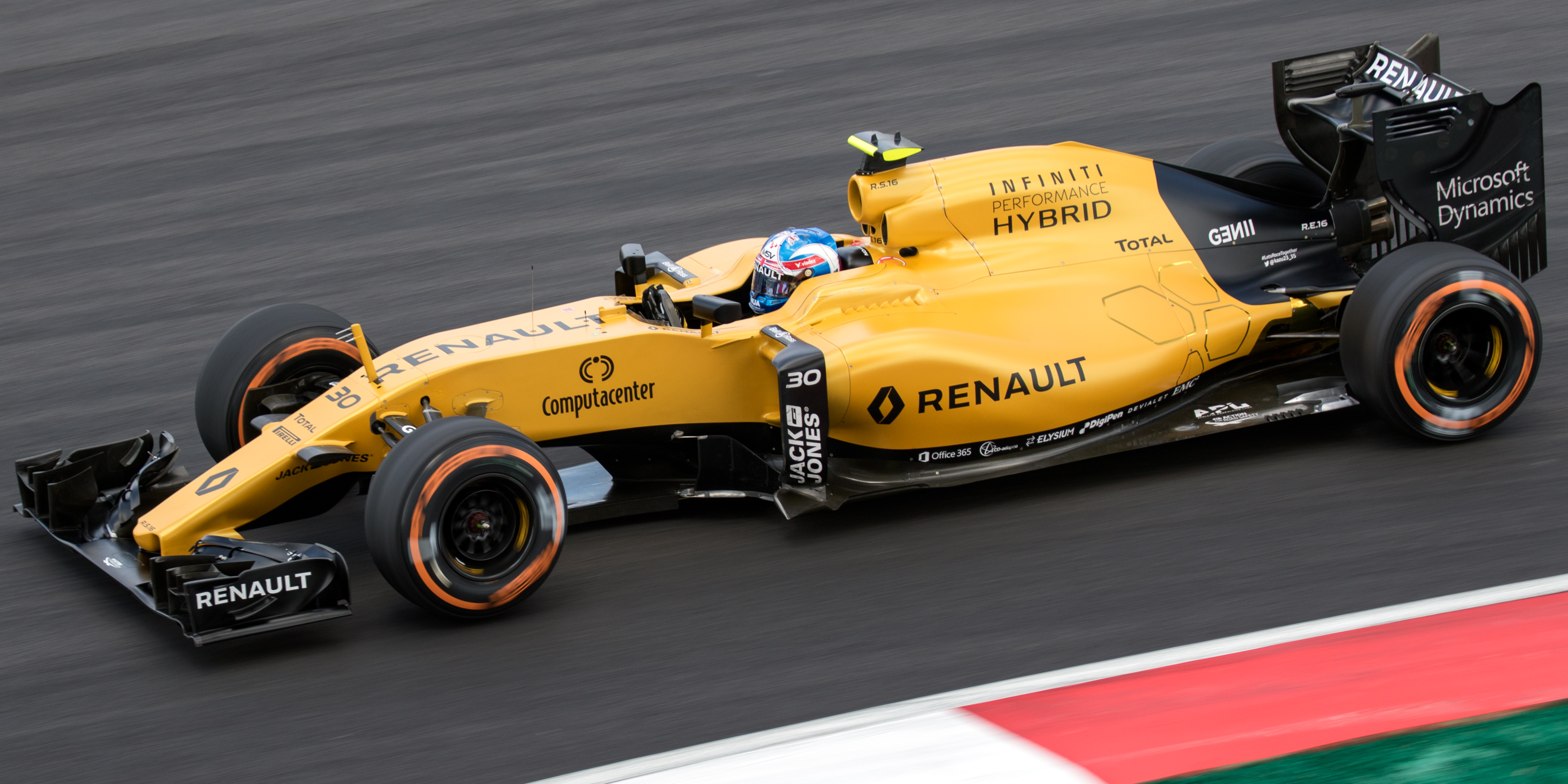
The Renault R.S.16, driven by Jolyon Palmer, during the 2016 Malaysian Grand Prix
