= Infiniti Kuraza =

Overview
- Production: 2005 (Concept car)
- Designer: Nissan

Body and chassis
- Class: Mid-size luxury SUV
- Body style: 6-door SUV
- Layout: F4 layout

The Infiniti Kuraza is a concept car designed by Nissan, under the Infiniti brand at the Nissan Technical Center in Atsugi, Japan, headed by product design director Kojii Nagano. It made its world debut in Detroit, at the 2005 North American International Auto Show. The Infiniti Kuraza ultimately never made it to production.

== Design ==
The Kuraza focuses more on space than utility in its design, featuring stadium-style six-passenger seating, which allow passengers unhindered access to rear seats using third-row doors. The designers built the Kuraza on the idea that all luxury passengers should be treated equally. This spawned the idea that all seats in the luxury vehicle will be equally as comfortable in all dimensions. Nagano stated that the Kuraza concept was about hospitality rather than transportation, with the design intending the vehicle to be a social space. The Kuraza design team decided that one of the limiting factors of comfort in luxury SUVs was convenient access to rear seating, and there are wide, unhinged, 3rd row doors on the Kuraza to deal with inconvenient access.

== Japanese design elements ==
The Kuraza team aimed to fuse the elements of traditional Japanese heritage and luxury with modern technology. The shape of the seatbacks are meant to suggest traditional the Japanese kimono. The layers of fabric reference Juni-hitoe design. The Infiniti logo is also on each seat, that is supposed to represent where a family crest could be found. The Uramasari tradition of fine clothing is also represented by the combination of materials used in the seats, leather for outer areas and raw silk underneath. The aluminium and wood flooring is also cut in the traditional Chijimi grain method. The Kuraza has a large touch screen 16 by 6 inch vertically oriented center monitor. This monitor is a modern interpretation of Kakejiku. The design team stated that they were looking for new ways to add an emotional element to information-centric monitors. The monitor can also be programmed with modern applications, such as weather and road conditions.

== Interior ==
The interior of the Kuraza includes six-passenger seating, a center beam console, LED lightning, door grips, foot rests, foot wells, and six individual reading lights. The Kuraza also has large windowed areas, with a glass overhead made of three panels for a panoramic view from all seats, with soft overhead lighting at night.

== Exterior ==
The Kuraza’s exterior includes an Infiniti-style “double-arch” tinted aluminum grille, multi-lamp LED headlights, with a tiny “surround-view” camera for blind spots. The Kuraza’s exterior is a deep violet color, with a metallic flake. Fine-grain finish aluminum is used all around the exterior of the vehicle. The vehicle runs on 23-inch 8-spoke aluminum-alloy wheels, and Special Dunlop 305/45R23 tires.

== Reception ==
The Infiniti Kuraza concept met with a negative reception after it was unveiled, and never found its ground after that. One such case of criticism was when A “Bag It or Build It?” survey was posted on The Wall Street Journal, asking for readers to vote on whether they like the auto industry’s ideas for future vehicles. Out of 7 concept vehicles, the Infiniti Kuraza appeared at the top of the “Bag it” list, with 69% of readers, 2497 people, stating their dislike of the vehicle.
