= Infiniti Etherea =

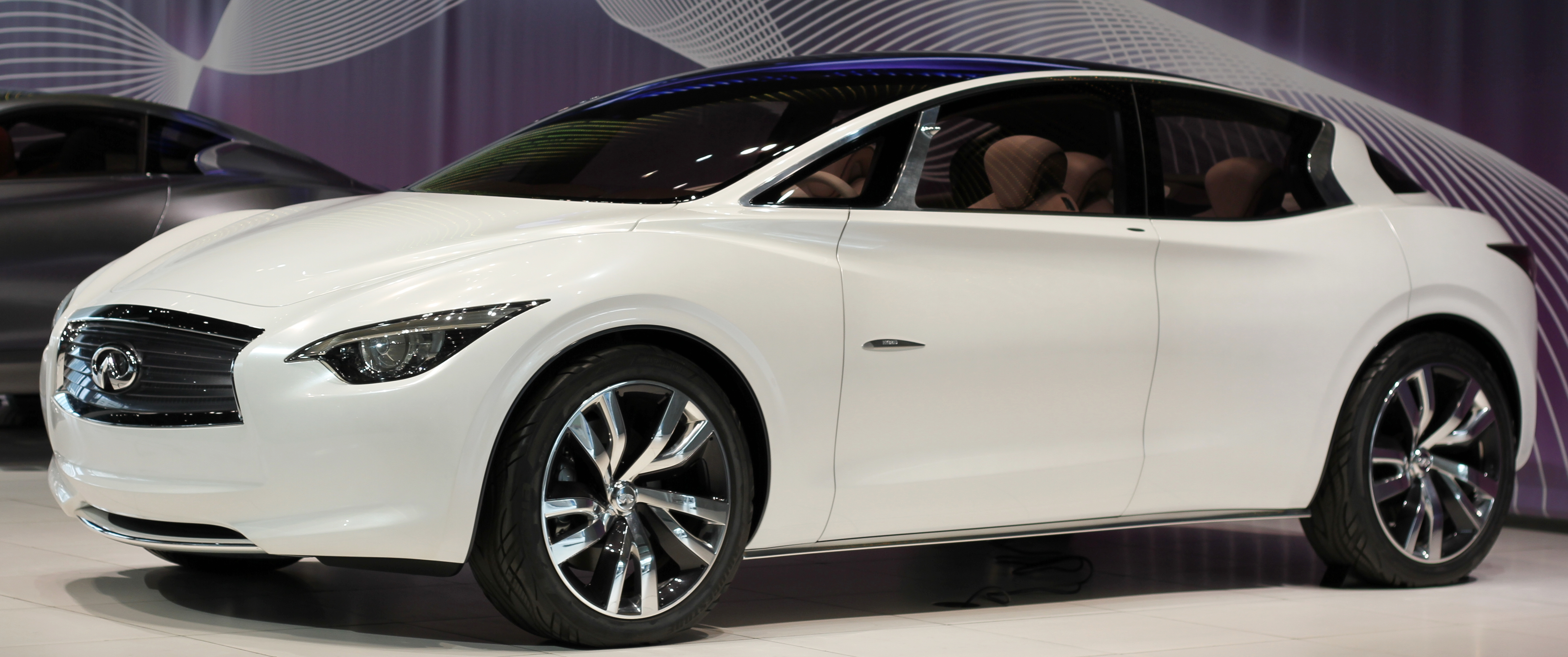

Overview
- Manufacturer: Infiniti
- Production: 2011 (Concept car)
- Designer: Giichi Endo

Body and chassis
- Class: Compact car (C)
- Body style: 5-door hatchback
- Layout: Front-engine, front-wheel-drive
- Related: Nissan Qashqai; Renault Mégane

Powertrain
- Engine: 2.5 L SC I4

Dimensions
- Length: 4,400 mm (173.2 in)

Chronology
- Successor: Infiniti Q30

The Infiniti Etherea is a concept car that was announced at the 2011 Geneva Motor Show made by the Infiniti division of Nissan Motors.

The Etherea is a front-wheel drive compact executive 5-door hatchback with 5 seats and not dissimilar in size and concept to the Lexus CT200h and is built on the same platform as the Nissan Qashqai and Renault Mégane.

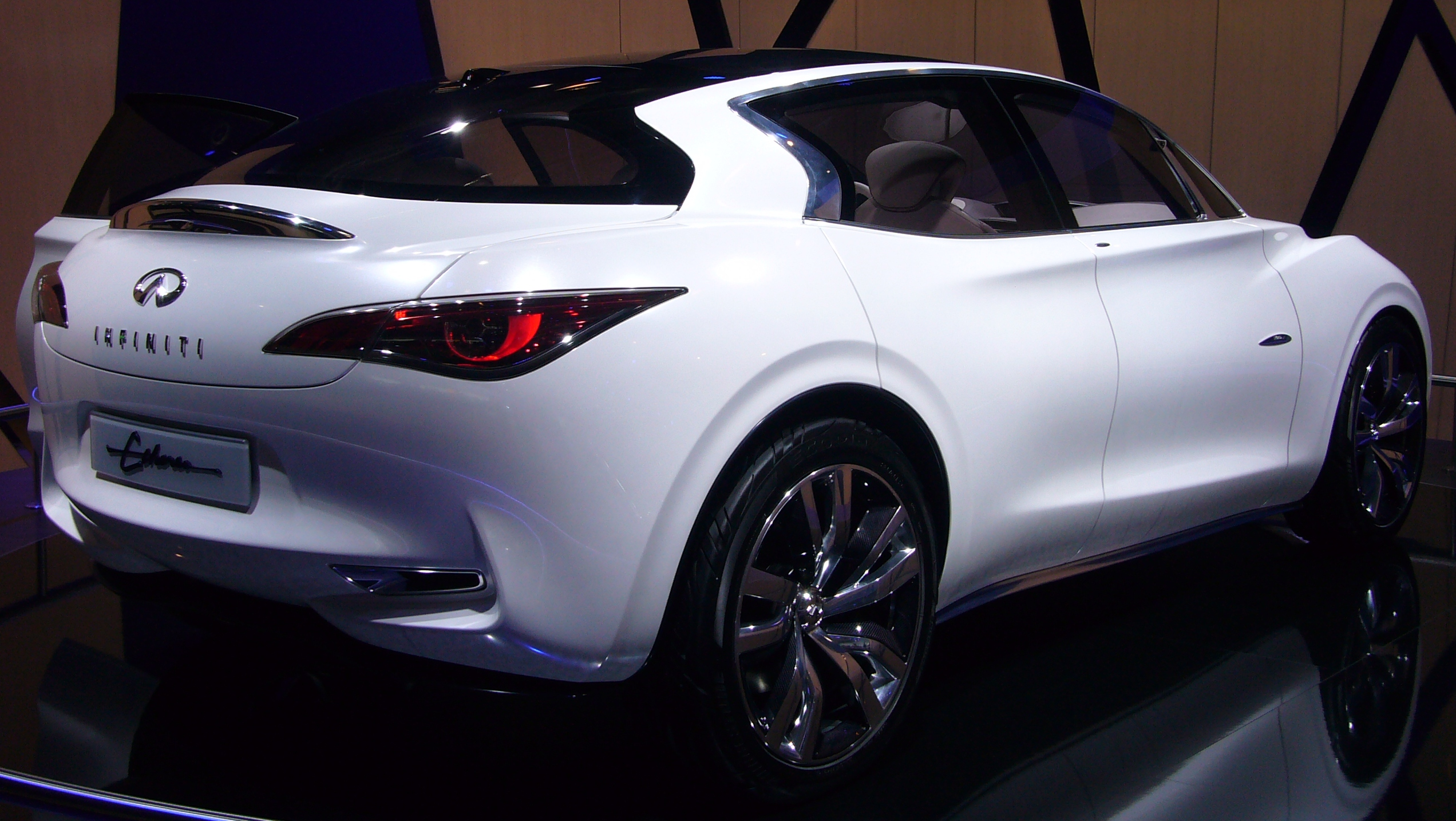
Rear view

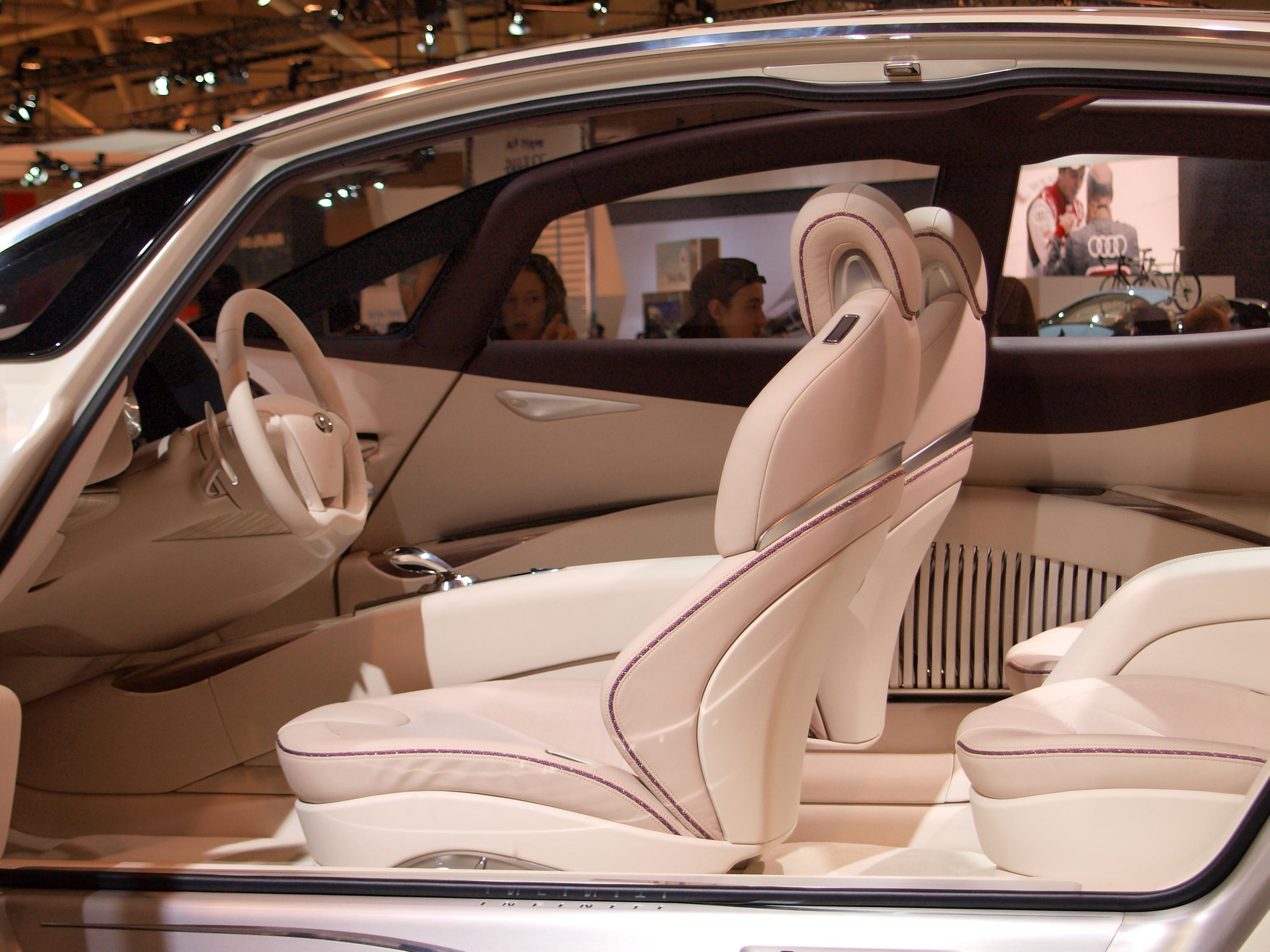
Interior

The Etherea is powered by a supercharged 2.5-litre I4 petrol engine producing 241 bhp (180 kW; 244 PS) with a 33 bhp (25 kW; 33 PS) lithium-ion battery-powered electric motor to maintain momentum. It is 4,400 mm (173.2 in) long and has a glass roof and rear suicide doors for easy access to the rear seats.
