= Infiniti Essence =

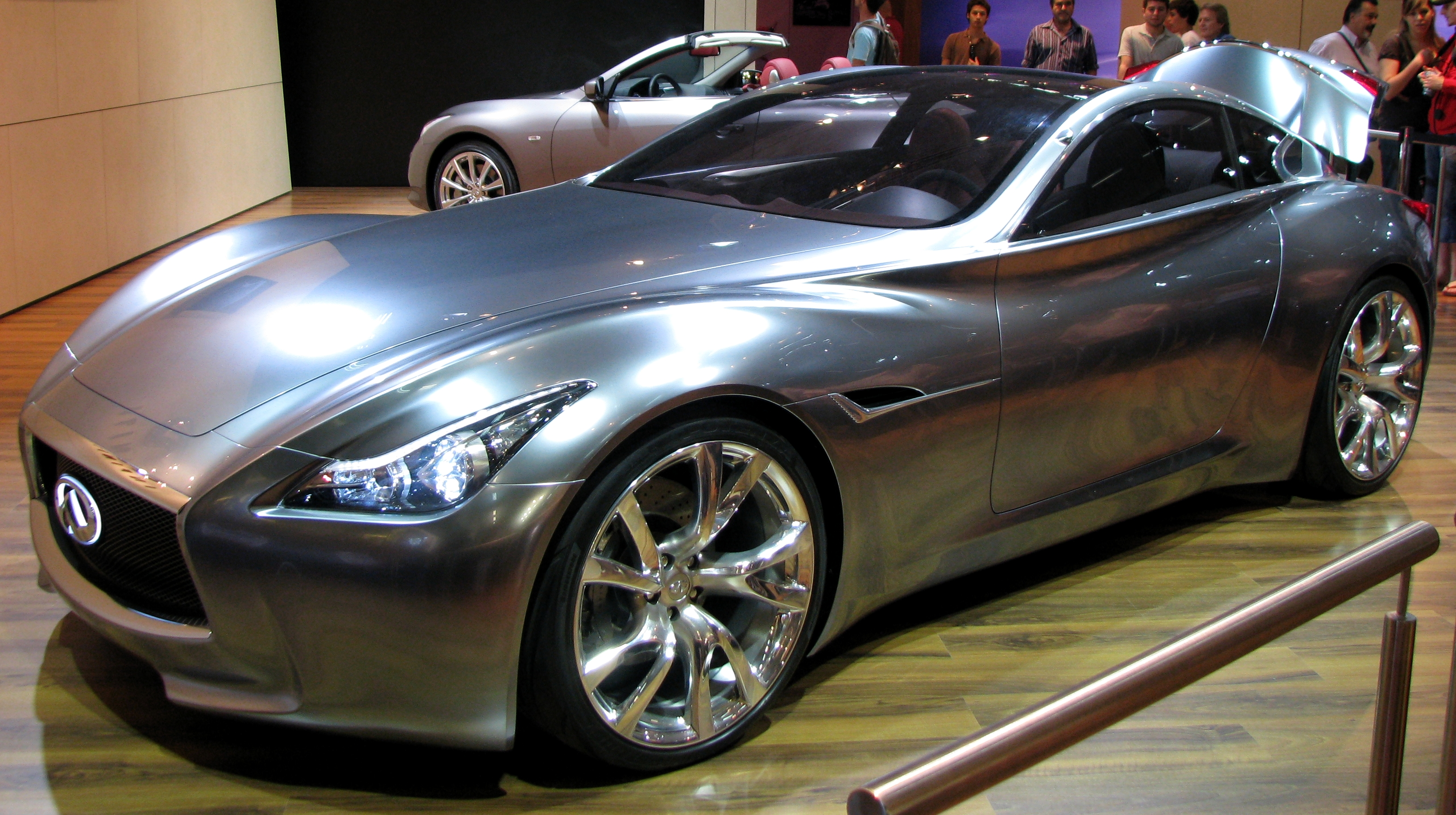

Overview
- Manufacturer: Nissan
- Production: Concept car only
- Designer: Takashi Nakajima

Body and chassis
- Class: Sports car
- Body style: 2-door coupe
- Layout: FR layout

Powertrain
- Engine: 3.7 L 24-valve DOHC twin-turbo V6 engine, 3D Electric Power Assist Motor
- Transmission: 6-speed sequential

Dimensions
- Wheelbase: 2,800 mm (110 in)
- Length: 4,720 mm (186 in)
- Width: 1,960 mm (77 in)
- Height: 1,310 mm (52 in)

The Infiniti Essence is a concept sports car designed to commemorate the 20th anniversary of the Infiniti brand. The vehicle was unveiled at the 2009 Geneva Motor Show. The car is a hybrid electric vehicle and is among the first energy-efficient cars Infiniti has released.

The vehicle was designed by Infiniti design director Takashi Nakajima. Its external appearance is a modern interpretation of "coke bottle styling", a feature that was very popular during the 1960s and 1970s internationally. The interior design was initially conceived (Paul Ray) in the Nissan Design Europe studio based in Paddington, London. Following the interior concept being chosen it was then further developed and built in Japan.

The Essence concept is not expected to enter production, but elements from the car were planned to be incorporated into later Infiniti models.

== Engines ==
It included a 3.7 L V6 gasoline engine with twin turbochargers rated 440 PS (324 kW; 434 hp), an electric motor (called 3D Motor) rated 160 PS (118 kW; 158 hp) and 500 N⋅m (369 lb⋅ft), with a combined rating of 600 PS (441 kW; 592 hp).

The electric motor was powered by lithium-ion battery at lower trunk area.

== Equipment ==
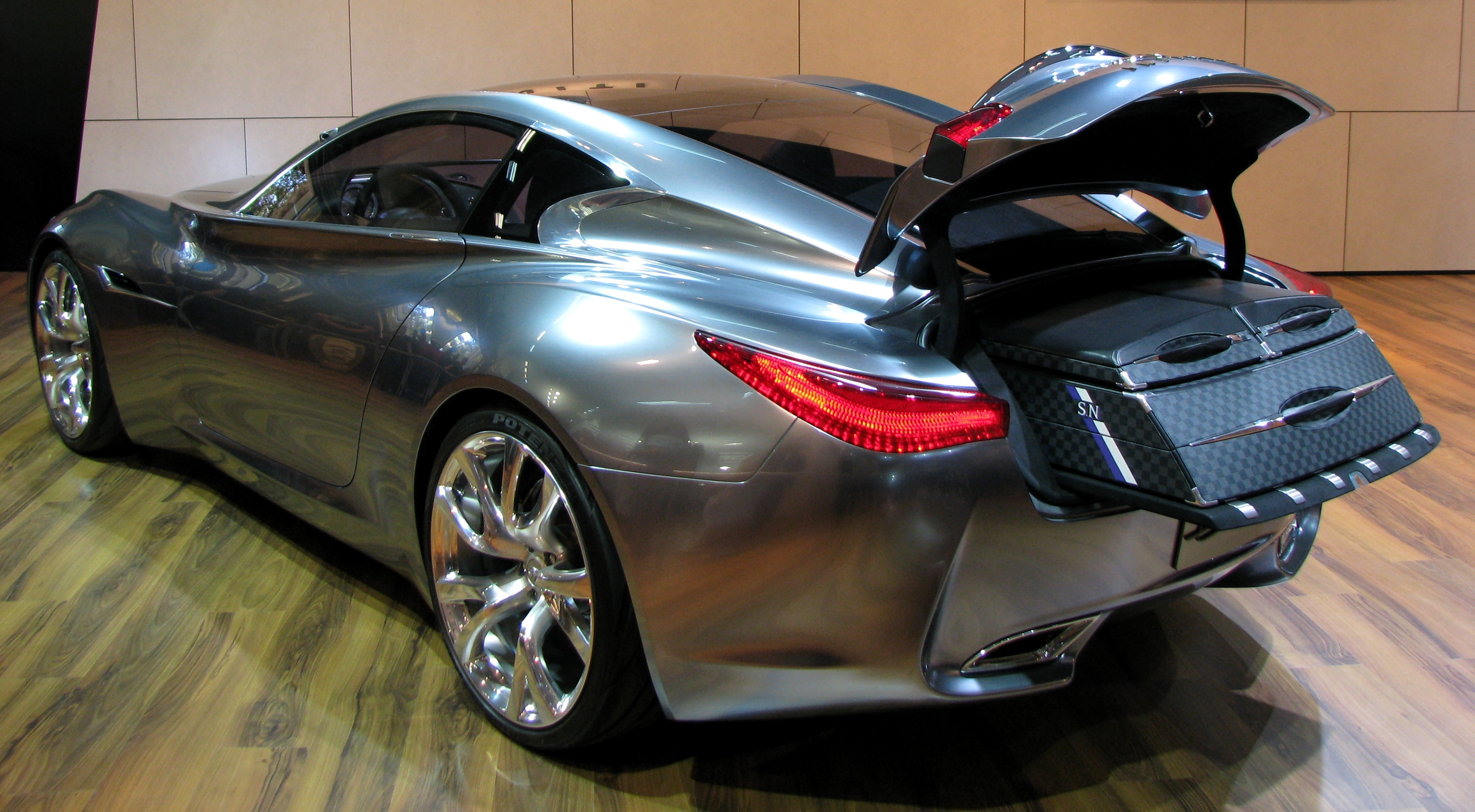
The three-piece Louis Vuitton luggage set in the trunk.

A three-piece Louis Vuitton luggage set fits in the trunk, and the floor slides out when the trunk is open to access the luggage.

The Infiniti Essence also contains safety features to prevent collisions in the back and side that are known as Side Collision Prevention (SCP) and Back-up Collision Prevention (BCP). Sensors on the sides and back warn the driver when it senses a vehicle, and brakes are activated if the warning is ignored.
