= 2026 D1 Grand Prix series =

Professional drifting competition

The 2026 D1 Grand Prix series (known for sponsorship reason as 2026 Gran Turismo D1 Grand Prix series) was the 26th season of the D1 Grand Prix drifting series. The competition is organized by Sunpros under Japanese Automobile Federation (JAF) Semi national competition format and recognize as Japan Drift Championship. The championship is contested over 10 rounds starting at Aichi Sky Expo on 24 May and ended on 15 November 2026 at Odaiba. The season is celebrated as the twenty-fifth anniversary of D1 Grand Prix. Hideyuki Fujino entered as the defending drivers champion.

Koudai Sobagiri won his first overall championship along with defending the tanso championship. Mind Control Racing Shibatire won the teams championship.

== Schedule ==
Provisional schedule was released following the final round of 2025 season. Aichi Sky Expo in Nagoya will host the opening two rounds of the season. The venue is located near Centrair which have previously held D1GP round back in 2013. In turns, Okuibuki Motorpark will not held any round for the first time since 2019. The rest of the calendar will be held at same weekend as previous year.

Round	Venue	Date
1	Aichi Sky Expo, Aichi Prefecture	9 May
2	Aichi Sky Expo, Aichi Prefecture	10 May
3	Tsukuba Circuit, Ibaraki Prefecture	27 June
4	Tsukuba Circuit, Ibaraki Prefecture	28 June
5	Ebisu Circuit, Fukushima Prefecture	26 September
6	Ebisu Circuit, Fukushima Prefecture	27 September
7	(Ōita Prefecture) Autopolis, Oita Prefecture	24 October
8	(Ōita Prefecture) Autopolis, Oita Prefecture	25 October
9	Odaiba, Tokyo Bay	14 November
10	Odaiba, Tokyo Bay	15 November

== Regulation changes ==
- Best 24 is brought back for the first time since 2015 when the system was known as tanso qualifying. The best 24 format will be run on several round only. This led to change on tanso and teams' points which now reward point to 24 driver and its team if the best 24 format is used while the driver overall standings remain only awarding point to top 16 driver regardless of the system being used and team standings remain only scored by highest finishing driver.
- Multi cars team that is not participating in 2025 is mandated to participate for full-season.
- The noise limit is reduced from 113 dB to 110 dB or vary depends on venue.
- The number of mechanic allowed in staging area during tanso is increased from one to two mechanics.
- During tsuiso race director allowed to assign a score correction to lead car for serious driving error.
- Team member must now mandated to wear a similar team wear.
- Only mechanic with fire-proof suit is allowed in hot pit area.

== Teams and drivers ==
Teams	Tire	Car	Engine	No	Drivers	Round	Ref.
URAS RACING	Dunlop	Nissan Skyline (R34)	Toyota 2JZ I6	3	(Japan) Keiichi Nomura	1-10	
CUSCO RACING	Yokohama	Toyota GR Yaris (GXPA16)	Toyota 2JZ I6	5	(Japan) Yoshitatsu Kaneda	1-10	
CUSCO RACING	Yokohama	Toyota GR86 (ZN8)	Toyota 2JZ I6	32	(Japan) Koji Tada	1-10	
RADBODY CUSCO Racing	Shibatire	Toyota GR Corolla (GZEA14)	Toyota 2JZ I6	59	(Republic of Ireland) Jack Shanahan	9-10	
Red Bull CUSCO Racing	Shibatire	Toyota GR Corolla (GZEA14)	Toyota 2JZ I6	97	(Republic of Ireland) Conor Shanahan	9-10	
TEAM RE雨宮 マツモトキヨシ シバタイヤ	Shibatire	Mazda RX-7 (FD3S)	Custom 4-rotor	7	(Japan) Yukio Matsui	1-10	
VEHIQL RACING×VALINO	Valino	Nissan 180SX (RPS13)	Toyota 2JZ I6	8	(Japan) Takuya Inaoka	1-10	
TEAM BUZZBREAK DRIFT	Valino	Nissan Silvia (S15)	Toyota 2JZ I6	9	(Japan) Tetsuya Kume	1-10	
TEAM BUZZBREAK DRIFT	Valino	Toyota GR86 (ZN8)	Toyota 2JZ I6	10	(Japan) Hayato Miyoshi	1-10	
Team BuzzBreak	Valino	Toyota Mark II (JZX100)	Toyota 2JZ I6	50	(Japan) Ryo Ishii	1-10	
FAUSTO DRIFT SCHOOL MINI GT	Shibatire	Nissan Silvia (S15)	Toyota 2JZ I6	11	(Brazil) Yukio Fausto	5-6	
Team sky FJトラスポ	Valino	Nissan Silvia (S15)	Toyota 2JZ I6	15	(Japan) Yuta Fujiwara	1-10	
CarGuy Team G-Meister Valino A	Valino	BMW 3-Series (E92)	Toyota 2JZ I6	16	(Japan) Koji Yamaguchi	1-10	
CarGuy Team G-Meister Valino A	Valino	Toyota GR86 (ZN8)	Toyota 2JZ I6	17	(Japan) Shigehisa Sasayama	1-10	
CarGuy Team G-Meister Valino B	Valino	Toyota Supra (A80)	Toyota 2JZ I6	12	(Japan) Yoshichika Tamagawa R	1-10	
CarGuy Team G-Meister Valino B	Valino	Nissan Silvia (S15)	Toyota 2JZ I6	67	(Japan) Daiki Nishiyama R	1-10	
SIMsupportSpark×GarageHANGOUT	Shibatire	Nissan Silvia (S14)	Toyota 2JZ I6	22	(Japan) Kazutaka Yanagi R	1-10	
Repair Create×GR Garage Seifuto×Result Japan	Shibatire	Toyota GR86 (ZN8)	Toyota 2JZ I6	23	(Japan) Mitsuru Murakami	1-10	
TEAM TNR LOVCA SE System	Antares	Toyota Mark II (JZX100)	Toyota 2JZ I6	30	(Japan) Tetsuro Nakada	1-2,5-10	
Shibata Racing Team	Shibatire	Toyota GR86 (ZN8)	Nissan VR38 V6	31	(Japan) Koudai Sobagiri	1-10	
広島トヨタ team マッハ＆DRoo-P	Dunlop	Toyota GR86 (ZN8)	Toyota 2JZ I6	33	(Japan) Junya Ishikawa	1-10	
広島トヨタ team マッハ＆DRoo-P	Dunlop	Toyota Sprinter Trueno (AE85)	Toyota 2GR V6	55	(Japan) Kazuya Matsukawa	1-10	
Racing Service Watanabe	Antares	Toyota Sprinter Trueno (AE86)	Nissan SR20 I4	43	(Japan) Yoshifumi Tadokoro	1-10	
Racing Service Watanabe	Antares	Mazda RX-7 (FC3S)	Mazda 20B 3-rotor	51	(Japan) Teruyoshi Iwai	1-10	
Team miyaseimitsu	Shibatire	Nissan Silvia (S15)	Custom 4-rotor	38	(Japan) Hisashi Saito	1-10	
Gyeon Racing	Harson	Nissan 180SX (RPS13)	Toyota 2JZ I6	47	(Japan) Hisato Yonai	1-10	
GP Sports	Drift Star	Nissan 180SX (RPS13)	Toyota 2JZ I6	56	(Japan) Takahiro Mori	1-10	
D1TAIWAN DTMRS	Valino	Toyota GR Supra (J29/DB)	Toyota 2JZ I6	57	(Taiwan) Hsu Lei R	1-2.5-6,9-10	
Team Toyo Tires Drift-1	Toyo Tires	Toyota GR86 (ZN8)	Toyota 2JZ I6	66	(Japan) Hideyuki Fujino	1-10	
Team Toyo Tires Drift-1	Toyo Tires	Toyota GR86 (ZN8)	Toyota 2JZ I6	88	(Japan) Masato Kawabata	1-2,5--10	
Team Toyo Tires Drift-2	Toyo Tires	Toyota GR Corolla (GZEA14)	Toyota 2JZ I6	77	(Japan) Hokuto Matsuyama	1-10	
Team Toyo Tires Drift-2	Toyo Tires	Toyota GR86 (ZN8)	Toyota 2JZ I6	80	(Japan) Yuki Tano	1-10	
Team Toyo Tires Drift-3	Toyo Tires	Toyota GT86 (ZN6)	Nissan VR38 V6	14	(Japan) Shiina Tamaki	1-10	
Mind Control Racing SHIBATIRE	Shibatire	Nissan Silvia (S14)	Toyota 2JZ I6	70	(Japan) Masashi Yokoi	1-6,8-10	
Drift Star Racing	Drift Star	Toyota Chaser (JZX100)	Toyota 2JZ I6	75	(Japan) Yumeto Hatanaka	1-10	
Drift Star Racing	Drift Star	Nissan Silvia (S13)	Toyota 2JZ I6	76	(Japan) Ryu Nakamura	1-2,5-10	
Drift Star Racing	Drift Star	Nissan Silvia (S13)	Chevrolet LSX V8	76	(Japan) Ryu Nakamura	3-4	
Team Vertex	Shibatire	Lexus RC (XC10)	Toyota 2JZ I6	78	(Japan) Takahiro Ueno	1-10	
Team Vertex	Shibatire	Nissan Silvia (S15)	Toyota 2JZ I6	89	(Thailand) Lattapon Keawchin (Pop)	1-6,9-10	
Team D-Max Racing	Valino	Nissan Silvia (S15)	Toyota 2JZ I6	79	(Japan) Kojiro Mekuwa	1-10	
Team D-Max Racing	Drift Star	Nissan Silvia (S15)	Toyota 2JZ I6	81	(Japan) Kenshiro Wada	1-10	
Team Valino Works	Valino	Toyota GR86 (ZN8)	Toyota 2JZ I6	86	(Japan) Sayaka Shimoda	1-10	
Team Valino Works	Valino	Toyota GR86 (ZN8)	Toyota 2JZ I6	99	(Japan) Naoki Nakamura	1-10	
FAT FIVE RACING	Yokohama	Toyota GR Supra (J29/DB)	Toyota 2JZ I6	87	(Japan) Daigo Saito	1-10	
WEINS Toyota Kanagawa × 俺だっ！Racing	Valino	Toyota GR Supra (J29/DB)	Toyota 2JZ I6	90	(Japan) Tsuyoshi Tezuka	1-10	

R Eligible for Rookie of the year award

=== Changes ===
- Masashi Yokoi leave D-Max Racing Team at the end of the 2025 season after 13 years. He planned to compete with his own Mind Control Racing team and driving a Nissan Silvia S14 he entered World Time Attack Challenge Drift class with.
- D-Max announced Kojiro Mekuwa transferred from G-Meister to replace Masashi Yokoi who left the team.
- Following Kojiro Mekuwa arrival to the team, D-Max use Valino tires for Mekuwa and Kenshiro Wada use Valino's sister brand, Drift Star.
- Shibata Racing Team downscale to one car with Koudai Sobagiri and not renewed Tetsuya Hibino's contract.
- D1 Lights runner-up, Kazutaka Yanagi announced he will stepping up to D1GP driving the same team and car as in D1 Lights.
- Super GT's Team Mach joined Droo-P as the team title sponsor alongside Hiroshima Toyota and entered as Hiroshima Toyota team Mach & Droo-P.
- Sayaka Shimoda returns to the series after 2 year away. She joined Naoki Nakamura on Valino's works team and driving a Toyota GR86.
- Ryu Nakamura joined Drift Star works team replacing Masakazu Doi.
- 2023 D1 Lights champion, Hisato Yonai returns to the series after a year off. He is sponsored by car care product Gyeon and will drive the same Nissan 180SX he previously use in 2024. He will be using Harson tires.
- Cusco moved Yoshitatsu Kaneda and his Toyota GR Yaris from their Formula Drift Japan line-up to replace Atsuki Hoshi and his GR Corolla respectively. Kaneda will make his first D1GP appearance since 2018 with his GR Yaris being the first example to compete in the series.
- Team G-Meister partner with CARGUY and entered two teams under A and B designation. G-Meister owner Koji Yamaguchi joined by Shigehisa Sasayama drive BMW E92 and Toyota GR86 respectively and both after a year away from the series on the A team. Yoshichika Tamagawa and Daiki Nishiyama both graduate from D1 Lights is on the B team. Tamagawa will drive his A80 Supra he previously use in Formula Drift Japan while Nishiyama upgraded the same S15 he use in D1 Lights.
- Lattapon Keawchin (Pop) joined Takahiro Ueno in Team Vertex replacing his compatriot and senior Daychapon Toyingcharoen (Pond).
- Toyo Tires announced conclusion to Team Toyo Tires Drift works team structure after 2026 season.
- Maopo Yamanaka was initially entered driving for WEINS Toyota Kanagawa × 俺だっ！Racing. However due to misconduct, his D1GP license is suspended. Tsuyoshi Tezuka is brought in to replace him returning to the team as a driver for the first time since final two round of 2022 season. Tezuka will be making his first full time appearance for the first time since 2017.
- Daigo Saito return to using Yokohama for the first time since 2022.
- Tetsuro Nakada change his tires supplier to Antares.
- Taiwanese driver, Hsu Lei set to make his debut driving a Toyota GR Supra. He will be the first Taiwanese driver to enter D1GP since TaI Xiao-Hsang in 2022.

==== In-season changes ====
- Seimi Tanaka is unable to participate for the whole season due to his car being involved in a road accident while being transported. His name is initially listed on all the round after Aichi and later not included in Odaiba entry list.
- Ryu Nakamura change his car to the same V8 powered S13 Silvia that his father, Naoki win the 2024 championship with in Tsukuba round.
- Masato Kawabata set to miss both Tsukuba round as he will be at Ultrace event in Poland. This will be his first time not competing in D1GP round since 2003.
- Brazilian-Japanese Formula Drift Japan driver, Yukio Fausto debuted at Ebisu round as spot entry. He will be driving Nissan Silvia S15.
- Masashi Yokoi received a race ban after accumulating 25 penalty point misses round 7. He returned in following round 8.
- 2026 Formula Drift champions, Conor Shanahan is set to make spot entry for the Odaiba round. He will be driving a Toyota GR Corolla previously used in Formula Drift Japan by Kalle Rovanperä.
- Former Russian Drift Series champion, Jack Shanahan make spot entry for the Odaiba round. He will be driving a Toyota GR Corolla prepared by Cusco. His and younger brother Conor appearance would be the first time D1GP has a pair of siblings since Naoto and Masao Suenaga in 2021 season.

== Round results ==
Round	Venue	Winner		Report
Round	Venue	Tanso	Tsuiso	Report
1	Aichi Sky Expo, Aichi Prefecture	(Japan) Naoki Nakamura	(Japan) Masashi Yokoi	
2	Aichi Sky Expo, Aichi Prefecture	(Japan) Naoki Nakamura	(Japan) Hideyuki Fujino	
3	Tsukuba Circuit, Ibaraki Prefecture	(Japan) Koudai Sobagiri	(Japan) Masashi Yokoi	
4	Tsukuba Circuit, Ibaraki Prefecture	(Japan) Masashi Yokoi	(Japan) Masashi Yokoi	
5	Ebisu Circuit, Fukushima Prefecture	(Japan) Koudai Sobagiri	(Japan) MasashI Yokoi	
6	Ebisu Circuit, Fukushima Prefecture	(Japan) Koudai Sobagiri	(Japan) Masashi Yokoi	
7	(Ōita Prefecture) Autopolis, Oita Prefecture	(Japan) Hideyuki Fujino	(Japan) Koudai Sobagiri	
8	(Ōita Prefecture) Autopolis, Oita Prefecture	(Japan) Koudai Sobagiri	(Japan) Yuki Tano	
9	Odaiba, Tokyo Bay	(Japan) Mitsuru Murakami	(Japan) Naoki Nakamura	
10	Odaiba, Tokyo Bay	(Japan) Koji Tada	(Republic of Ireland) Conor Shanahan	

== Championship standings ==
=== Point system ===
Overall standings

Final classification within each round is determined by highest qualifying position; for example, of the two drivers eliminated in the Best Four, the driver who qualified higher is awarded 3rd position and the final place on the podium. Tie breaker is determined by higher points in tanso standings.

Positions	1st	2nd	3rd	4th	5th	6th	7th	8th	9th	10th	11th	12th	13th	14th	15th	16th
Point	25	21	18	16	13	12	11	10	8	7	6	5	4	3	2	1
Tanso point	4	3	2	1												

=== Overall standings ===
Pos	Driver	Aichi		Tsukuba		Ebisu		Autopolis		Odaiba		Total
Pos	Driver	Rd.1	Rd.2	Rd.3	Rd.4	Rd.5	Rd.6	Rd.7	Rd.8	Rd.9	Rd.10	Total
1	(Japan) Koudai Sobagiri	2	2	9^{1}	3^{4}	3^{1}	5^{1}	1^{3}	2^{1}	DNQ	3^{3}	184
2	(Japan) Naoki Nakamura	9^{1}	3^{1}	2^{2}	4	6^{4}	DSQ	2^{4}	3	1^{3}	2	175
3	(Japan) Masashi Yokoi	1	DSQ	1	1^{1}	1	1^{4}		5^{4}	DNQ	5^{2}	160
4	(Japan) Kojiro Mekuwa	10^{2}	6	5^{4}	2^{3}	9	9	12	11	DNQ	4	101
5	(Japan) Hideyuki Fujino	17	1	3	9^{2}	10^{3}	DNQ	3^{1}	DNQ	7	DNQ	97
6	(Japan) Yuki Tano	11	DNQ	12	13	5^{2}	20	4	1^{2}	12	10^{4}	88
7	(Japan) Hokuto Matsuyama	3³	DNQ	DNQ	16	4	7	7	12	13	13	72
8	(Japan) Ryu Nakamura	DNQ	17	11	DNQ	2	12	6	8	5	DNQ	67
9	(Thailand) Lattapon Keawchin (Pop)	16	7	4	5	23	DNQ			3^{2}	DNQ	62
10	(Japan) Masato Kawabata	14	14			DNQ	13	8	6	2	DNQ	53
11	(Japan) Ryo Ishi	5	4	DNQ	DNQ	17	19	DNQ	DNQ	8	6	51
12	(Japan) Kenshiro Wada	Ret	DNQ	DNQ	8	DNQ	6^{3}	11	DNQ	10^{4}	7	49
13	(Japan) Koji Tada	24	12	DNQ	11	DNQ	23	9	13	6	9^{1}	46
14	(Japan) Daigo Saito	21	15	Ret	DNQ	DNQ	8	DNQ	9^{3}	4	DNQ	38
15	(Japan) Yuta Fujiwara	DNQ	5	DNQ	DNQ	DNQ	DNQ	10	4	DNQ	DNQ	36
16	(Japan) Yumeto Hatanaka	12	10^{3}	10^{3}	DNQ	16	17	DNQ	7	DNQ	DNQ	35
17	(Japan) Yoshicika Tamagawa R	DNQ	19	DNQ	10	7	4	DNQ	DNQ	Ret	DNQ	34
18	(Japan) Hisato Yonai	7	20	13	6	DNQ	24	DNQ	16	14	15	33
19	(Japan) Daiki Nishiyama R	DNQ	18	6	12	21	15	16	14	DNQ	8	33
20	(Japan) Junya Ishikawa	23	11⁴	DNQ	DNQ	11	14	5^{2}	DNQ	DNQ	DNQ	32
21	(Japan) Takuya Inaoka	6	DNQ	16	DNQ	DNQ	11	DNQ	10	11	DNQ	32
22	(Japan) Mitsuru Murakami	19	9²	15	Ret	15	16	14	DNQ	9^{1}	DNQ	31
23	(Japan) Tetsuya Kume	20	16	DNQ	DNQ	14	2	13	DNQ	DNQ	DNQ	29
24	(Japan) Shiina Tamaki	4^{4}	DNQ	DNQ	DNQ	8	DNQ	DNQ	DNQ	DNQ	16	28
25	(Republic of Ireland) Conor Shanahan									DNQ	1	25
26	(Japan) Kazutaka Yanagi R	8	DNQ	DNQ	DNQ	13	10	DNQ	DNQ	DNQ	DNQ	17
27	(Japan) Takahiro Ueno	DNQ	DNQ	DNQ	7	18	DNQ	DNQ	DNQ	DNQ	11	17
28	(Japan) Teruyoshi Iwai	13	WD	7	DNQ	24	DNQ	DNQ	DNQ	DNQ	DNQ	15
29	(Japan) Keiichi Nomura	18	DNQ	8	15	DNQ	DNQ	DNQ	DNQ	DNQ	DNQ	12
30	(Japan) Koji Yamaguchi	DNQ	DNQ	DNQ	14	12	DNQ	DNQ	15	DNQ	DNQ	10
31	(Japan) Sayaka Shimoda	15	13	DNQ	DNQ	19	21	15	DNQ	16	DNQ	9
32	(Japan) Tezuka Tsuyoshi	DNQ	23	DNQ	DNQ	DNQ	22	DNQ	DNQ	15	12	7
33	(Japan) Hayato Miyoshi	Ret	Ret	14	DNQ	DNQ	DNQ	DNQ	DNQ	DNQ	14	6
—	(Brazil) Yukio Fausto					DNQ	18					0
—	(Japan) Shigehisa Sasayama	22	DNQ	DNQ	DNQ	DNQ	DNQ	DNQ	DNQ	DNQ	DNQ	0
—	(Japan) Yoshitatsu Kaneda	DNQ	21	DNQ	DNQ	DNQ	DNQ	DNQ	DNQ	DNQ	DNQ	0
—	(Japan) Yukio Matsui	DNQ	22	DNQ	DNQ	20	DNQ	DNQ	DNQ	DNQ	DNQ	0
—	(Japan) Tetsuro Nakada	DNQ	DNQ			22	DNQ	DNQ	DNQ	Ret	Ret	0
Pos	Driver	Rd.1	Rd.2	Rd.3	Rd.4	Rd.5	Rd.6	Rd.7	Rd.8	Rd.9	Rd.10	Total
Pos	Driver	Aichi		Tsukuba		Ebisu		Autopolis		Odaiba		Total

Tanso standings

Tie breaker is determined by higher event results position.

Format	1st	2nd	3rd	4th	5th	6th	7th	8th	9th	10th	11th	12th	13th	14th	15th	16th	17th	18th	19th	20th	21st	22nd	23rd	24th
Best 16	20	16	15	14	13	12	11	10	8	7	6	5	4	3	2	1	0							
Best 24	28	24	23	22	21	20	19	18	16	15	14	13	12	11	10	9	8	7	6	5	4	3	2	1

=== Tanso standings ===
Pos	Driver	Aichi		Tsukuba		Ebisu		Autopolis		Odaiba		Total
Pos	Driver	Best 24		Best 16		Best 24		Best 16		Best 16		Total
Pos	Driver	Rd.1	Rd.2	Rd.3	Rd.4	Rd.5	Rd.6	Rd.7	Rd.8	Rd.9	Rd.10	Total
1	(Japan) Koudai Sobagiri	7	11	1	4	1	1	3	1	DNQ	3	158
2	(Japan) Naoki Nakamura	1	1	2	10	4	DSQ	4	5	3	7	143
3	(Japan) Kojiro Mekuwa	2	8	4	3	6	6	10	10	DNQ	13	125
4	(Japan) Hideyuki Fujino	9	13	5	2	3	DNQ	1	DNQ	13	DNQ	103
5	(Japan) Yuki Tano	10	DNQ	7	12	2	17	8	2	8	4	100
6	(Japan) Masashi Yokoi	17	DSQ	8	1	5	4		4	DNQ	2	95
7	(Japan) Yumeto Hatanaka	12	3	3	DNQ	17	10	DNQ	7	DNQ	DNQ	85
8	(Japan) Ryu Nakamura	DNQ	15	5	DNQ	11	13	7	8	7	DNQ	81
9	(Japan) Hokuto Matsuyama	3	DNQ	DNQ	16	10	5	11	11	10	10	79
10	(Japan) Mitsuru Murakami	14	2	13	DNQ	15	19	14	DNQ	1	DNQ	78
11	(Japan) Junya Ishikawa	21	4	DNQ	DNQ	7	18	2	DNQ	DNQ	DNQ	68
12	(Japan) Masato Kawabata	19	9			DNQ	16	12	6	5	DNQ	61
13	(Japan) Koji Tada	23	6	DNQ	7	DNQ	22	5	12	11	1	60
14	(Japan) Daigo Saito	18	17	Ret	DNQ	DNQ	7	DNQ	3	9	DNQ	57
15	(Japan) Kazutaka Yanagi R	15	10	DNQ	DNQ	12	8	DNQ	DNQ	DNQ	DNQ	56
16	(Japan) Takuya Inaoka	6	DNQ	15	DNQ	DNQ	12	DNQ	9	6	DNQ	55
17	(Japan) Ryo Ishi	5	18	DNQ	DNQ	9	15	DNQ	DNQ	16	5	55
18	(Thailand) Lattapon Keawchin (Pop)	24	12	12	5	22	DNQ			2	DNQ	51
19	(Japan) Kenshiro Wada	Ret	DNQ	DNQ	15	DNQ	3	9	DNQ	4	8	48
20	(Japan) Hisato Yonai	8	19	9	9	DNQ	24	DNQ	16	12	14	47
21	(Japan) Tetsuya Kume	16	23	DNQ	DNQ	13	11	13	DNQ	DNQ	DNQ	41
22	(Japan) Sayaka Shimoda	22	5	DNQ	DNQ	18	20	15	DNQ	15	DNQ	40
23	(Japan) Yoshicika Tamagawa R	DNQ	24	DNQ	6	14	9	DNQ	DNQ	Ret	DNQ	40
24	(Japan) Daiki Nishiyama R	DNQ	16	10	8	20	23	16	13	DNQ	11	38
25	(Japan) Yuta Fujiwara	DNQ	7	DNQ	DNQ	DNQ	DNQ	6	14	DNQ	DNQ	34
26	(Japan) Koji Yamaguchi	DNQ	DNQ	DNQ	13	8	DNQ	DNQ	15	DNQ	DNQ	24
27	(Japan) Shiina Tamaki	4	DNQ	DNQ	DNQ	24	DNQ	DNQ	DNQ	DNQ	15	23
28	(Japan) Keiichi Nomura	11	DNQ	16	14	DNQ	DNQ	DNQ	DNQ	DNQ	DNQ	18
29	(Japan) Teruyoshi Iwai	13	WD	14	DNQ	23	DNQ	DNQ	DNQ	DNQ	DNQ	17
30	(Japan) Takahiro Ueno	DNQ	DNQ	DNQ	11	16	DNQ	DNQ	DNQ	DNQ	6	16
31	(Brazil) Yukio Fausto					DNQ	14					11
32	(Japan) Tezuka Tsuyoshi	DNQ	22	DNQ	DNQ	DNQ	21	DNQ	DNQ	14	9	10
33	(Japan) Yukio Matsui	DNQ	21	DNQ	DNQ	19	DNQ	DNQ	DNQ	DNQ	DNQ	10
34	(Japan) Hayato Miyoshi	Ret	Ret	11	DNQ	DNQ	DNQ	DNQ	DNQ	DNQ	12	6
35	(Japan) Yoshitatsu Kaneda	DNQ	20	DNQ	DNQ	DNQ	DNQ	DNQ	DNQ	DNQ	DNQ	5
36	(Japan) Shigehisa Sasayama	20	DNQ	DNQ	DNQ	DNQ	DNQ	DNQ	DNQ	DNQ	DNQ	5
37	(Japan) Tetsuro Nakada	DNQ	DNQ			21	DNQ	DNQ	DNQ	Ret	Ret	4
38	(Republic of Ireland) Conor Shanahan									DNQ	16	1
Pos	Driver	Rd.1	Rd.2	Rd.3	Rd.4	Rd.5	Rd.6	Rd.7	Rd.8	Rd.9	Rd.10	Total
Pos	Driver	Best 24		Best 16		Best 24		Best 16		Best 16		Total
Pos	Driver	Aichi		Tsukuba		Ebisu		Autopolis		Odaiba		Total

Teams' standings

Points scored by the highest finishing driver in each round. Point for position 17 to 24th only awarded when best 24 system is used.

Positions	1st	2nd	3rd	4th	5-8th	9-16th	17-24th
Points	26	20	15	10	6	3	1

=== Teams' standings ===
Pos	Team	Aichi		Tsukuba		Ebisu		Autopolis		Odaiba		Total
Pos	Team	Rd.1	Rd.2	Rd.3	Rd.4	Rd.5	Rd.6	Rd.7	Rd.8	Rd.9	Rd.10	Total
1	Mind Control Racing SHIBATIRE	26	0	26	26	26	26		6			136
2	SHIBATA RACING TEAM	20	20	3	15	15	6	26	20			125
3	TEAM VALINO WORKS	3	15	20	10	6	1	20	15			90
4	Team TOYOTIRES DRIFT 1	3	26	15	3	3	3	15	6			74
5	Team TOYOTIRES DRIFT 2	15		3	3	10	6	10	26			73
6	TEAM D-MAX RACING	3	6	6	20	3	6	3	3			50
7	TEAM DRIFT STAR WORKS	3	3	3		20	3	6	6			44
8	TEAM BUZZBREAK DRIFT	1	3	3		3	20	3				33
9	CARGUY Team G-meister VALINO B		1	6	3	6	10	3	3			32
10	TEAM VERTEX D2D SHIBATIRE	3	6	10	6	1						26
11	GYEON Racing	6	1	3	6		1		3			20
12	Team Sky FJ Transport		6					3	10			19
13	Team BuzzBreak	6	10			1	1					18
14	Hiroshima Toyota TEAM Mach x DROO-P	1	3			3	3	6				16
15	Repair Create×GR Garage Seifuto×Result Japan	1	3	3		3	3	3				16
16	Team TOYOTIRES DRIFT 3	10				6						16
17	VEHIQL RACING × VALINO	6		3			3		3			15
18	CUSCO Racing	1	3		3		1	3	3			14
19	FAT FIVE RACING	1	3				6		3			13
20	SIMsupportSPARK × GarageHANGOUT	6	1			3	3					13
21	CARGUY Team G-meister VALINO A	1			3	3			3			10
22	Racing Service Watanabe	3		6		1						10
23	URAS RACING	1		6	3							10
24	WEINS Toyota Kanagawa × 俺だっ！Racing		1				1					2
25	TEAM Amemiya Matsukiyo MINIGT Shibatire		1			1						2
26	FAUSTO DRIFT SCHOOL MINI GT						1					1
27	TEAM TNR LOVCA SE System					1						1
Pos	Team	Rd.1	Rd.2	Rd.3	Rd.4	Rd.5	Rd.6	Rd.7	Rd.8	Rd.9	Rd.10	Total
Pos	Team	Aichi		Tsukuba		Ebisu		Autopolis		Odaiba		Total
