= 2023 D1 Grand Prix series =

Japanese Grand Prix series

2023 Gran Turismo D1 Grand Prix series is the 23rd season of D1 Grand Prix. Started in May 13 in Okuibuki Motorpark and finished at Odaiba in November 12.

Masashi Yokoi is the series reigning champion.

Hideyuki Fujino win both Overall and Tanso series championship for the second time.

== Schedule ==
Calendar released by D1GP

Round	Venue	Date
Kick Off Drift	Makuhari Messe, Chiba Prefecture	January 14 & 15
0 (Exhibition)	Fuji Speedway, Shizuoka Prefecture	April 23
1	Okuibuki Motorpark, Shiga Prefecture	May 13
2	Okuibuki Motorpark, Shiga Prefecture	May 14
3	Tsukuba Circuit, Ibaraki Prefecture	June 24
4	Tsukuba Circuit, Ibaraki Prefecture	June 25
5	Ebisu Circuit, Fukushima Prefecture	August 26
6	Ebisu Circuit, Fukushima Prefecture	August 27
7	(Ōita Prefecture) Autopolis, Oita Prefecture	October 28
8	(Ōita Prefecture) Autopolis, Oita Prefecture	October 29
9	Odaiba, Tokyo Bay	November 11
10	Odaiba, Tokyo Bay	November 12

=== Changes ===
- Fuji Speedway will only held an exhibition event rather than championship round as previous season.
- Odaiba returned to host D1GP round for the first time since 2018 season, 2019 was the last time D1GP ever held any event at Odaiba as the venue was in use for 2020 Summer Olympics. The round will be certified as JAF CUP.
- After 1 year absent D1GP planned to return to Tsukuba Circuit.
- Okuibuki and Ebisu round will held alongside D1 Lights.

== Drivers and Teams ==
Team	No	Driver	Machine	Tires	Rounds
D-MAX RACING TEAM	70	(Japan) Masashi Yokoi	Nissan Silvia (S15)	Goodride	All
D-MAX RACING TEAM	46	(Japan) Masao Suenaga	Nissan Silvia (S15)	Goodride	All
TEAM TOYO TIRES DRIFT	88	(Japan) Masato Kawabata	Toyota GR86 (ZN8)	Toyo Tires	All
TEAM TOYO TIRES DRIFT	66	(Japan) Hideyuki Fujino	Toyota GR86 (ZN8)	Toyo Tires	All
VALINO x N-STYLE	99	(Japan) Naoki Nakamura	Toyota GR86 (ZN8)	Valino	All
TEAM MORI	52	(Japan) Yusuke Kitaoka	Toyota Mark II (JZX100)	Shibatire	All
SHIBATA RACING TEAM	31	(Japan) Koudai Sobagiri	Infiniti Q60	Shibatire	All
SHIBATA RACING TEAM	18	(Japan) Tetsuya Hibino	Toyota GR86 (ZN8)	Shibatire	All
SHIBATA RACING SEIMI STYLE DRIFT	2	(Japan) Seimi Tanaka	Nissan Silvia (S15)	Shibatire	All
+Leno Racing watanabe	77	(Japan) Hokuto Matsuyama	Toyota GR Supra (J29/DB)	Toyo Tires	All
TMS RACING G-MEISTER	16	(Japan) Koji Yamaguchi	BMW 3-Series (E92)	Valino	All
TMS RACING G-MEISTER	79	(Japan) Kojiro Mekuwa	BMW 3-Series (E92)	Valino	All
FAT FIVE RACING	87	(Japan) Daigo Saito	Toyota GR Supra (J29/DB)	Goodride	1-2
FAT FIVE RACING	87	(Japan) Daigo Saito	Toyota GR Supra (J29/DB)	Shibatire	3-10
DRIFT STAR RACING X RACING GEAR	98	(Japan) Hiroki Vito	Nissan Silvia (S13)	Valino/ Drift Star	All
VALINO VAZESTRA	15	(Japan) Katsuhiro Ueo	Nissan Silvia (S15)	Valino	1-8
Z CHALLENGER x BOOSTAR	69	(Japan) Ryusei Akiba	Nissan Silvia (S15)	Valino	All
Z CHALLENGER x BOOSTAR	75	(Japan) Yumeto Hatanaka	Toyota Chaser (JZX100)	Valino	5-10
TEAM RE雨宮 ﾏﾂﾓﾄｷﾖｼ APA	7	(Japan) Yukio Matsui	Mazda RX-7 (FD3S)	Toyo Tires	All
RS WATANABE SPEEDMASTER	43	(Japan) Yoshifumi Tadokoro	Toyota AE86	Habilead	All
RS WATANABE SPEEDMASTER	51	(Japan) Teruyoshi Iwai	Mazda RX-7 (FC3S)	Federal	All
Mercury 車楽人 VALINO	38	(Japan) Sayaka Shimoda	Nissan Silvia (S15)	Valino	All
GP SPORTS	56	(Japan) Takahiro Mori	Nissan 180SX (RPS13)	Valino	All
WEINS Toyota Kanagawa x OREDA RACING	90	(Japan) Genki Mogami	Toyota GR Supra (J29/DB)	Yokohama	All
Team VERTEX x NEXZTER x D2D	78	(Japan) Takahiro Ueno	Lexus RC	Goodride	1-2
Team VERTEX x NEXZTER x D2D	78	(Japan) Takahiro Ueno	Lexus RC	Shibatire	3-10
Team VERTEX x NEXZTER x D2D	95	(Thailand) Daychapon Toyingcharoen	Toyota Soarer (Z30)	Toyo Tires	1-4
Team VERTEX x NEXZTER x D2D	95	(Thailand) Daychapon Toyingcharoen	Nissan Silvia (S15)	Toyo Tires	5-8
Repair Create x 326Power	11	(Japan) Mitsuru Murakami	Toyota GR86 (ZN8)	Shibatire	All
TEAM TNR	30	(Japan) Tetsuro Nakata	Toyota Mark II (JZX100)	Zestino	3-4
GUNSAI Racing SHIBATIRE	27	(Japan) Takeshi Mogi	Nissan Silvia (S15)	Shibatire	All
EWALU RACING SHIBATIRE	84	(Japan) Masakazu Hashi	Nissan Skyline (R34)	Shibatire	1-2,9-10
HIRANO TIRE ★ VALINO RACING	8	(Japan) Tetsuya Kume	Nissan Silvia (S15)	Valino	All
HIRANO TIRE ★ VALINO RACING	93	(Japan) Hiroki Kano	Nissan Silvia (S15)	Valino	All
FORGEDcrew x SATO RANCH	9	(Japan) Wataru Yamamoto	Nissan Silvia (S15)	Shibatire	3-10
DSL.com	86	(Japan) Shigehisa Sasayama	Toyota GR86 (ZN8)	Valino	3-6,9-10
DSL.com	86	(Japan) Shigehisa Sasayama	Toyota Chaser (JZX100)	Valino	7-8
Team miyaseimitsu	38	(Japan) Hisashi Saito	Nissan Silvia (S15)	Valino	5-6
浅井工業 SP security レーシングチーム	6	(Japan) Akinori Utsumi	Nissan Silvia (S15)	Valino	3-4,8-10
MUSEE PLATINUM DxD	12	(Japan) Sumika Kubokawa	Nissan 180SX (RPS13)	Shibatire	All
HIROSHIMA TOYOTA Team DRoo-P	55	(Japan) Kazuya Matsukawa	Toyota Sprinter (AE85)	Dunlop	All
HIROSHIMA TOYOTA Team DRoo-P	33	(Japan) Junya Ishikawa	Toyota GR86 (ZN8)	Dunlop	All
CAR SHOP GLITTER X Car Life ORANGE x Next Dream	29	(Japan) Yuji Saito	Nissan Silvia (S15)	TBA	1-2,9-10
GOODRIDE x NEXZTER	45	(Thailand) Chanatpon Kerdpiam	Nissan Silvia (S15)	Goodride	1-6,9-10
Hot Wheels x Rocket Bunny Racing	39	(Japan) Toshiki Nagai	Nissan Silvia (S13)	Toyo Tires	3-10
NEXZTER DRIVE TO DRIFT	63	(Thailand) Konpichit Toyingcharoen	Nissan 180SX (RPS13)		5-10
NEXZTER DRIVE TO DRIFT	89	(Thailand) Lattapon Keawchin	Toyota Supra (J29/DB)		5-8
NEXZTER DRIVE TO DRIFT	89	(Thailand) Lattapon Keawchin	Toyota GR86 (ZN8)		9-10

=== Changes ===
- D-MAX changes their tire supplier to Goodride, ending 7-year partnership with Nankang.
- Naoki Nakamura return as Valino's works driver alongside Katsuhiro Ueo and will debut a newly build 2JZ powered GR86.
- On Toyo Tires talkshow at 2023 Tokyo Auto Salon, Daigo Saito announce that he will be using Toyo Tires for this season replacing Yokohama. but on first round he's using Goodride instead of Toyo. He will also compete under Fat Five Racing team after TMAR fell through in 2021. For round 3 onwards Daigo use Shibatire and would be supported by them.
- After 2 years out of D1GP, Tetsuya Hibino return as Shibatire Racing Team second driver and will be driving a Toyota GR86 previously driven by Koudai Sobagiri in Formula Drift Japan he replace Masakazu Hashi who will compete as privateer and still using Shibatire. On later date Seimi Tanaka is announced to be joining the team and Shibatire will support Yusuke Kitaoka, Masakazu Hashi, Takeshi Mogi, Wataru Yamamoto and Sumika Kubokawa as tire supplier.
- Both Team G-Meister driver Koji Yamaguchi and Kojiro Mekuwa will participate in E92 BMW 3 Series with support from TMS Racing and entered as "TMS RACING G-MESITER", Kazumi Takahashi planned to pariticipate as spot driver but never participate throughout the season.
- Hiroki Vito will compete under Team Drift Star x RG.
- RE Amemiya reform partnership with their old JGTC sponsor Matsumoto Kiyoshi as their main sponsor.
- Takahiro Mori switch tires from Vitour to Valino.
- Mitsuru Murakami replace his car to Toyota GR86
- Genki Mogami graduate from D1 Lights and elected to be the driver for WEINS Toyota Kanagawa x OREDA! Racing after an audition held by Oreda Racing.
- Takahiro Ueno planned to debut his second Lexus RC with aim of it being lighter than his previous car. He will be joined by returning Daychapon Toyingcharoen who will borrowing Toyota Soarer from Ueno but later fielding his own S15 Silvia.
- Hirano Tire ★ Valino entered Tetsuya Kume and Hiroki Kano with both driver using a Nissan Silvia S15.
- Wataru Yamamoto will compete in a S15 Silvia replacing A90 Supra he use in 2022.
- Shigehisa Sasayama will use Toyota GR86 previously driven by Hokuto Matsuyama in Formula Drift Japan.
- Former D1 Ladies League champions, Sumika Kubokawa will make her debut in D1GP, Kubokawa had previously competed in D1 Street Legal and D1 Lights.
- Team Droo-P returned to D1GP after last competing in 2018 with Kazuya Matsukawa and Junya Ishikawa as driver both returning to D1GP along with Dunlop.
- Yumeto Hatanaka graduate from D1 Lights to join Ryusei Akiba in Z CHALLENGER x BOOSTAR Team.
- Chanatpon Kerdiam make his returm to D1GP.
- Toshiki Nagai makes his debut with Hot Wheels x Rocket Bunny Racing driving an S13 Silvia starting from round 3.
- NEXZTER DRIVE TO DRIFT enter 2 Thai driver Konpichit Toyingcharoen and Lattapon Keawchin, debuting from round 5.

== Results and Point Standing ==
=== Results ===
Round	Event	Winner		Report
Round	Event	Solo Run	Battle	Report
Kick Off Drift	Kick Off Drift	Exhibition only		
0 (Exhibition)	D1GP Round Zero	Hideyuki Fujino	Hideyuki Fujino	
1	Okuibuki Drift	Seimi Tanaka	Masashi Yokoi	
2†	Okuibuki Drift	Masashi Yokoi	Masashi Yokoi	
3	Tsukuba Drift	Koudai Sobagiri	Katsuhiro Ueo	
4	Tsukuba Drift	Koudai Sobagiri	Koudai Sobagiri	
5	Ebisu Drift	Hideyuki Fujino	Masato Kawabata	
6	Ebisu Drift	Hokuto Matsuyana	Hideyuki Fujino	
7	Autopolis Drift	Naoki Nakamura	Masao Suenaga	
8	Autopolis Drift	Naoki Nakamura	Naoki Nakamura	
9	Tokyo Drift	Junya Ishikawa	Hideyuki Fujino	
10	Tokyo Drift	Hideyuki Fujino	Hokuto Matsuyama	

=== Overall Drivers' Ranking ===
Rank.	Driver	Okuibuki		Tsukuba		Ebisu		Autopolis		Odaiba		Total
Rank.	Driver	RD.1	RD.2†	RD.3	RD.4	RD.5	RD.6	RD.7	RD.8	RD.9	RD.10	Total
1	Hideyuki Fujino	12	3	13	11	17	28	10	-	27	25	146
2	Hokuto Matsuyama	18	6	21	1	12	25	13	-	13	25	134
3	Naoki Nakamura	11	-	DSQ	7	16	18	22	29	21	-	124
4	Seimi Tanaka	17	4	12	12	18	12	22		11	9	117
5	Koudai Sobagiri	-	10	12	29	-	10	19	20	9	-	109
6	Masao Suenaga	21	9	9	4	-	-	27	-	7	10	87
7	Tetsuya Hibino	-	12	2	24	10	16	1	11	1	-	77
8	Masashi Yokoi	28	15	DSQ	DSQ	3	14	-	11	-	3	74
9	Masato Kawabata	-	3	-	13	26	-	5	12	-	13	72
10	Hiroki Vito	16	7	11	8	-	4	6	13	-	-	65
11	Katsuhiro Ueo	-	5	25	17	-	-	12	5	-	-	64
12	Mitsuru Murakami	6	4	-	-	24	6	4	-	6	11	61
13	Ryusei Akiba	-	-	-	-	-	-	11	21	10	16	58
14	Yusuke Kitaoka	8	-	-	6	1	10	-	-	19	12	56
15	Kojiro Mekuwa	1	-	17	-	7	3	7	-	12	-	47
16	Junya Ishikawa	-	-	-	-	4	11	-	1	22	7	45
17	Teruyoshi Iwai	10	1	4	-	11	1	-	6	3	-	36
18	Chanatpon Kerdpiam (S)	5	2	6	10	10	-	-	-	-	-	33
19	Daigo Saito	3	2	-	-	6	2	-	17	-	2	32
20	Yukio Matsui	-	-	3	-	-	-	-	-	5	18	26
21	Yuji Saito	10	6	-	-	-	-	-	-	4	-	20
22	Tetsuya Kume	-	-	10	5	-	5	-	-	-	-	20
23	Takahiro Mori	-	-	-	-	5	7	-	7	-	-	19
24	Sayaka Shimoda	4	-	-	-	2	-	-	10	-	-	16
25	Daychapon Toyingcharoen (Pond)	-	1	1	-	-	-	-	-	-	11	13
26	Kazuya Matsukawa	-	-	-	-	-	-	-	4	-	5	9
27	Sumika Kubokawa	-	-	-	-	-	-	8	-	-	-	8
28	Genki Mogami	-	-	-	3	-	-	3	-	-	-	6
29	Lattapon Keawchin (Pop)	-	-	-	-	-	-	-	-	-	4	4
30	Hirotaka Kanou	2	-	-	-	-	-	-	-	2	-	4
31	Yumeto Hatanaka	-	-	-	-	-	-	2	2	-	-	4
32	Koji Yamaguchi	-	-	-	-	-	-	-	3	-	-	3
33	Akinori Utsumi	-	-	-	2	-	-	-	-	-	-	2
34	Takeshi Mogi	-	-	-	-	-	-	-	-	-	1	1

=== Tanso Drivers' Ranking ===
Rank.	Driver	Okuibuki		Tsukuba		Ebisu		Autopolis		Odaiba		Total
Rank.	Driver	RD.1	RD.2	RD.3	RD.4	RD.5	RD.6	RD.7	RD.8	RD.9	RD.10	Total
1	Hideyuki Fujino	12	5	13	6	20	16	6	-	15	20	113
2	Koudai Sobagiri	-	15	20	20	-	8	16	15	14	-	108
3	Seimi Tanaka	20	7	8	8	12	12	14	-	11	15	107
4	Hokuto Matsuyama	8	11	12	1	13	20	13	-	13	12	103
5	Naoki Nakamura	7	-	0	12	10	13	20	20	4	-	86
6	Masao Suenaga	13	14	15	4	-	-	15	-	10	2	73
7	Mitsuru Murakami	11	8	-	-	16	7	4	-	7	16	69
8	Masashi Yokoi	16	20	0	0	4	14	-	5	-	6	65
9	Hiroki Vito	3	13	7	13		5	8	13	-	-	62
10	Yusuke Kitaoka	14	-	-	10	1	15	-	0	16	4	60
11	Tetsuya Hibino	-	16	4	16	3	3	1	16	1	-	60
12	Masato Kawabata	-	6	-	11	14	-	5	10	-	8	54
13	Kojiro Mekuwa	1	-	14	-	11	4	11	-	12	-	53
14	Junya Ishikawa	-	-	-	-	5	11	-	-	20	14	50
15	Chanatpon Kerdpiam (S)	10	3	11	5	15	-	-	-	-	-	44
16	Katsuhiro Ueo	-	10	1	14	-	-	10	7	-	-	42
17	Daigo Saito	5	4	-	-	8	2	-	14	-	5	38
18	Teruyoshi Iwai	4	1	6	-	7	1	-	11	3	-	33
19	Yuji Saito	15	12	-	-	-	-	-	-	5	-	32
20	Ryusei Akiba	-	-	-	-	-	-	7	6	8	7	28
21	Takahiro Mori	-	-	-	-	6	10	-	12	-	-	28
22	Yukio Matsui	-	-	5	-	-	-	-	-	6	13	24
23	Tetsuya Kume	-	-	3	7	-	6	-	-	-	-	16
24	Kazuya Matsukawa	-	-	-	-	-	-	-	4	-	11	15
25	Sumika Kubokawa	-	-	-	-	-	-	12	-	-	-	12
26	Lattapon Keawchin (Pop)	-	-	-	-	-	-	-	-	-	10	10
27	Sayaka Shimoda	6	-	-	-	2	-	-	1	-	-	9
28	Daychapon Toyingcharoen (pon)	-	2	2	-	-	-	-	-	-	3	7
29	Genki Mogami	-	-	-	3	-	-	3	-	-	-	6
30	Hirotaka Kano	2	-	-	-	-	-	-	-	2	-	4
31	Yuto Hatanaka	-	-	-	-	-	-	2	2	-	-	4
32	Koji Yamaguchi	-	-	-	-	-	-	-	3	-	-	3
33	Akinori Utsumi	-	-	-	2	-	-	-	-	-	-	2
34	Takeshi Mogi	-	-	-	-	-	-	-	-	-	1	1

=== Teams' Ranking ===
Rank.	Team	Okuibuki		Tsukuba		Ebisu		Autopolis		Odaiba		Total
Rank.	Team	RD.1	RD.2	RD.3	RD.4	RD.5	RD.6	RD.7	RD.8	RD.9	RD.10	Total
1	TEAM TOYO TIRES DRIFT	6	2	6	6	26	26	6	6	26	20	130
2	+LenoRacing watanabe	15	3	20	3	6	20	6	-	6	26	105
3	D-MAX RACING TEAM	26	13	3	3	3	6	26	6	3	6	95
4	TEAM VALINO × N-style	6	-	0	3	10	15	15	26	20	-	95
5	SHIBATIRE RACING	-	10	3	26	6	10	10	15	3	-	83
6	SHIBATIRE RACING SEIMI STYLE D	6	2	6	6	15	6	20	-	6	3	70
7	VALINO VAZESTRA	-	3	26	10	-	-	6	3	-	-	48
8	Z CHALLENGER × BOOSTAR	-	-	-	-	-	-	6	20	6	10	42
9	Repair Create × 326power	3	2	-	-	20	3	3	-	3	3	37
10	DRIFT STAR Racing × RACING GEAR	10	3	6	3	-	3	3	6	-	-	34
11	TMS Racing Team G-meister	3	-	10	-	3	3	3	3	6	-	31
12	広島トヨタ team DROO-P	-	-	-	-	3	6	-	3	15	3	30
13	TEAM MORI	3	-	-	3	3	3	-	-	10	6	28
14	RS Watanabe SPEED MASTER	6	2	3	-	6	3	-	3	3	-	26
15	FAT FIVE RACING	3	2	-	-	3	3	-	10	-	3	24
16	TEAM RE雨宮 マツモトキヨシ APA	-	-	3	-	-	-	-	-	3	15	21
17	HIRANO TIRE ★ VALINO RACING	3	-	6	3	-	3	-	-	3	-	18
18	GOODRIDE × NEXZTER	3	2	3	6	3	-	-	-	-	-	17
19	Mercury 車楽人 VALINO	3	-	-	-	3	-	-	6	-	-	12
20	TEAM VERTEX × NEXZTER × D2D	-	2	3	-	-	-	-	-	-	6	11
21	CAR SHOP GLITTER × Carlife ORANGE × Next Dream	3	3	-	-	-	-	-	-	3	-	9
22	GP SPORTS	-	-	-	-	3	3	-	3	-	-	9
23	ウエインズトヨタ神奈川 俺だっ！レーシング	-	-	-	3	-	-	3	-	-	-	6
24	NEXZTER DRIVE TO DRIFT	-	-	-	-	-	-	-	-	-	3	3
25	GUNSAI Racing SHIBATIRE	-	-	-	-	-	-	-		-	3	3
26	MUSEE PLATINUM DxD	-	-	-	-	-	-	3	-	-	-	3
27	浅井工業 SP security レーシングチーム	-	-	-	3	-	-	-	-	-	-	3

Notes :

- † - Round 2 is cancelled after the Solo Run due to weather condition, the results was taken from Solo Run results and only half points were awarded.
