= Infiniti Performance Line =

Automaker division

Infiniti S, IPL, Red Sport
- Company type: Marque
- Industry: Automotive industry
- Founded: 2010
- Products: Performance engines and cars; Automotive sports accessories
- Services: Research and development
- Owner: Nissan
- Parent: Infiniti

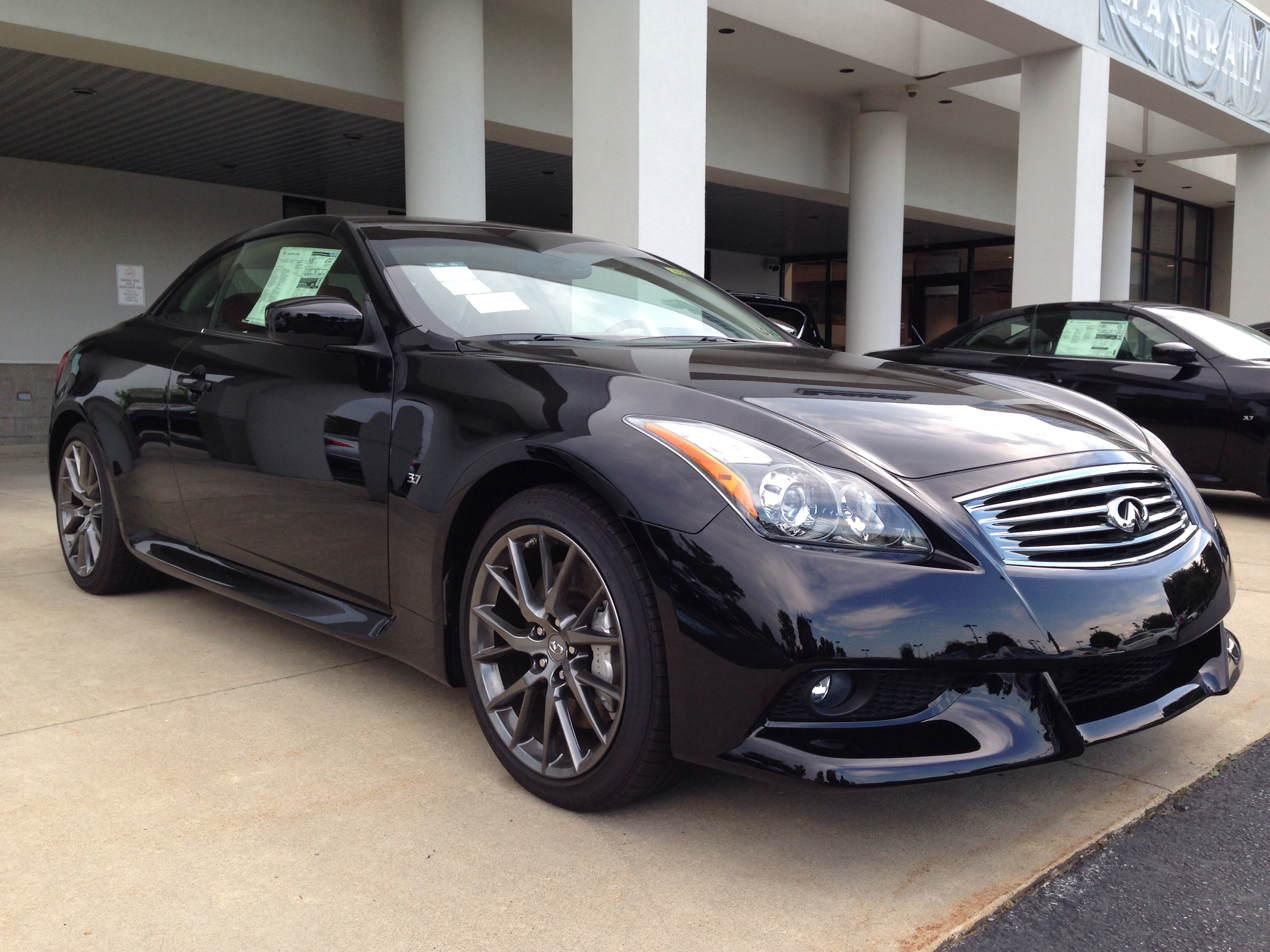
Infiniti Q60 IPL

The Infiniti Performance Line (IPL), Red Sport and Infiniti S marques represent the high-performance divisions of cars produced by Infiniti. In July 2010 Infiniti released its new performance division, Infiniti Performance Line (IPL). The debut IPL offering is the G37 Coupe for 2011 model year, and later the G37 Convertible.

== Infiniti Performance Line ==
The Infiniti G37 (later branded as the Infiniti Q60) were offered as IPL models. The IPL models featured a retuned engine producing 348 hp (260 kW) (353 PS) and 276 lb-ft (374 NM) of torque. Performance improvements included a redesigned exhaust system, sportier suspension tuning, as well as a more direct steering feel. Design changes were made to the exterior including more aggressive front/rear bumpers and sideskirts, sportier 19 inch alloy wheels, and larger exhaust tips. Inside, the G37 IPL has red Monaco leather seats. The IPL G37 Coupe and Convertible are only available in 3 colors; Graphite Shadow gray metallic, Moonlight white (QAA) and Malbec Black. Like the regular models, the G37 IPL was also renamed Q60 IPL beginning 2014 model year.

== Infiniti S, Red Sport ==
Infiniti offers an "S" and "Red Sport" variant on many of their vehicles, which includes sportier styling on both the exterior and interior, more horsepower, and a firmer suspension.

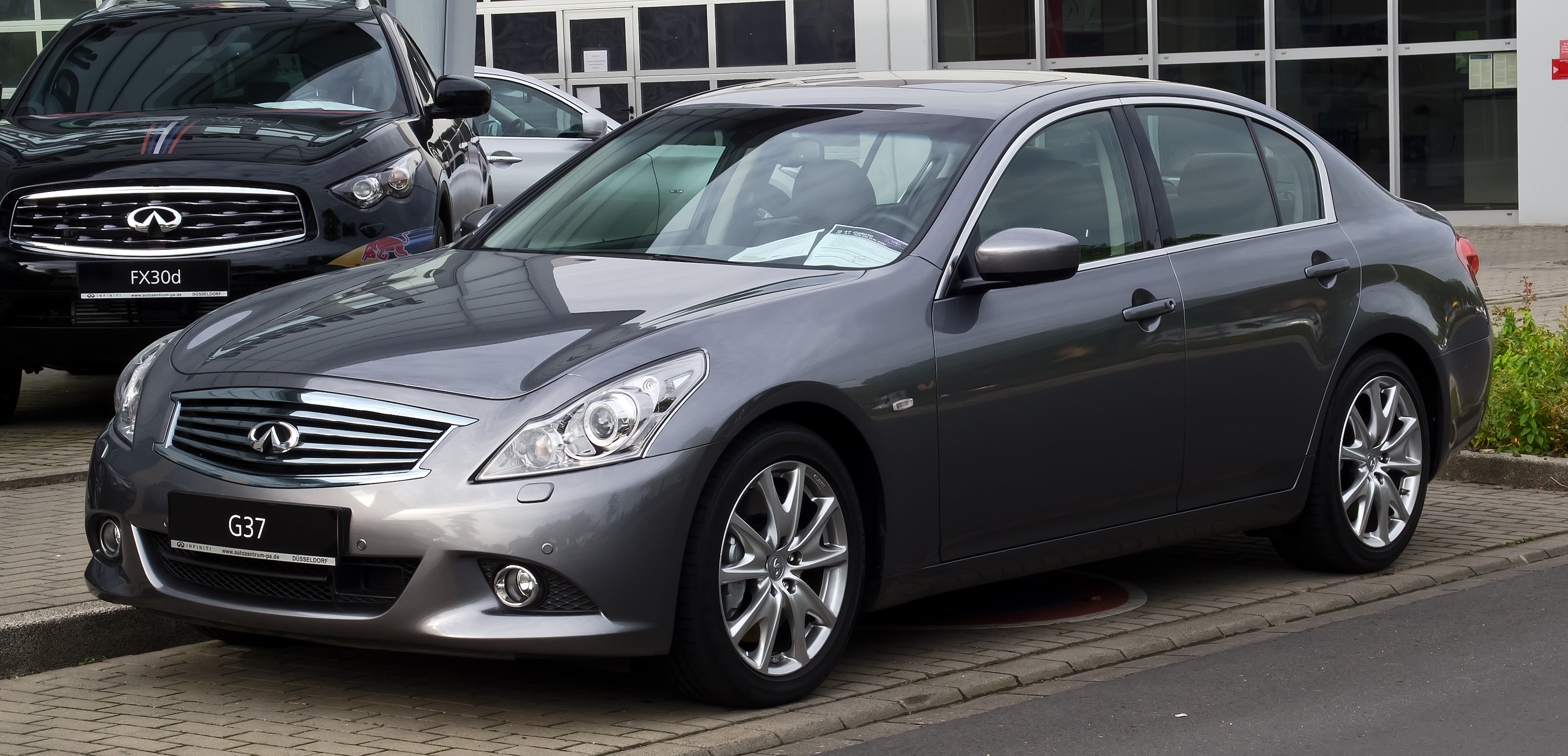
Infiniti G37 S

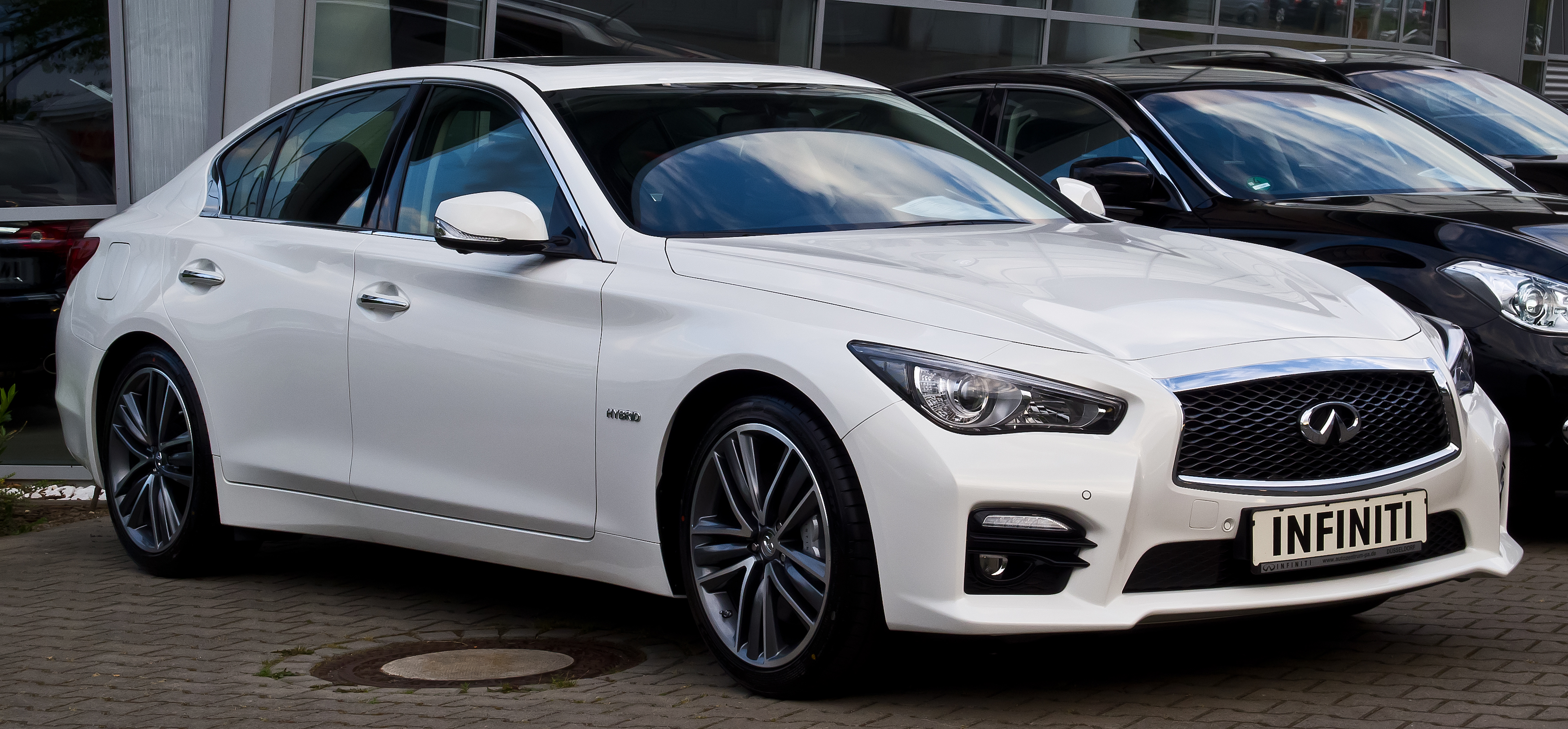
Infiniti Q50 S Hybrid

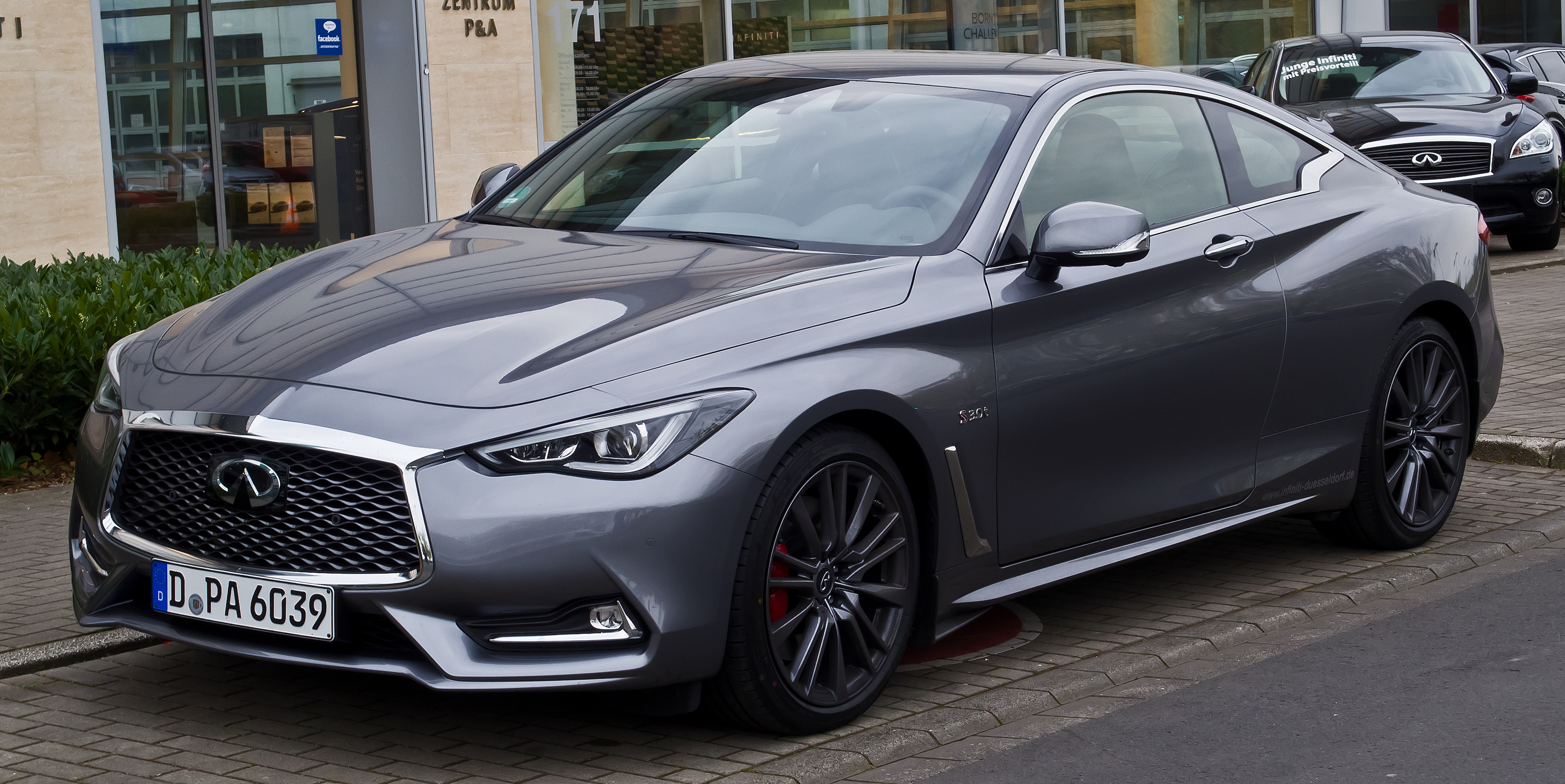
Infiniti Q60 S
