= Nissan VR engine =

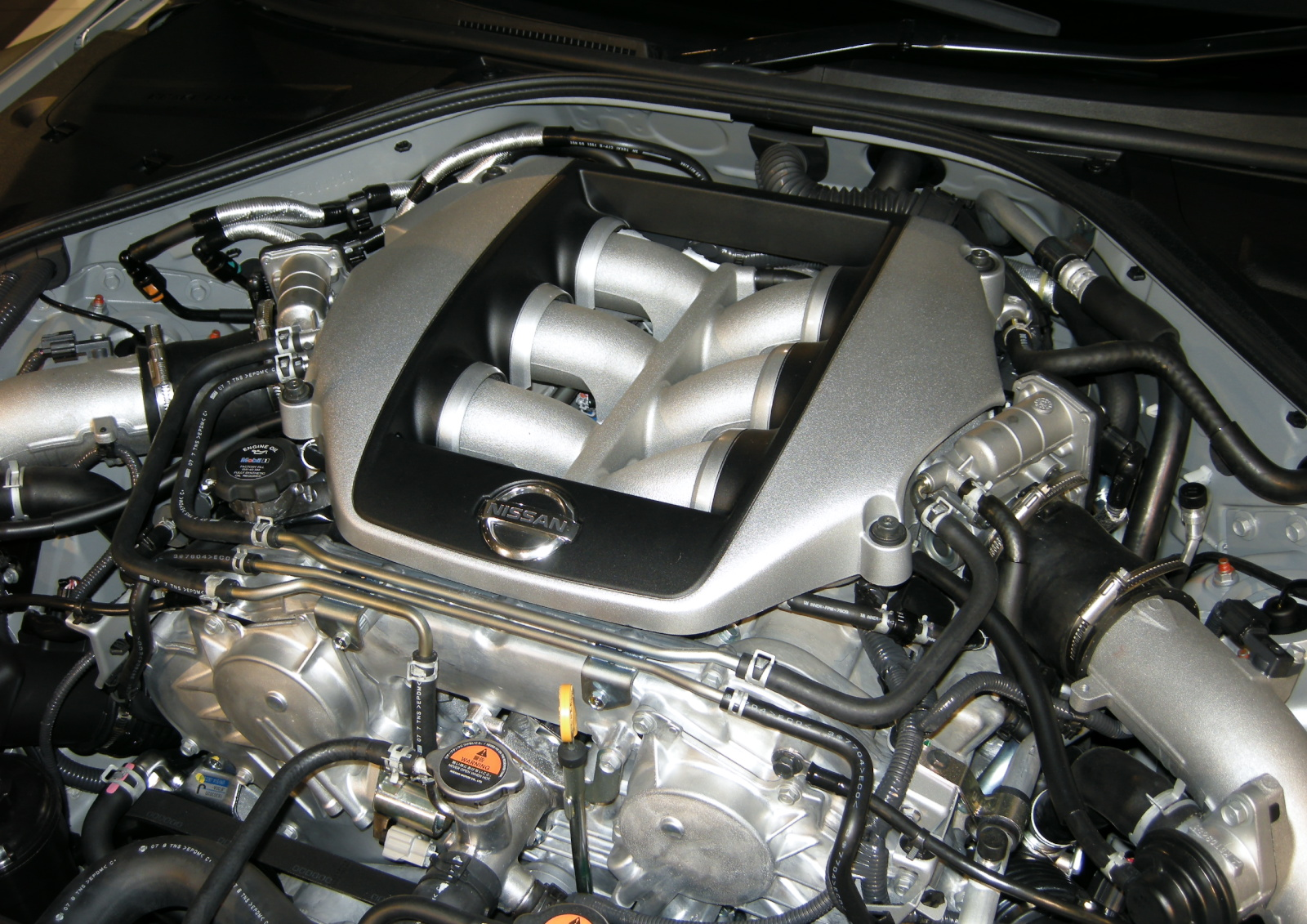

Overview
- Manufacturer: Nissan (Nissan Machinery)
- Designer: Naoki Nakada
- Production: 2007–present

Layout
- Configuration: 60° V6
- Displacement: 3.0 L (2,997 cc); 3.5 L (3,492 cc); 3.8 L (3,799 cc)
- Cylinder bore: 86.0 mm (3.39 in); 95.5 mm (3.76 in)
- Piston stroke: 86.0 mm (3.39 in); 100.2 mm (3.94 in); 88.4 mm (3.48 in)
- Cylinder block material: Aluminum
- Cylinder head material: Aluminum
- Valvetrain: DOHC, 4 valves per cylinder
- Compression ratio: 9.0:1, 10.3:1

Combustion
- Turbocharger: Twin-turbo charged
- Fuel system: Multi-point (VR38DETT)/Direct injection (VR30DDTT/VR35DDTT)
- Fuel type: Gasoline
- Cooling system: Water-cooled

Dimensions
- Dry weight: 429.5 lb (194.8 kg) (VR30DDTT); 608 lb (276 kg) (VR38DETT)

Chronology
- Predecessor: Nissan VQ engine, Nissan RB engine

The VR is a series of twin-turbo DOHC V6 automobile engines from Nissan with displacements of 3.0, 3.5, and 3.8 L. An evolution of the widely successful VQ series, it also draws on developments from the VRH, JGTC, and Nissan R390 GT1 Le Mans racing engines.

== VR30 series ==
=== VR30DDTT ===
Announced by Infiniti on December 15, 2015 the VR30DDTT was first made available in the Infiniti Q50 sedan, followed by the Infiniti Q60 coupé a year later. Both platforms come in a 300 and 400 hp (224 and 298 kW) version. It is on the Ward's 10 Best Engines list for 2017 and 2018.

Features:

- Aluminium block with arc sprayed mirror coating to cylinder bores
- Aluminium cylinder head
- Lightweight resin intake and lower oil pan
- Compact twin direct-mount turbos with integrated exhaust manifold and electronic wastegate actuator
- Twin water-to-air charge coolers with one or two water pumps for the 300 hp (224 kW) and 400 hp (298 kW) variants, respectively
- Electronically controlled variable displacement oil pump
- Intake: electronic variable valve timing Control (VTC)
- Exhaust: hydraulic continuously variable VTC
- Fuel system: direct injection

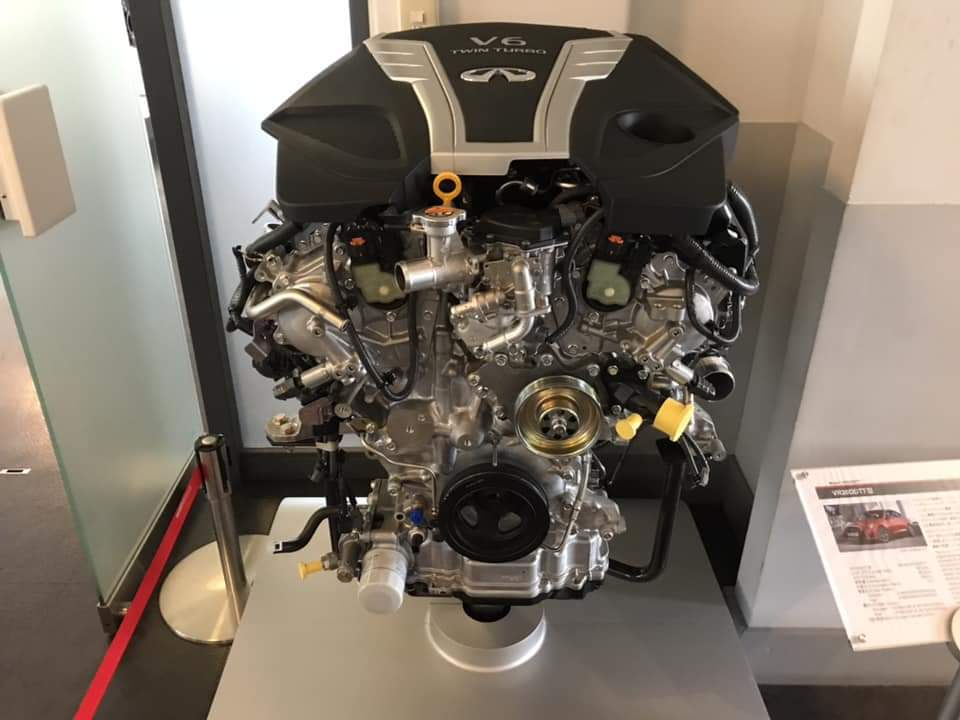
Nissan VR30DDTT Engine at Nissan's Engine Museum in Yokohama, Japan

Applications:

Years	Model	Power output
2016–2024	Infiniti Q50	300–400 hp (224–298 kW)
2017–2022	Infiniti Q60	300–400 hp (224–298 kW)
2019–present	Nissan Skyline	300–400 hp (224–298 kW)
2022–present	Nissan Z	400–420 hp (298–313 kW)
Racing
2025–present	Dacia Sandrider	355 hp (265 kW)

=== Production ===
Production of the VR30DDTT engine began in 2016 at the powertrain plant in Iwaki, Fukushima.

== VR35 series ==
=== VR35DDTT ===
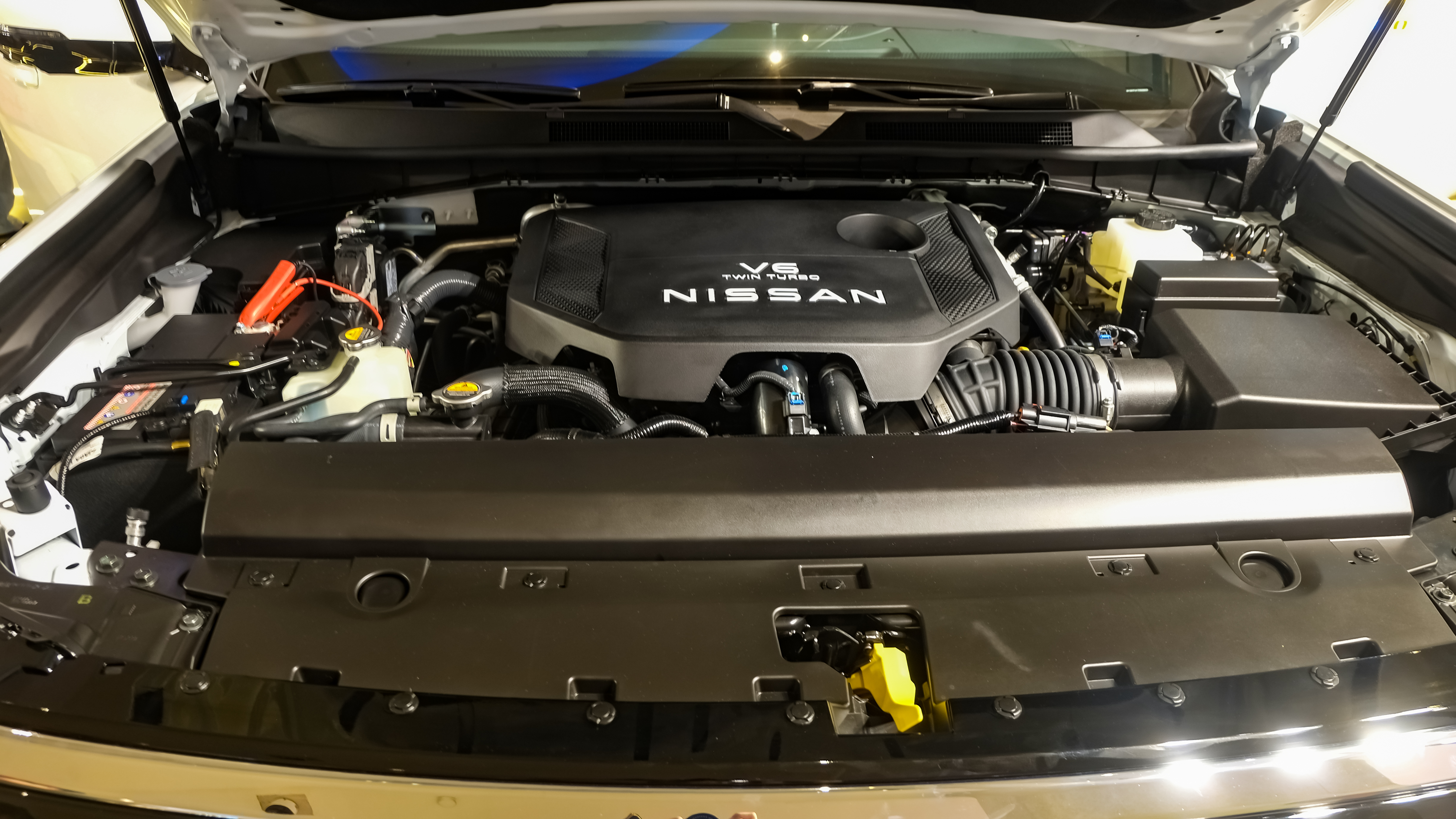
VR35DDTT

The VR35DDTT was announced in March 2024 for the third-generation Infiniti QX80. It is also used in the related Nissan Patrol/Armada. It is a larger version of the VR30DDTT and replaces the 5.6-liter VK56 V8 engine in Nissan's largest automobiles. A bore and stroke of 86 mm × 100.2 mm (3.39 in × 3.94 in) makes for an overall displacement of 3.5 L (3,492 cc; 213.1 cu in).

Applications:

Years	Model	Power output	Torque	Market
2024–present	Infiniti QX80 (Z63)	336 kW; 456 PS (450 hp) at 5,600 rpm	700 N⋅m (516 lb⋅ft) at 3,600 rpm	North America
2024–present	Nissan Patrol/Armada (Y63)	317–369 kW (425–495 hp; 431–502 PS) at 5,600 rpm	700 N⋅m (516 lb⋅ft) at 3,600 rpm	Australia, Middle East, North America, Philippines

== VR38 series ==
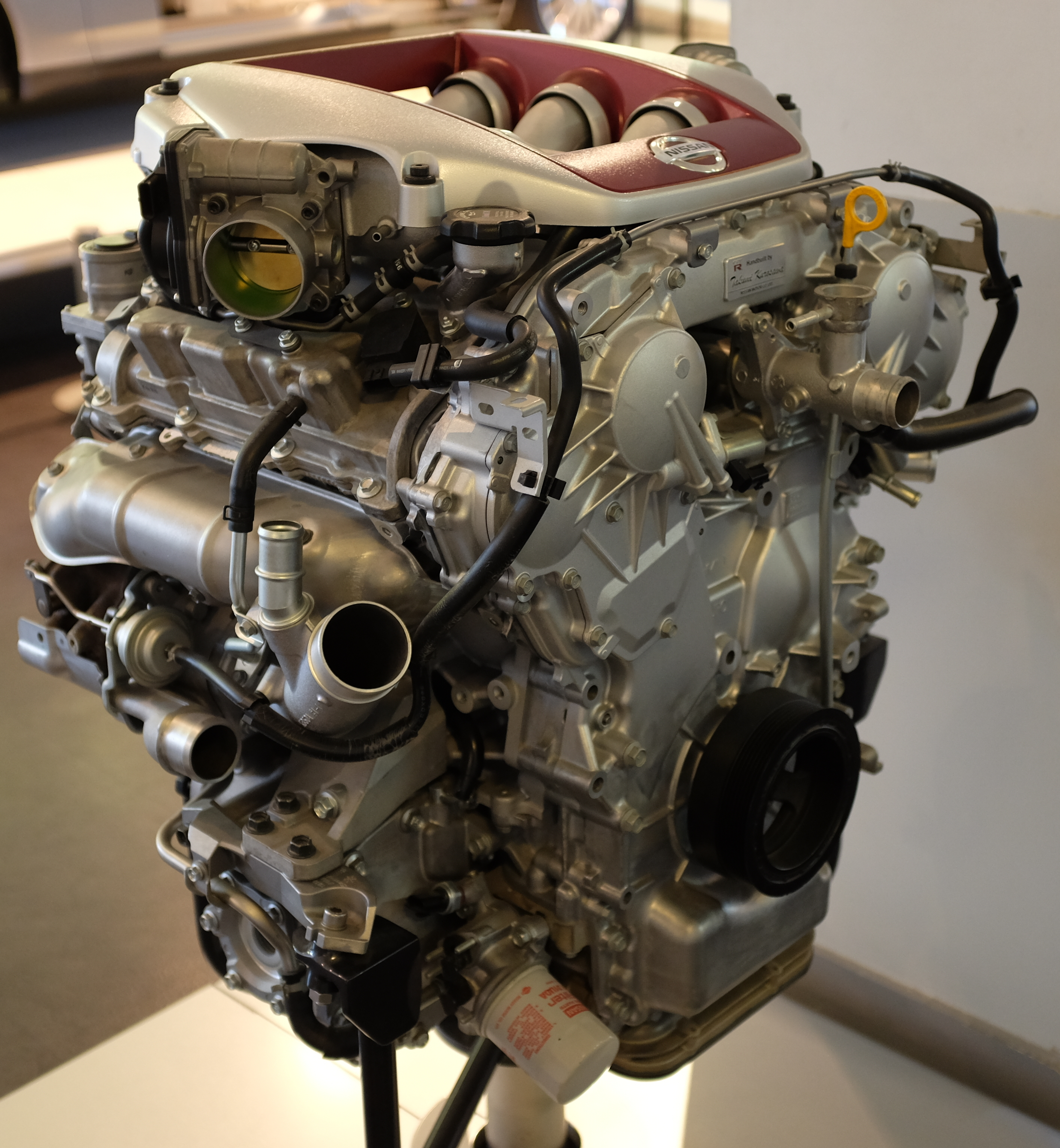
Nissan VR38DETT Engine at Nissan Engine Museum in Yokohama, Japan

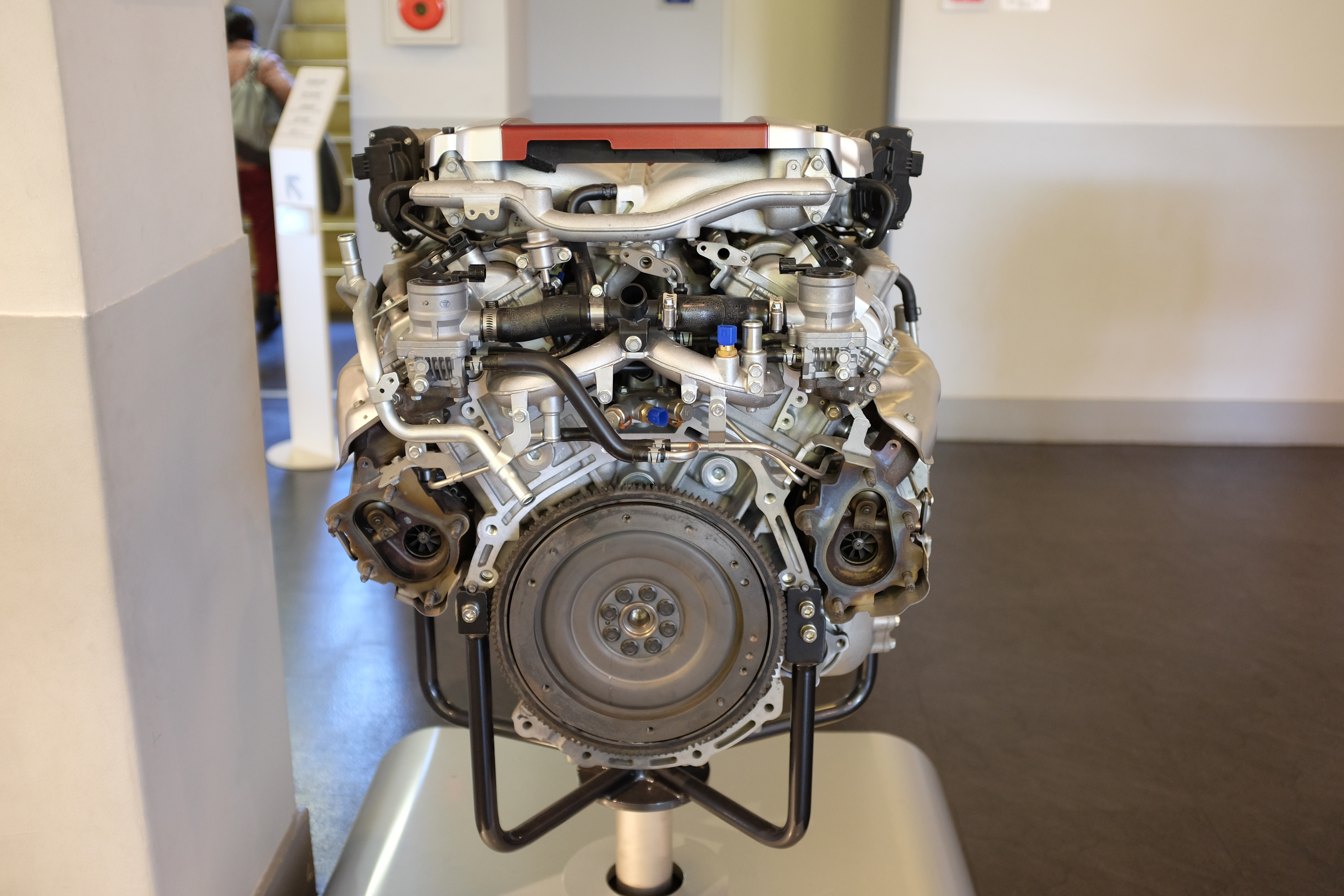

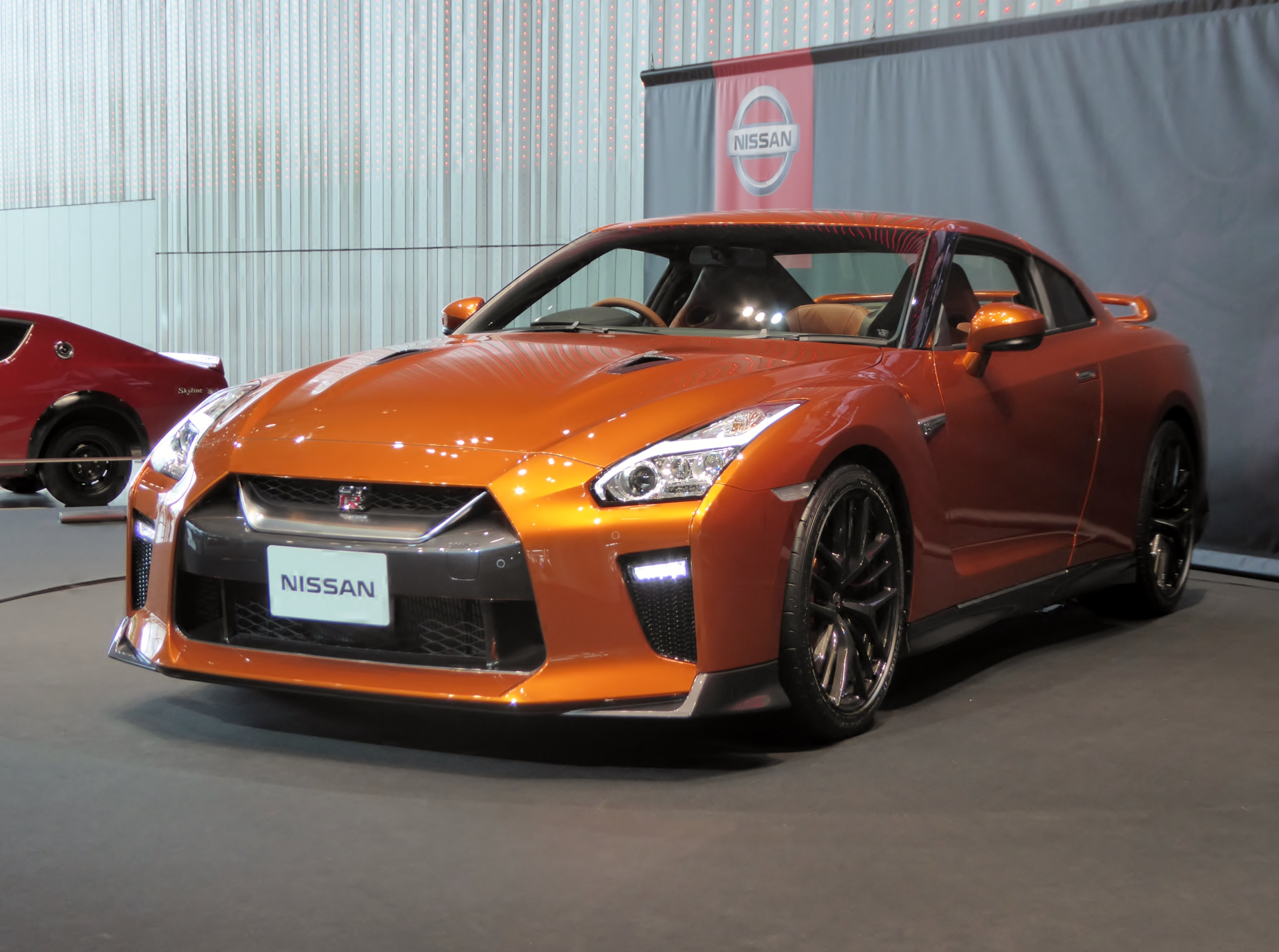
Nissan GT-R (R35) is powered by the VR38DETT

=== VR38DETT ===
Designated the VR38DETT by Nissan, the engine was originally developed and used from 2007–2025 in the Nissan GT-R. It is the first engine produced in Nissan's VR series, and the most powerful production engine produced by a Japanese manufacturer.

The VR38DETT featured 24 valves controlled by dual overhead camshafts (2 per cylinder head) with variable valve timing on the intake only. The block is cast aluminium with 0.15 mm (0.0059 in) plasma-sprayed cylinder liner bores. This coating provides a hard protective layer for the piston rings to slide on as the piston moves up and down during its power cycle. The turbine housings for the two IHI turbochargers are integrated into the exhaust manifolds to decrease weight and bolster vehicle balance. The engine also features a pressurized lubrication system controlled thermostatically. The VR38DETT is equipped with a feedback control system that changes air fuel ratio depending on the engine load which has a significant effect on reducing the fuel consumption.

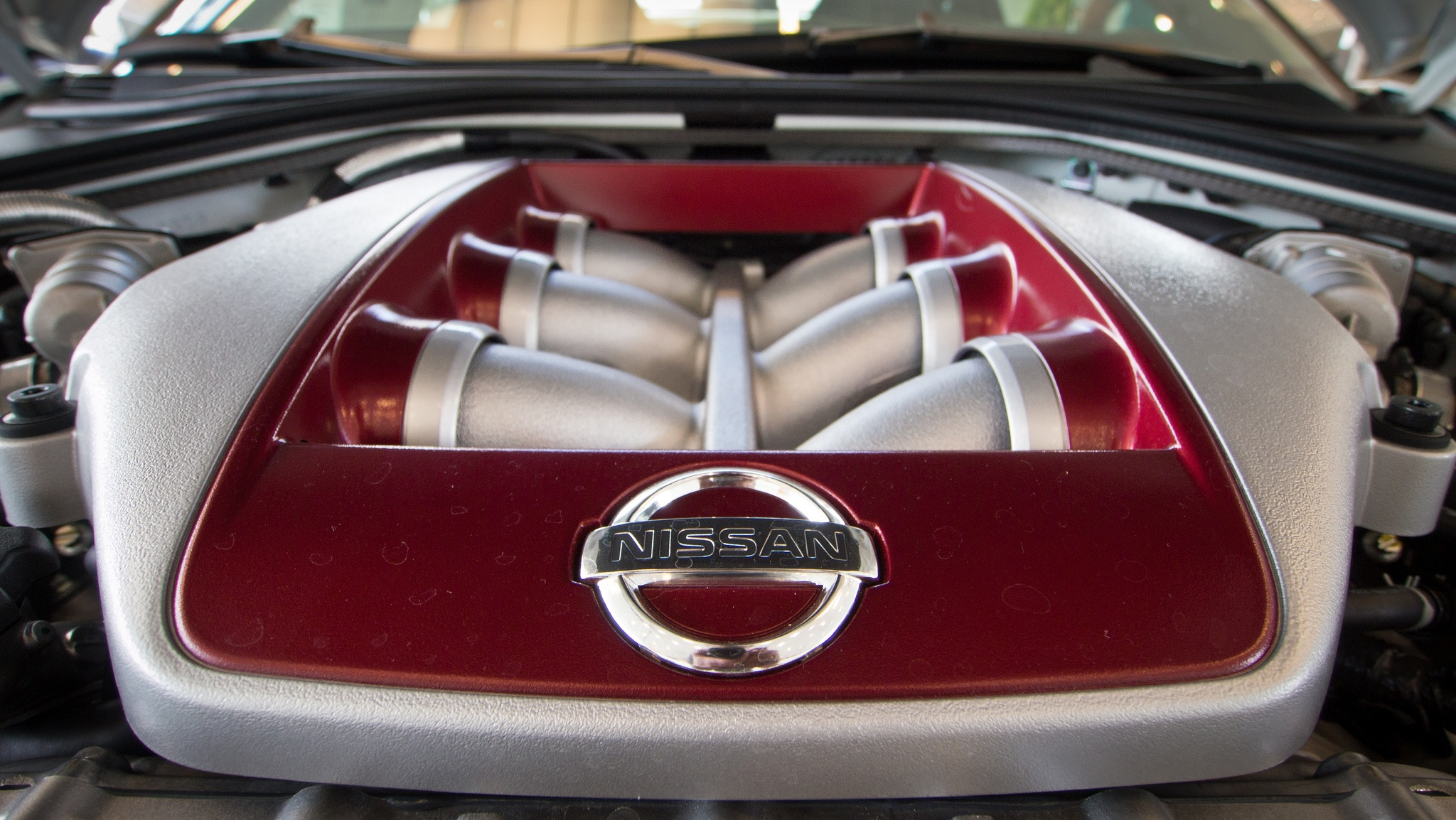
Since 2011, all VR38DETTs produced came with a red top engine cover in the GT-R

Fully equipped with the first set of catalytic converters, turbos, all of the engine driven accessories, front differential assembly, and turbo outlet pipes, the engine weighed 608 lb (276 kg).

Other pertinent features of the VR38DETT include:

- Continuously variable valve timing control system (CVTCS) on intake valves
- Aluminum cylinder block with high-endurance/low-friction plasma-sprayed bores
- Iridium-tipped spark plugs
- Electronic drive-by-wire throttle
- Multi port fuel injection
- Pressurized lubrication system with thermostatically controlled cooling and magnesium oil sump
- Fully symmetrical dual intake and low back-pressure exhaust system
- Secondary air intake system to rapidly heat catalysts to peak cleaning efficiency
- 50 State LEV2/ULEV

Applications:

Years	Model	Power output
2007–2025	Nissan GT-R	473–710 hp (353–529 kW)
2023–present	Praga Bohema (Note: Tuned by Litchfield Motors in the United Kingdom, and re-branded as PL38DETT. Features a new dry-sump oil system, exhaust system and larger turbochargers.)	700 hp (522 kW)
Concept
2011	Nissan Juke-R (5 units were produced)	542 hp (404 kW)
2014	Infiniti Q50 Eau Rouge Prototype	560 hp (418 kW)
2025	Infiniti QX80 R-spec	1,000 hp (746 kW)
Racing
2012–present	Nissan GT-R Nismo GT3	523–592 hp (390–441 kW)
2014–2021	Renault Sport R.S. 01	542 hp (404 kW)
2017–2019	Ligier Nissan DPi	599 hp (447 kW)
2024–present	Nissan Fairlady Z GT300	542–592 hp (404–441 kW)

=== VR38DETT NISMO Engine Tuning Menu Concept (2016) ===
It is a version of VR38DETT engine used in Nissan GT-R, with GT3-spec camshaft, connecting rod and connecting rod bolt, intercooler, intercooler piping, turbocharger, NISMO 1st and 2nd catalyzers, titanium muffler.

The engine was unveiled in 2016 Tokyo Auto Salon.

=== Production ===
The engines were hand built by only a total of nine specially trained mechanics called "Takumi Craftsmens" since its introduction in 2007, on a special line at Nissan's Yokohama plant and their names are badged on each engine.

== Engine reference ==
Engine code	Vehicle	Year	Displacement	Bore x stroke	Weight	C.R.	Max. power	Max. torque	Features
VR30DDTT	Infiniti Q50/Infiniti Q60; Nissan Skyline; Nissan Z (RZ34)	2016-present	2,997 cc (3.0 L; 182.9 cu in)	86 mm × 86 mm (3.39 in × 3.39 in)	approx.429.5 lb (194.8 kg)	10.3:1	300 hp (224 kW) @ 6,400 rpm 400–420 hp (298–313 kW) @ 6,400 rpm (High Output)	295 lb⋅ft (400 N⋅m) @ 1,600-5,200 rpm 350–384 lb⋅ft (475–521 N⋅m) @ 1,600-5,200 rpm (High output)	DOHC per bank Variable inlet and outlet cam phasing Twin Turbo; High pressure multi-split direct injection
VR35DDTT	Nissan Patrol/ Infiniti QX80	2024-present	3,492 cc (3.5 L; 213.1 cu in)	86 mm × 100.2 mm (3.39 in × 3.94 in)	-	10.3:1	425–450 hp (317–336 kW) @5,600 rpm	516 lb⋅ft (700 N⋅m) @ 3,600 rpm	
VR38DETT	Nissan GT-R	2007–2025	3,799 cc (3.8 L; 231.8 cu in)	95.5 mm × 88.4 mm (3.76 in × 3.48 in)	approx.608 lb (276 kg)	9.0:1	480–565 hp (358–421 kW) @ 6,400/ 6,800 rpm 600 hp (447 kW) @ 6,800 rpm (NISMO); 711 hp (530 kW) (GT-R50)	430–467 lb⋅ft (583–633 N⋅m) @ 3,200-6,000/ 3,300-5,800 rpm 481 lb⋅ft (652 N⋅m) @ 3,200-5,800 rpm (NISMO); 575 lb⋅ft (780 N⋅m) (GT-R50)	DOHC per bank Variable inlet cam phasing Twin Turbo

== See also ==
- Nissan
- List of Nissan engines
- VQ Series
- Infiniti Q50
- Infiniti Q60
- Nissan Skyline
- Nissan Z (RZ34)
- Nissan GT-R
