= Infiniti Q60 =

Nissan luxury car, 2013 to 2022

The Infiniti Q60 is a 2-door luxury coupe manufactured by Japanese automaker Nissan. It is the successor to the Infiniti G coupe and convertible. The Q60 nameplate was first used as a rebadging of Infiniti G Line. A new version was introduced in early 2016, as a 2017 model.

== First generation (V36; 2013) ==
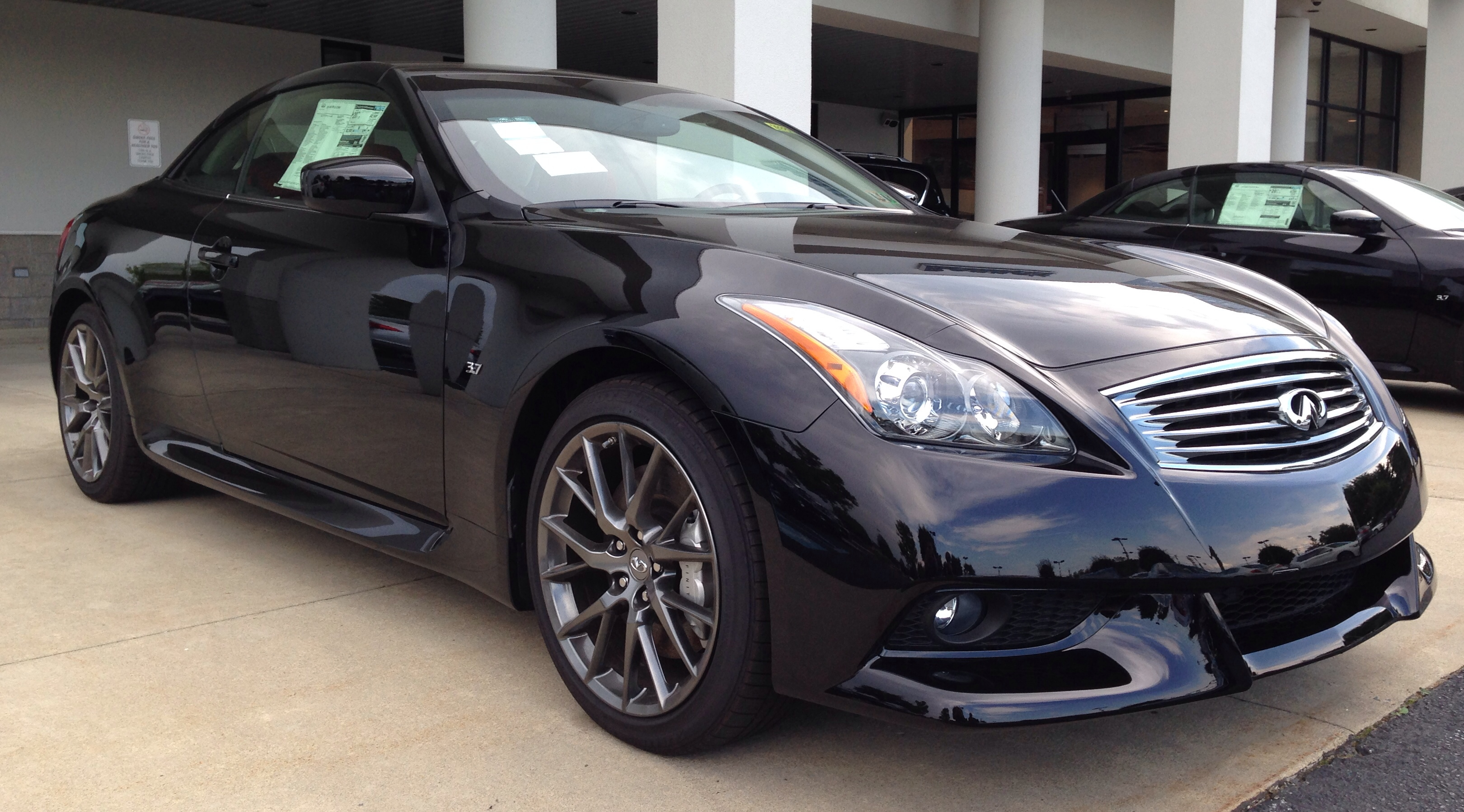
Infiniti Q60 IPL

The first-generation Infiniti Q60 was based on the fourth generation (V36) G Coupe. This came about when Infiniti former president Johan de Nysschen cited the need for "a new identity and direction to promote consumer familiarity with our model range as we expand the portfolio." Beginning in 2014, all passenger cars would be "Q" followed by a two-digit number. Those numbers would correspond to the vehicle’s position in the Infiniti hierarchy.

== Second generation (V37; 2016) ==
Infiniti Q60
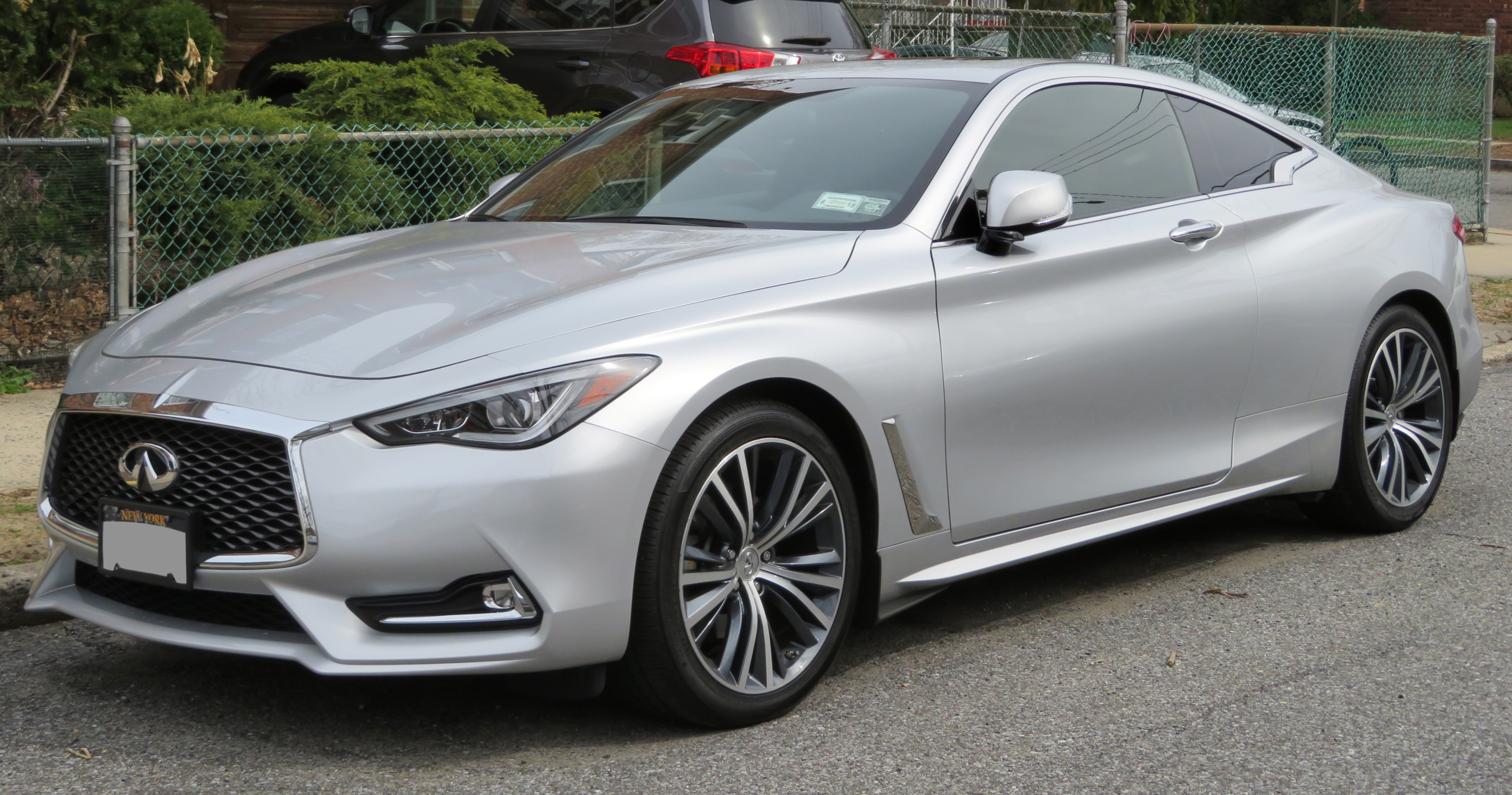
- Infiniti Q60

Overview
- Manufacturer: Nissan
- Model code: V37
- Production: 2016–2022
- Model years: 2017–2022
- Assembly: Japan: Kaminokawa, Tochigi

Body and chassis
- Class: Compact executive car (D)
- Body style: 2-door coupe
- Layout: Front mid-engine, rear-wheel-drive / all-wheel-drive
- Platform: Nissan FM platform
- Related: Infiniti Q50

Powertrain
- Engine: 2.0 L M274 DE20 AL turbo I4; 3.0 L VR30DDTT twin-turbo V6
- Transmission: 7-speed 7R01 automatic 7-speed 7G-Tronic automatic

Dimensions
- Wheelbase: 2,850 mm (112.2 in)
- Length: 4,685–4,690 mm (184.4–184.6 in)
- Width: 1,850 mm (72.8 in)
- Height: 1,385–1,395 mm (54.5–54.9 in)
- Curb weight: 1,700–1,836 kg (3,748–4,048 lb)

Chronology
- Predecessor: Infiniti G (renamed from)

The second-generation Infiniti Q60 was unveiled at the 2015 North American International Auto Show as a concept. A year later, Infiniti unveiled the production version at the 2016 North American International Auto Show, followed by the European version debuting at the 2016 Geneva Motor Show.

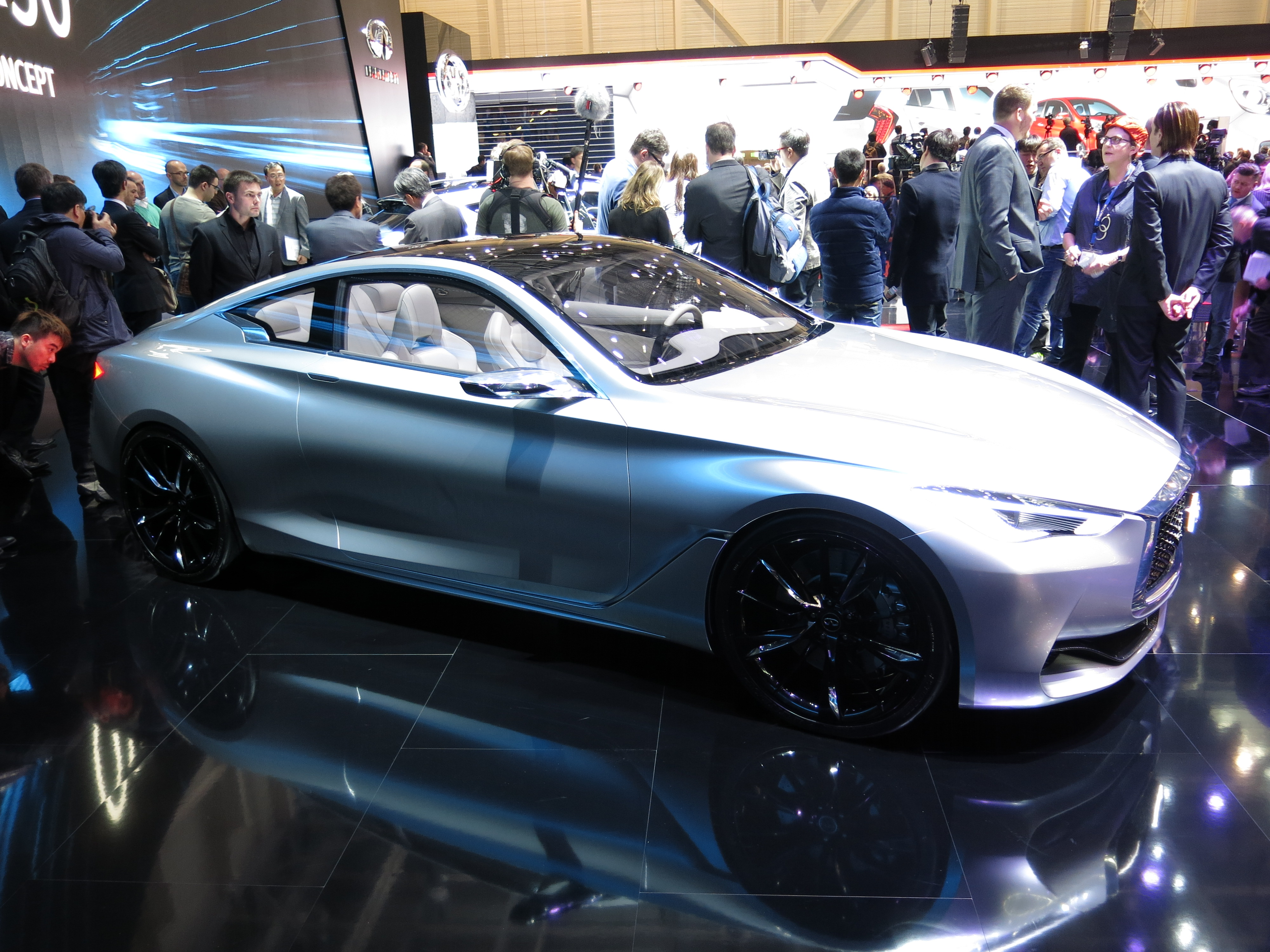
Infiniti Q60 concept at the 2015 Geneva Motor Show

American models went on sale as model year vehicles for 2017. Early powertrains included the Mercedes-sourced 2.0t and 2.0t AWD, and the 300 horsepower (224 kW; 304 PS) 3.0t and 3.0t AWD in August 2016; followed by the Red Sport 400 and Red Sport 400 AWD later in September 2016. 3.0t Sport and 3.0t Sport AWD trims went on sale in December 2016. European models went on sale in October 2016 as a model year 2017 vehicles. Early models included 2.0t, followed by the 3.0t in 406 PS (299 kW; 400 hp) tune.

The second-generation Q60 received many major upgrades like a lower and wider body, introduction of second-generation Direct Adaptive Steering, a drive mode selector with a custom settings profile, standard hydraulic electronic rack and pinion power steering system, introduction of Dynamic Digital Suspension, a retuned seven speed automatic transmission, active grille shutters on the V6 engine models, and turbocharged engines for the first time. The Q60 Convertible was discontinued for the second generation.

Following the redesign, the Q60 has a drag coefficient of 0.28, and zero front and rear lift. This allows the vehicle to remain stable at high speeds and in crosswind conditions. This is assisted by the use of all-new active grille shutters, which help balance the engine's cooling requirements while also enhancing aerodynamics. The grille shutters remain closed under normal use, and open when greater cooling performance is required.

The Q60 is available in several trims: Pure, Luxe, Sport and Red Sport 400.

Initially, the only engine choice for the Pure and Luxe trims is a Mercedes-Benz sourced 2.0L turbocharged engine, while the Sport and Red Sport receive the all new 3.0L turbocharged Nissan VR engine. The engine is the same for both the Sport and Red Sport trims, however, the Red Sport model is tuned to make 400 hp (298 kW; 406 PS). The Sport trim's output is 300 hp (224 kW; 304 PS). All engines are mated to a 7-speed automatic gearbox, and the 3.0t is also equipped with dual transmission coolers. There is no longer a manual transmission option for the second generation.

Q60 Red Sport 400 is based on Q60 3.0t coupe. Additional features include 14" brake rotors on the front and 13.8" rotors on the rear, opposed 2 and 4 piston red calipers, sport tuned Digital Dynamic Suspension, semi-aniline leather appointed sport seats, aluminium accented pedals and paddle shifters, unique dual brushed satin finish Red Sport 400 exhaust tips, exclusive 20-inch sport aluminium-alloy wheels (staggered for RWD models) and chrome finished red 'S' exterior sport badging on the trunk and front fenders.

The Q60 also offers slew of new technologies and safety features. For 2018 model year, the ProAssist Package consisted of Predictive Forward Collision Warning, Forward Emergency Braking with Pedestrian Detection, Blind Spot Warning, Around View Monitor with Moving Object Detection, front and rear parking sensors, rain-sensing wipers and Backup Collision Intervention with Rear Cross Traffic Alert. The ProActive Package adds adaptive cruise control, lane departure warning and prevention, Blind Spot Intervention, Distance Control Assist, a more advanced climate control system with Plasmacluster and Grape Polyphenol filter, auto leveling adaptive front headlights with high beam assist, front seat pre-crash seatbelts and Direct Adaptive Steering.

=== Neiman Marcus Edition ===
For 2017, Infiniti offered the Q60 Neiman Marcus Edition, limited to 50 units and based on the Infiniti Q60 Red Sport 400, for the United States. The vehicle went on sale on February 11, 2017. It featured a Solar Mica painted body, carbon fiber mirror housings, a rear spoiler, white semi-aniline leather interior, brushed aluminum trim, a custom AUTODROMO weekender bag, a personalized plaque in a special compartment that features the car's VIN, and a Premium Coverking car cover with Neiman Marcus graphics.

=== Project Black S ===
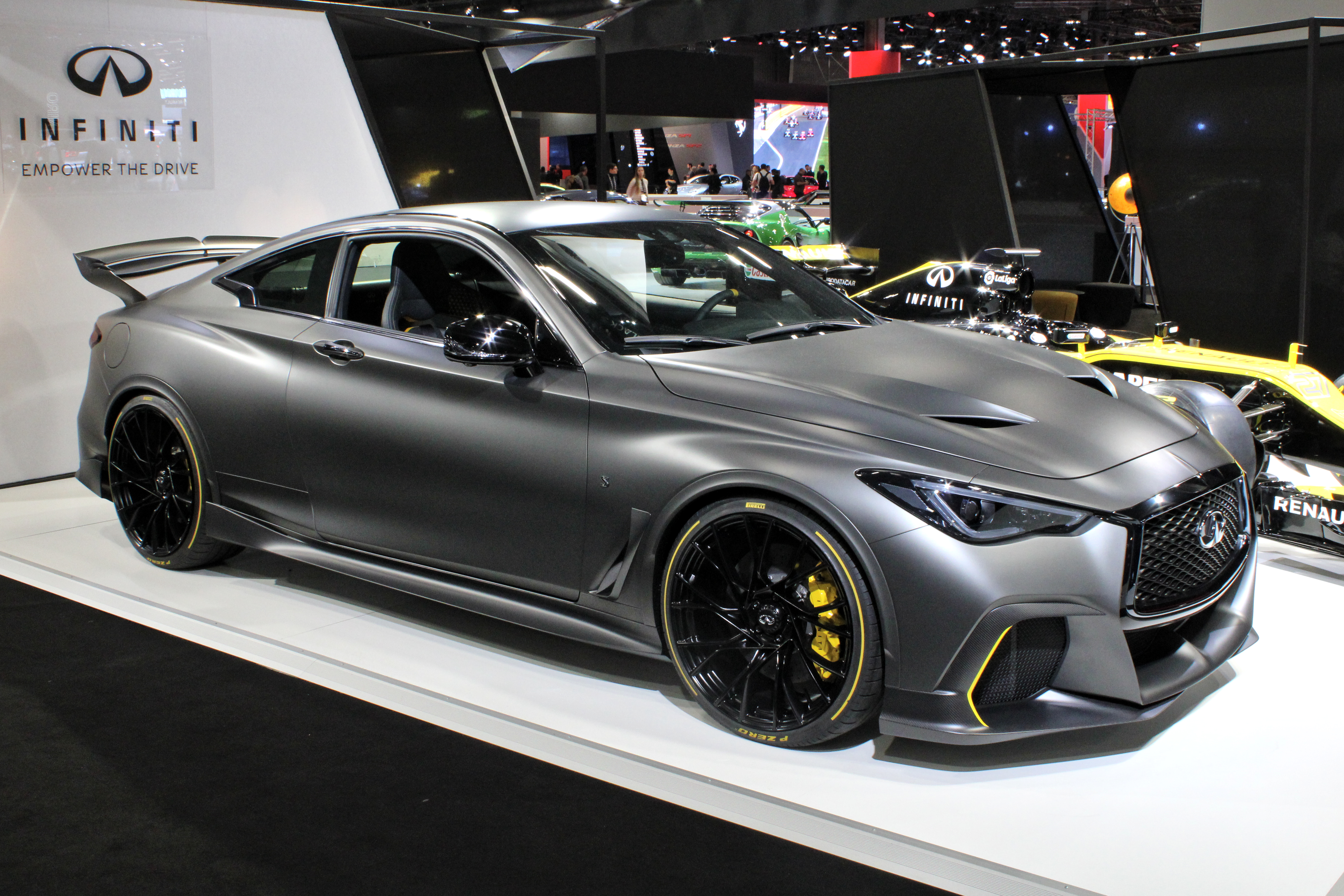
2017 Infiniti Q60 Project Black S Concept

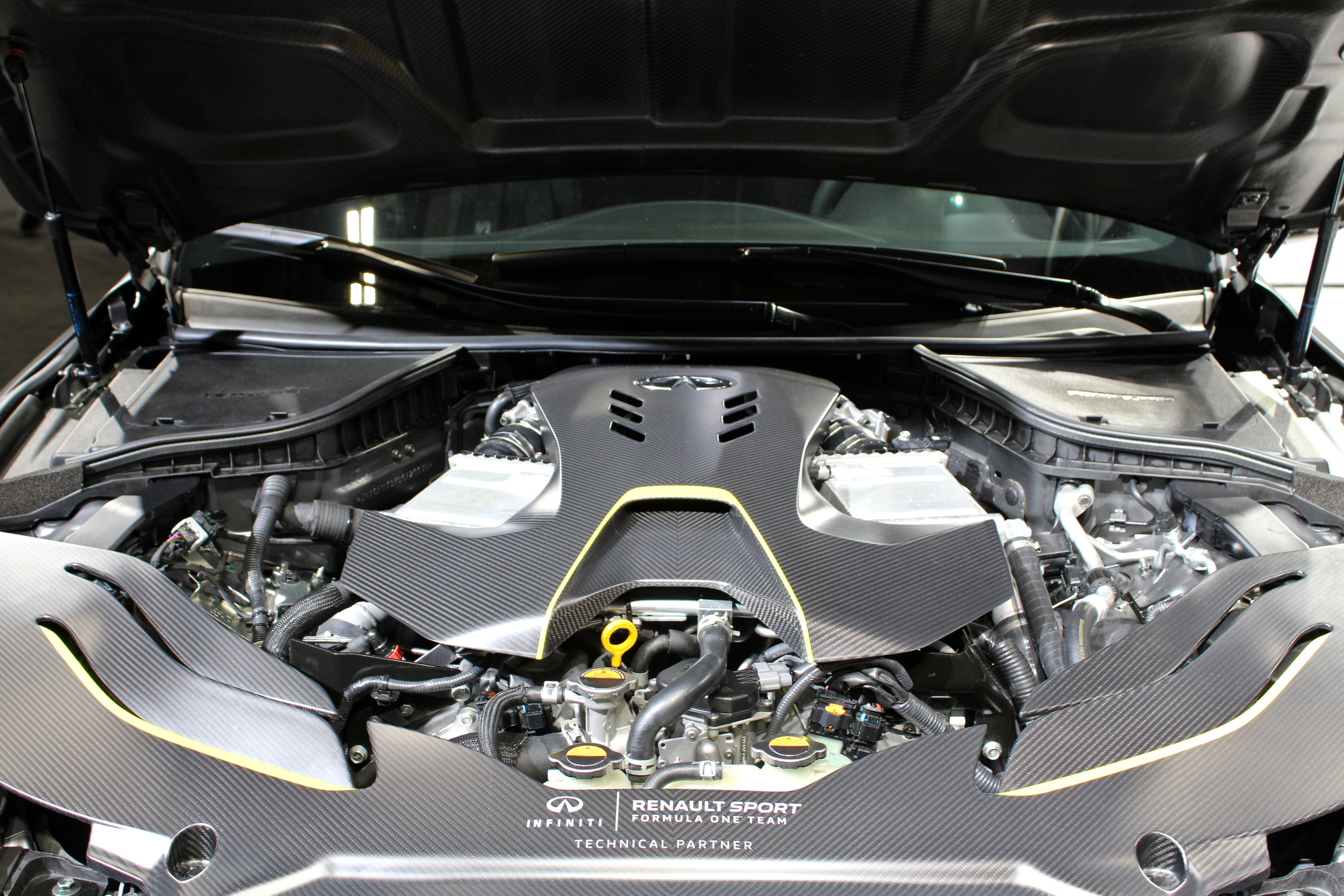
Engine

The Project Black S is a concept dual hybrid Q60 developed with Renault Sport Formula One Team. It was unveiled at the 2017 Geneva International Motor Show. It features a Formula One inspired energy regeneration system with a dual motor/generator unit and battery pack. Engine power specifications were not disclosed, however, it is expected to come with the Red Sport 400 engine. The first motor traction motor/generator mounts is attached end of transmission, providing direct power to the rear wheels. The second motor/generator is attached to the turbocharger, to help spool it up instantly to eliminate turbo lag at lower engine speeds. Once at higher revs, when the exhaust is flowing through the turbine and is up to speed, it instead uses the turbine's rotation to generate electricity to recharge the battery. It is estimated to have an output of 500 hp (370 kW; 510 PS) from the V6 engine and two electric motors. It will also feature braking-by-wire, but will not feature the Red Sport’s controversial steering-by-wire system, instead using an electric motor-driven unit.

The vehicle also features a center-mounted titanium twin exhaust system and lightweight 21-inch forged wheels, each mounted with 245/35R21 Pirelli P Zero tires. It also features a new racing inspired vents at the front framing the front bumper, and a rear diffuser and wing, aimed to significantly increase rear downforce of the car.

In an interview conducted by Car Advice, Infiniti’s director of product strategy and motorsport, Tommaso Volpe, revealed that the company was counting down the prototype's imminent unveiling. He mentioned that several key suppliers were just weeks away from delivering important components like electric motors, as well as other key parts for the twin-turbo V6 engine. An updated version of Project Black S was unveiled at the 2018 Paris Motor Show. It features new yellow accents on the front bumper, tires and spoiler, new wheels and a revised hood. Infiniti was expected to release more details about the engine at the Paris Motor Show as well. However, in March 2021 Infiniti confirmed that the project had been canceled.

=== Engines ===
Gasoline engines
Model	Years	Engine	Power at rpm	Torque at rpm	0–60 mph (0–97 km/h)	CO2 Emissions
2.0t	2016–2022	1,991 cc (121 cu in) I4 turbo (Mercedes-Benz M 274 DE 20 AL)	211 PS (155 kW; 208 hp) @ 5500	350 N⋅m (258 lb⋅ft) @ 1500-3500	6.9 s	156 g/km
2.0t AWD	2016–2022	1,991 cc (121 cu in) I4 turbo (Mercedes-Benz M 274 DE 20 AL)	211 PS (155 kW; 208 hp) @ 5500	350 N⋅m (258 lb⋅ft) @ 1500-3500	7.4 s	156 g/km
3.0t	2016–2022	2,997 cc (183 cu in) V6 twin-turbo Nissan VR30DDTT	304 PS (224 kW; 300 hp) @ 6400	400 N⋅m (295 lb⋅ft) @ 1600-5200	5.2 s	210 g/km
3.0t AWD	2016–2022	2,997 cc (183 cu in) V6 twin-turbo Nissan VR30DDTT	304 PS (224 kW; 300 hp) @ 6400	400 N⋅m (295 lb⋅ft) @ 1600-5200	5.5 s	210 g/km
3.0t (Red Sport 400)	2016–2022	2,997 cc (183 cu in) V6 twin-turbo Nissan VR30DDTT	406 PS (299 kW; 400 hp) @ 6400	475 N⋅m (350 lb⋅ft) @ 1600-5200	4.5 s	210 g/km
3.0t AWD (Red Sport 400)	2016–2022	2,997 cc (183 cu in) V6 twin-turbo Nissan VR30DDTT	406 PS (299 kW; 400 hp) @ 6400	475 N⋅m (350 lb⋅ft) @ 1600-5200	4.7 s	210 g/km

=== Production ===
Production of the Infiniti Q60 coupé began in Nissan's manufacturing facility in Tochigi, Japan for export only. In 2019, Infiniti was testing some of its current models at the Spaceport America desert test tracks, such as its Q50 sports sedan and Q60 sports coupe.

=== Sales and marketing ===
Kit Harington was featured in an Infiniti Q60 short film titled Tyger. According to an interview conducted by I4U News, Allyson Witherspoon, the director of marketing communications and media at Infiniti USA, said "The Kit Harington film is just the first piece of an completely integrated marketing campaign for the all-new Q60 that includes key strategic partnerships including media partners and influencers." In February 2017, Infiniti delivered bouquets of flowers to the doors of other Infiniti owners in a Q60 in Europe.

Year	US sales	Canada sales
2016	3,970	422
2017	10,751	1,118
2018	9,071	848
2019	5,043	522
2020	2,792	258
2021	2,728	307
2022	1,847	180
2023	1,060	244
2024	52	28

=== Discontinuation ===
In August 2022, Infiniti confirmed the Q60 will end production at the end of 2022 as its final model year, as the "[brand is] focusing on the most popular luxury automotive segments such as crossovers and SUVs, as well as the upcoming EV we recently announced that will be built here in the U.S."
