= Hideyuki Fujino =

Japanese professional drifting driver (born 1974)

Hideyuki Fujino 藤野 秀之
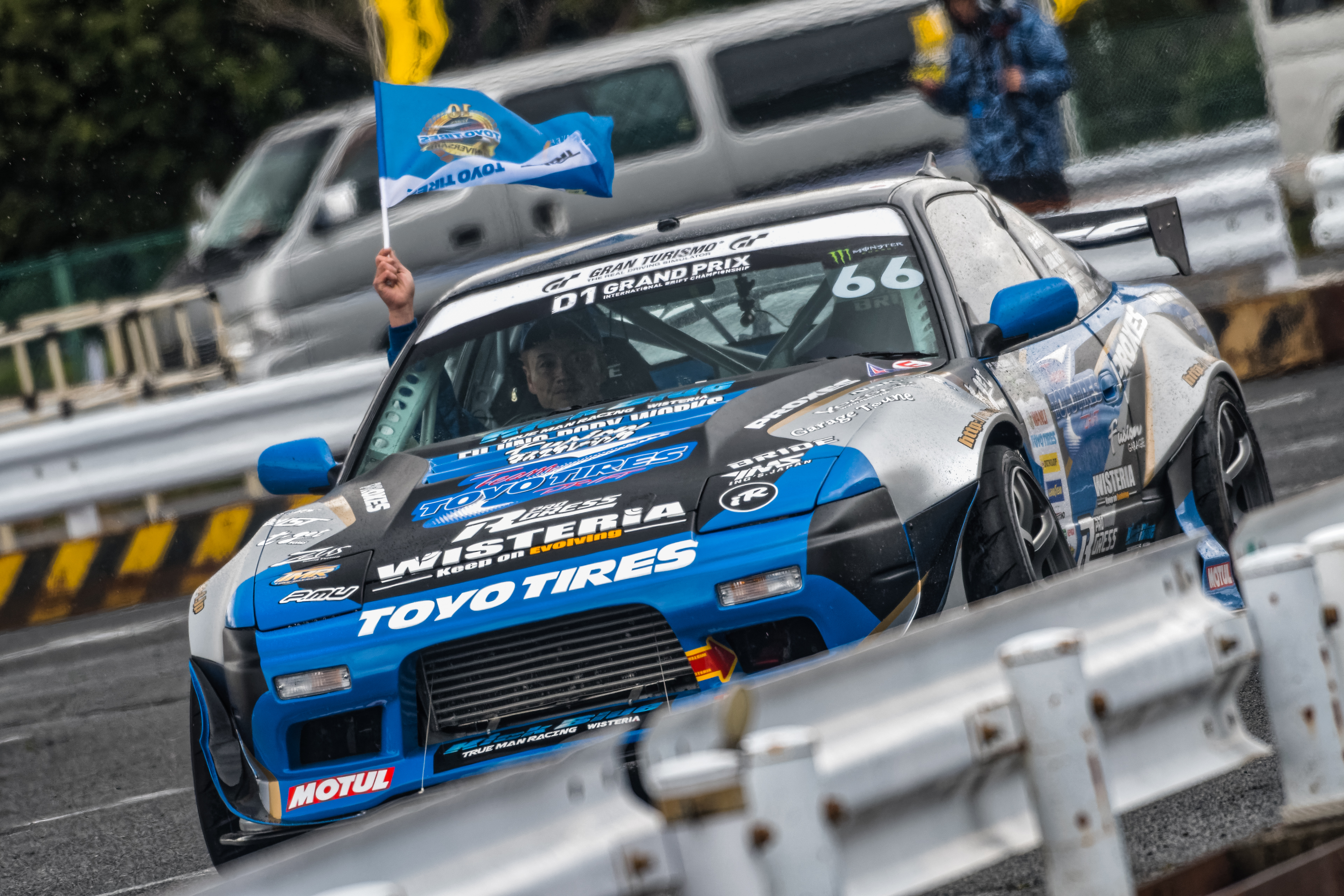
- Fujino driving in 2017
- Born: 26 June 1974 (age 52) Saitama, Japan

D1 Grand Prix career
- Debut season: 2001
- Current team: Team Toyo Tires Drift
- Car number: 66
- Former teams: WISTERIA
- Wins: 8
- Best finish: 1st in 2017, 2023

Previous series
- 2011-2016 2006-2013 2019: The Drift Muscle; D1 Street Legal; Formula Drift Japan

Championship titles
- 2014, 2015, 2016 2017, 2023, 2025: The Drift Muscle; D1 Grand Prix

Hideyuki Fujino (藤野 秀之, Fujino Hideyuki; born 26 June 1974, Saitama Prefecture) is a Japanese professional drifting driver. He currently competes in the D1 Grand Prix series for Team Toyo Tires Drift, and is the 2017, 2023 and 2025 series champion. He is the oldest winner and champion in D1GP.

Fujino ran his own shop, Wisteria based in Fukaya.

== Career ==
From early age, Fujino already around cars as his family in car business and own a car dealership in Fukaya and he naturally attracted to cars. He initially learn to drive a forklift before car. The first car he drive is an AE85 owned by his family where he use it to drive on riverbed before switching to S13 Silvia.

He is introduced to drifting by one of his senior who shows him drifting in Video Option featuring Keiichi Tsuchiya which inspired him to start drifting right after getting his driving license at the age of 18.

With the inception of D1 Grand Prix in 2001, he start to compete as a privateer making him one of the early generation of driver of the series. However due to his results not being good enough he stopped competing in the series after 2003.

After the D1 Street Legal was launched in 2006 he start to compete in it instead, where he regularly become seeded driver in the series. He also start get sponsor from Kazama Auto and later GP Sports and Nankang. He claim his one and only win in the series at opening round of the 2013 season.

Fujino also start compete in The Drift Muscle series and went on to dominate the series. Claiming the championship 3 years in a row from 2014 to 2016 driving his 180SX and later S13 Silvia. He is due to defend his title in 2017 however his car is not ready in time and he eventually focus on his D1GP campaign instead.

2015 marked Fujino's return to D1GP driving the same180SX used in Drift Muscle, he managed to finishes second on his return to the series after long time. he along with Masato Kawabata later launch their own body kit for 180SX named Kick Blue which is sell by both his shop Wisteria and Kawabata's newly open shop True Man Racing

Starting from 2016, Fujino would get support from Toyo Tires and compete in full-time basis. his best finish was second in round 6 at Ebisu and he end the season third in standings.

Fujino start the 2017 season by winning his first round at the opening round of the season he claimed his second win at round 4 and heading to the final round of the season he led the championship from Masashi Yokoi, Akira Hirajima, Masato Kawabata and Daigo Saito in a 5-way fight for the championship, he succeeded to keep his championship lead after winning his battle in best 8 and seal his first D1GP title and also the solo run champions.

In 2018, Fujino started the season with a win in the second round but he was unable to defend his title and finish the season sixth in standings. The following year he is promoted to Toyo Tires main team after Trust's withdrawal from the competition and is one of the championship contenders for D1GP but loses out on the final round.

In 2021, Fujino changed his car to Toyota 86 previously driven by Thai driver Daychapond Toyingcharoen and got second place on the first round with the car and lead the championship for the first time since 2018, despite strong start to his season he struggled for the rest of the season and ended up in eleventh in the standings.

At the 2022 Tokyo Auto Salon, Fujino announced that he would debut the newly released Toyota GR86 for that year D1GP he also built the same car for his teammate Kawabata. On the first round, he was able to win the solo run and claim third in battle while his teammate won the round, his best result is second on the penultimate round and he ended the season fifth in standings, an improvement from the previous season.

Fujino started his 2023 season with a win in D1GP Round Zero Exhibition Match at Fuji Speedway. he consistently scoring points in first half of the season before winning round 6 at Ebisu, his first win since 2018 season moving him up to first place in standings. However, after both Autopolis rounds, he dropped to fourth in standings but still within close reach of the title and heading to another five-way fight against Naoki Nakamura, Koudai Sobagiri, Seimi Tanaka and Koudai Sobagiri. Fujino closes the gap to the championship lead after winning penultimate round after beating title rival and championship leader Naoki Nakamura, he would seal the Solo Run championship after qualified first. Fujino managed to seal his second Overall title after winning the Top 16 battle while Nakamura unable to pass to top-16. His second title were won with similar results to his first title with two wins and Solo Run title and after a five-way fight to the title. However his 2024 season was disappointing as he only scores 97 points and seventh in the overall ranking and fail to enter final once this season.

For 2025, Fujino was now assisted by Gengo Kitazawa from DG-5 as his spotter who previously guided Yasuyuki Kazama and Youichi Imamura. He started the season with third place in round two and runner-up in round 4. He won the 5th round at Ebisu starting his charge for the overall championship. A series of high point scoring follows at Autopolis which put him second in overall championship coming to final two round at Odaiba. Fujino won the final round of the season and with 2 additional points from qualifying, he overhaul a 19 points deficit from Koudai Sobagiri to win his third D1GP title by just 1 point.

== Complete Drifting Results ==
Colour	Result
Gold	Winner
Silver	2nd place
Bronze	3rd place
Green	Last 4 [Semi-final]
Blue	Last 8 [Quarter-final]
Purple	Last 16 (16) [1st Tsuiou Round OR Tandem Battle] (Numbers are given to indicate Top 10 finish)
Black	Disqualified (DSQ) (Given to indicate that the driver has been stripped of their position through disqualification)
White	First Round (TAN) [Tansou OR Qualifying Single Runs]
Red	Did not qualify (DNQ)

- When driver's position are highlighted in blue, this indicates either the driver earned 100pt or 100pt tansou (solo run) bonus has been awarded, with the latter being in use for Pre-2005.

=== D1 Grand Prix ===
Year	Entrant	Car	1	2	3	4	5	6	7	8	Position	Points
2001		Nissan RPS13	EBS; N	NIK; TAN	BHH; N	EBS; DNQ	NIK; N	⇨			-	0
2002		Nissan RPS13	BHH; N	EBS; TAN	SGO; N	TKB; N	EBS; N	SEK; N	NIK; N	⇨	-	0
2003		Nissan RPS13	TKB; N	BHH; N	SGO; N	FUJ; N	EBS; DNQ	SEK; N	TKB; DNQ	⇨	-	0
2015	WISTERIA	Nissan RPS13	ODB; 2	SUZ; N	EBS; N	TKB; N	MSI; N	ODB; N	⇨		26	30
2016	WISTERIA with TOYO TIRES	Nissan RPS13	ODB; 3	FUJ; 10	TKB; 9	TKB; 11	EBS; 5	EBS; 2	ODB; 4	⇨	3	107
2017	WISTERIA TOYO TIRES	Nissan RPS13	ODB; 1	ODB; 3	TKB; 15	MSI; 5	EBS; 1	EBS; 3	ODB; 3	⇨	1	131
2018	Team TOYO TIRES DRIFT WISTERIA RACING	Nissan RPS13	MSI; 5	MSI; 1	APS; 5	TOK; 10	TKB; 4	EBS; 12	EBS; DSQ	ODB; 15	6	110

== Sources ==
- D1 Grand Prix
- Fujino's D1 Profile
