= Botnar =

Botnar is a surname. Notable people with the surname include:

- Octav Botnar (1913–1998), British businessman
- Vitali Botnar (born 2001), Russian footballer

== See also ==
- Fondation Botnar, philanthropic foundation
