= Freeside =

Freeside may refer to:

- Freeside, a resort in space in the novel Neuromancer by William Gibson
- Freeside, a location in the game Fallout New Vegas.

== See also ==
- Vision GLK Freeside, 2008 concept car of the Mercedes-Benz GLK-Class
