= Infiniti Q30 =

Subcompact executive car produced by Infiniti (2015–2019)

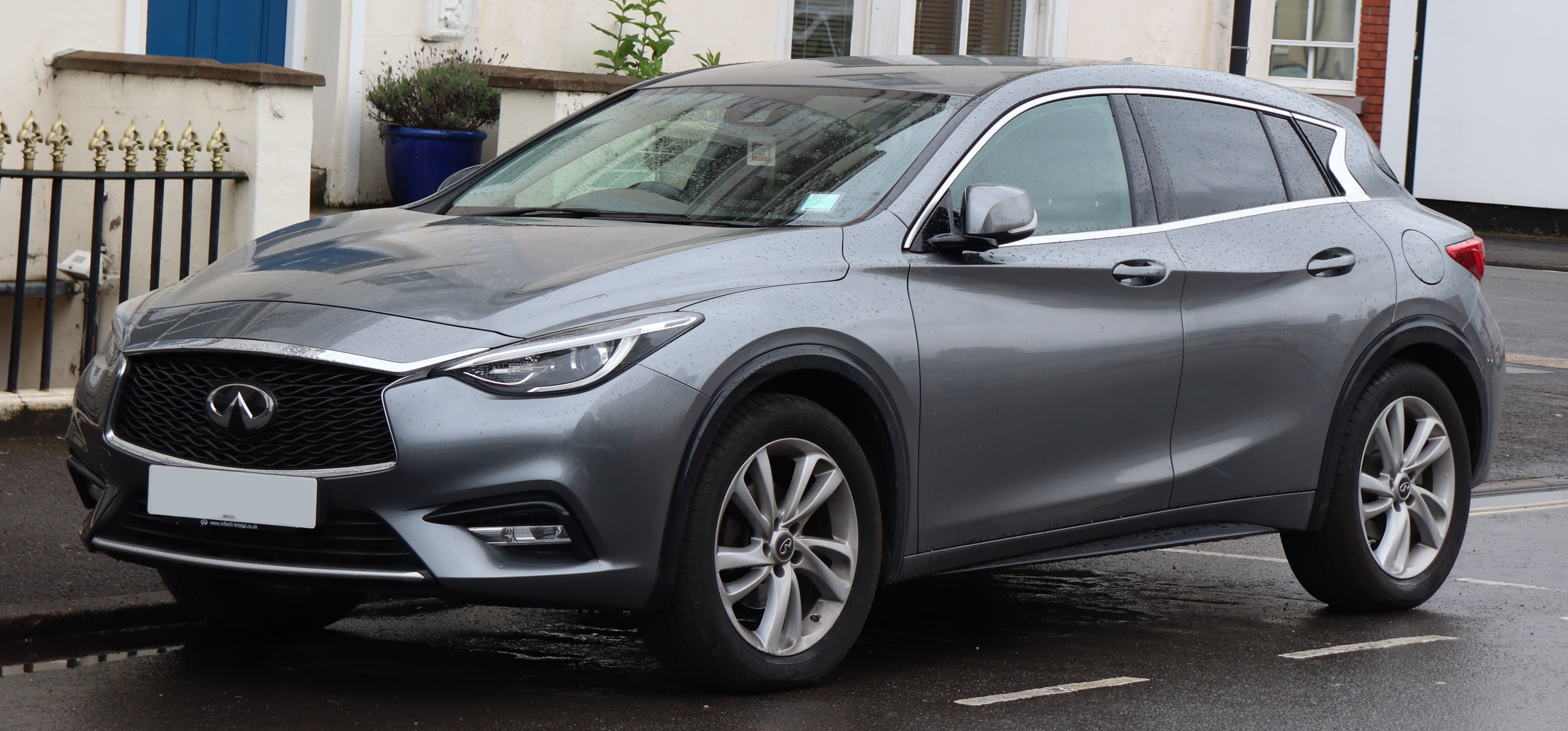
- 2017 Infiniti Q30 SE Diesel (UK)

Overview
- Manufacturer: Nissan
- Model code: H15
- Also called: Infiniti QX30 (crossover version)
- Production: December 2015 – 2019
- Model years: 2016–2019
- Assembly: United Kingdom: Sunderland (NMUK)

Body and chassis
- Class: Subcompact executive car (C)
- Body style: 5-door hatchback
- Layout: Front-engine, front-wheel-drive; Front-engine, all-wheel-drive
- Platform: Mercedes-Benz MFA
- Related: Infiniti QX30; Mercedes-Benz A-Class (W176); Mercedes-Benz GLA-Class (X156)

Powertrain
- Engine: 1.6 L Mercedes-Benz M270 I4-T (petrol); 2.0 L Mercedes-Benz M270 I4-T (petrol); 1.5 L Renault K-Type engine K9K I4-T (diesel); 2.2 L Mercedes-Benz OM651 I4-T (diesel)
- Transmission: 6-speed manual; 7-speed automatic

Dimensions
- Wheelbase: 2,700 mm (106.3 in)
- Length: 4,425 mm (174.2 in)
- Width: 1,805 mm (71.1 in)
- Height: 1,495 mm (58.9 in)

The Infiniti Q30 is a subcompact executive car built and sold by Nissan's Infiniti luxury brand between 2016 and 2019. The Q30 is built on the third-generation Mercedes-Benz A-Class platform to create a small, premium hatchback. The Q30 is a result of the Nissan, Renault and Mercedes partnership agreement to share technology. It ceased production in the UK in mid-2019 as the brand withdrew from Europe altogether at the same time. A modified version was also marketed under the name QX30, which offers higher ground clearance and crossover design attributes in order to be marketed as a crossover.

== Q30 Concept (2013) ==
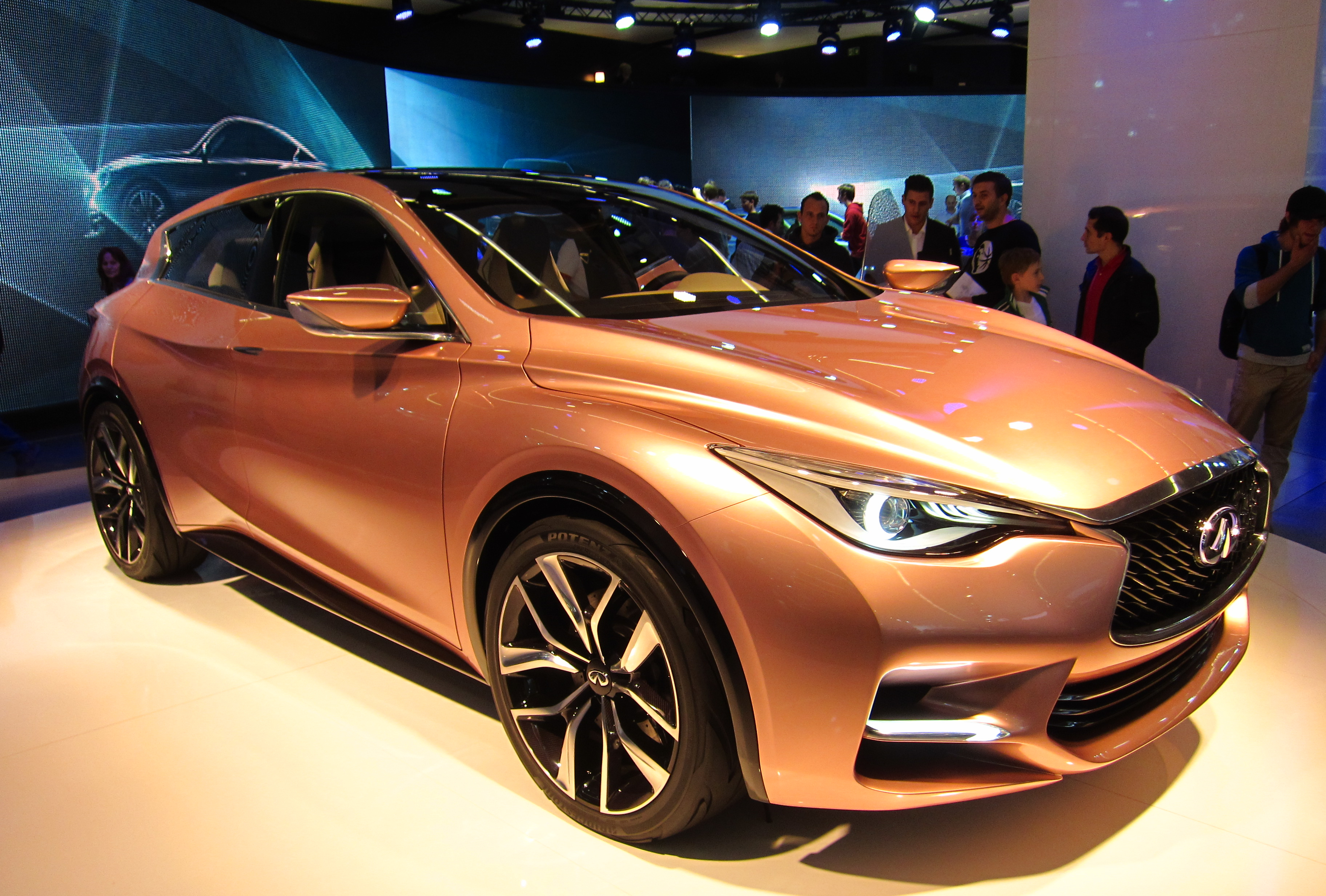
Q30 Concept at the 2013 Frankfurt Motor Show

The concept car was unveiled in September 2013, at the Frankfurt Motor Show.

== Production model (2015) ==
The production version of Q30 is based on the Q30 Concept, built on the third-generation A-Class's platform.

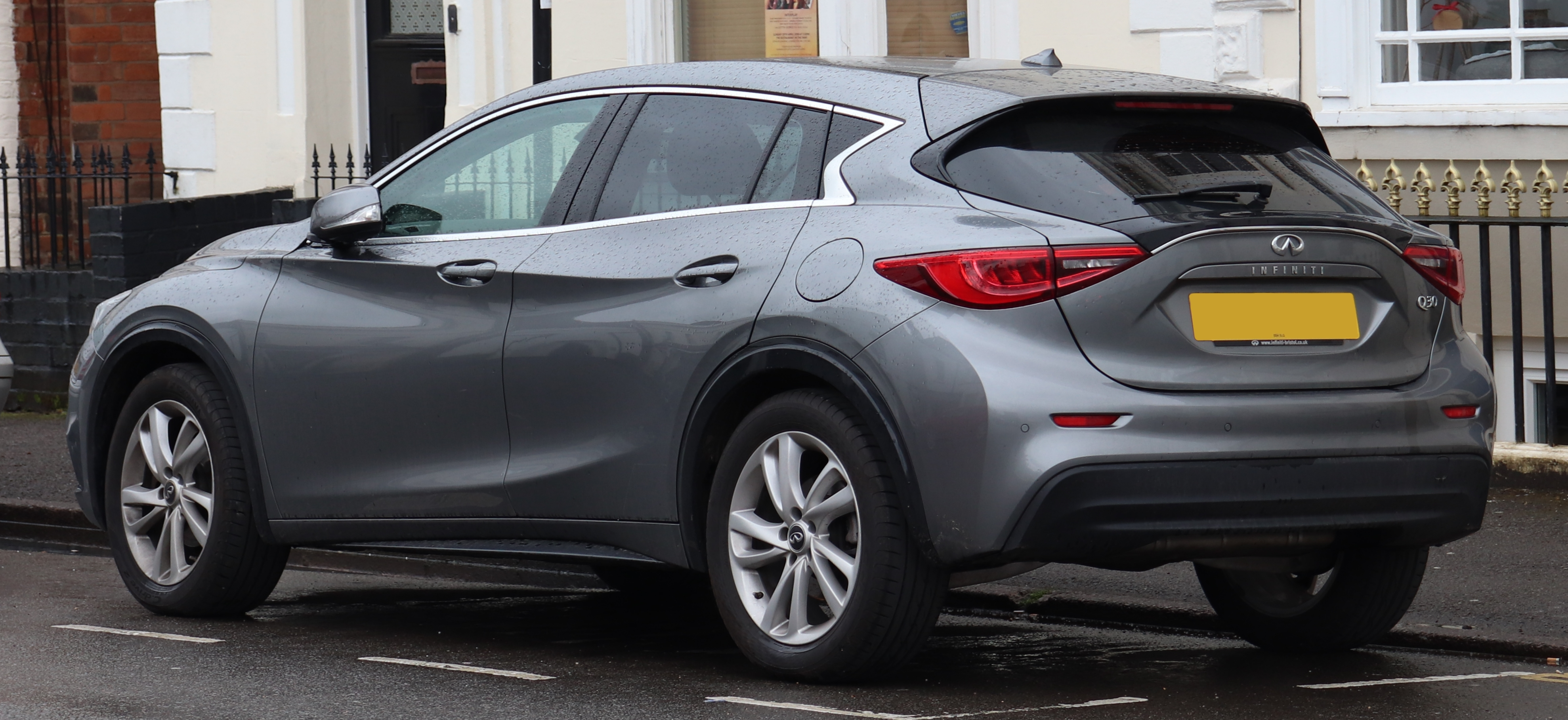
Rear view

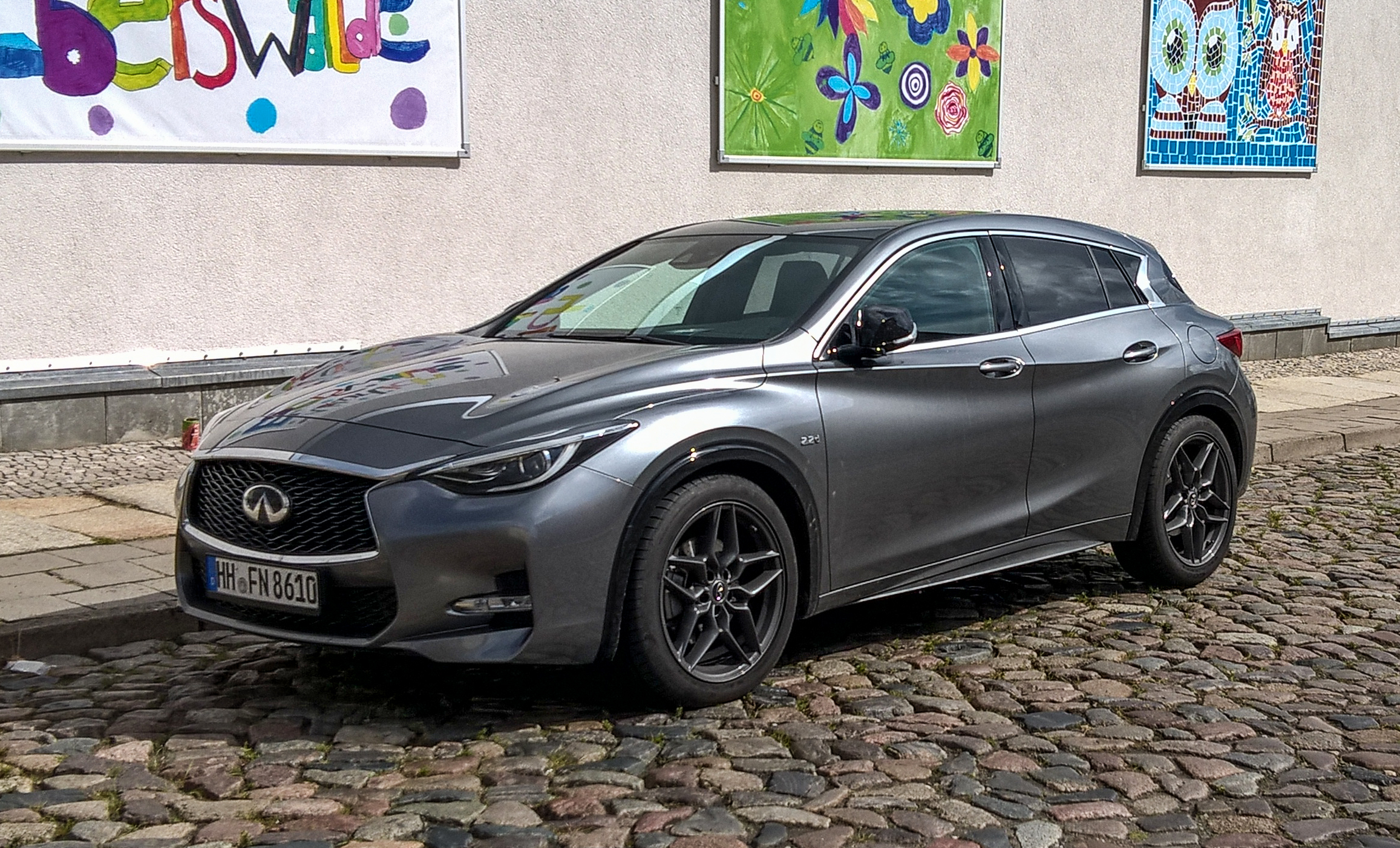

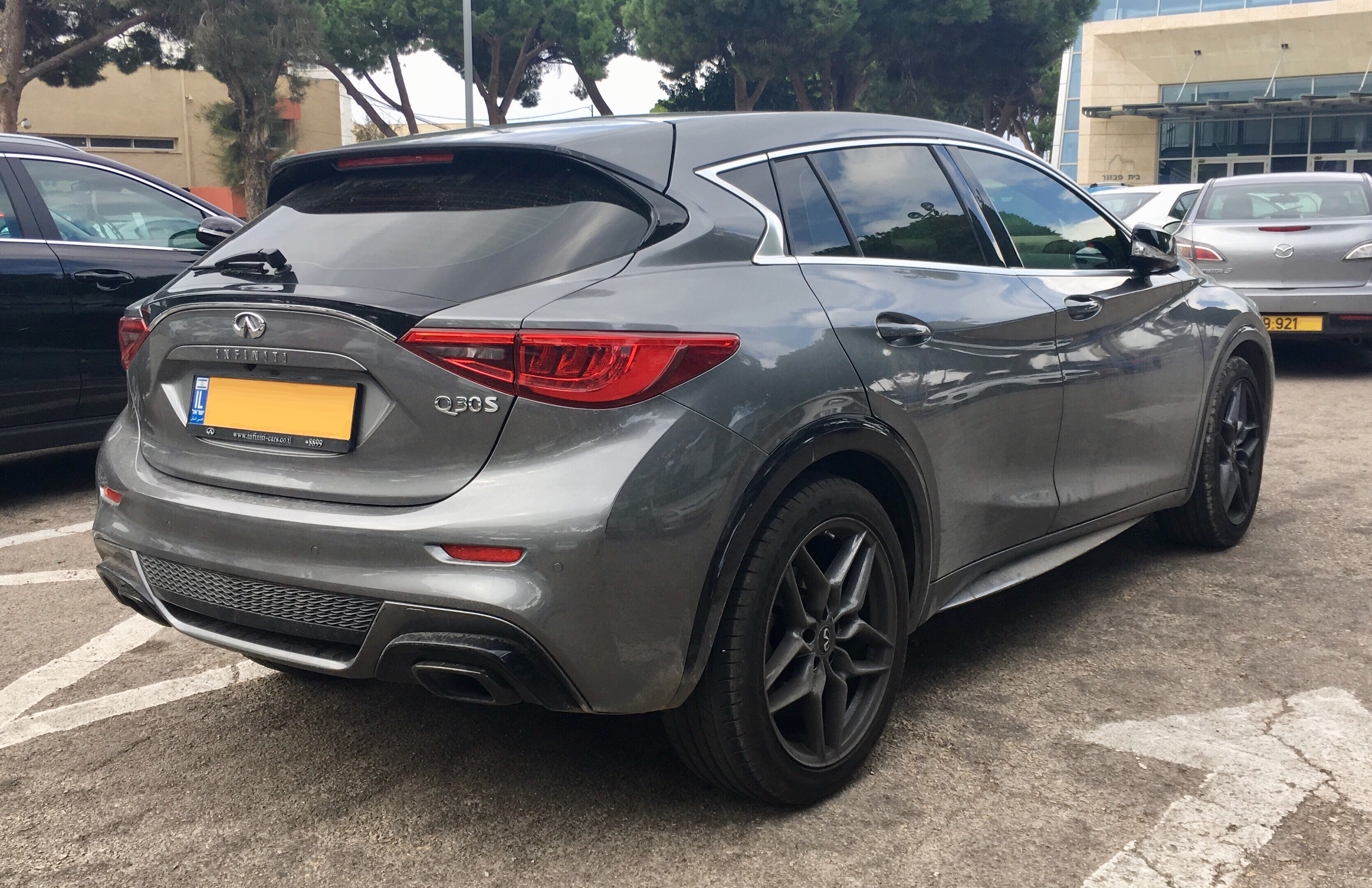
Infiniti Q30 Sport

The vehicle was unveiled at the 2015 Frankfurt Motor Show.

The vehicles went on sale in 2015.

=== Engines ===
The Q30 is offered with a choice of petrol and diesel engines shared with the third-generation A-Class.

Petrol engines
Model	Years	Type/code	Power, Torque@rpm	0–100 km/h (0–62 mph) acceleration	Top speed
1.6t (122PS)	2015–2019	1,595 cc (97 cu in) I4 turbo (Mercedes-Benz M 270 DE 16 AL red.)	122 PS (90 kW; 120 hp)@5000, 200 N⋅m (148 lb⋅ft)@1250-4000	9.4 s	200 km/h (124 mph)
1.6t (156PS)	2015–2019	1,595 cc (97 cu in) I4 turbo (Mercedes-Benz M 270 DE 16 AL)	156 PS (115 kW; 154 hp)@5300, 250 N⋅m (184 lb⋅ft)@1250-4000	8.9 s	215 km/h (134 mph)
2.0t	2015–2019	1,991 cc (121 cu in) I4 turbo (Mercedes-Benz M 270 DE 20 AL)	211 PS (155 kW; 208 hp)@5500, 350 N⋅m (258 lb⋅ft)@1200-4000	7.2 s	235 km/h (146 mph)
2.0t AWD	2015–2019	1,991 cc (121 cu in) I4 turbo (Mercedes-Benz M 270 DE 20 AL)	211 PS (155 kW; 208 hp)@5500, 350 N⋅m (258 lb⋅ft)@1200-4000	7.3 s	230 km/h (143 mph)

Diesel engines
Model	Years	Type/code	Power, Torque@rpm	0–100 km/h (0–62 mph) acceleration	Top speed
1.5d	2015–2019	1,461 cc (89 cu in) I4 turbo (Renault K9K)	109 PS (80 kW; 108 hp)@4000, 260 N⋅m (192 lb⋅ft)@1750-2500	12/11.9 s	190 km/h (118 mph)
2.2d	2015–2019	2,143 cc (131 cu in) I4 turbo (Mercedes-Benz OM 651 DE 22 LA)	170 PS (125 kW; 168 hp)@3400-4000, 350 N⋅m (258 lb⋅ft)@1400-3400	8.3 s	220 km/h (137 mph)
2.2d AWD	2015–2019	2,143 cc (131 cu in) I4 turbo (Mercedes-Benz OM 651 DE 22 LA)	170 PS (125 kW; 168 hp)@3400-4000, 350 N⋅m (258 lb⋅ft)@1400-3400	8.5 s	215 km/h (134 mph)

=== Transmissions ===
Petrol engines
Model	Years	Types
1.6t (122PS)	2015–2019	6-speed manual
1.6t (156PS)	2015–2019	7-speed automatic
2.0t	2015–2019	7-speed automatic
2.0t AWD	2015–2019	7-speed automatic

Diesel engines
Model	Years	Types
1.5d	2015–2019	6-speed manual, 7-speed automatic
2.2d	2015–2019	7-speed automatic
2.2d AWD	2015–2019	7-speed automatic

=== Exterior ===
The Q30 Sport has a lower ride height (1475mm), 19 inch alloy wheels and different front and rear bumpers.

=== Interior ===
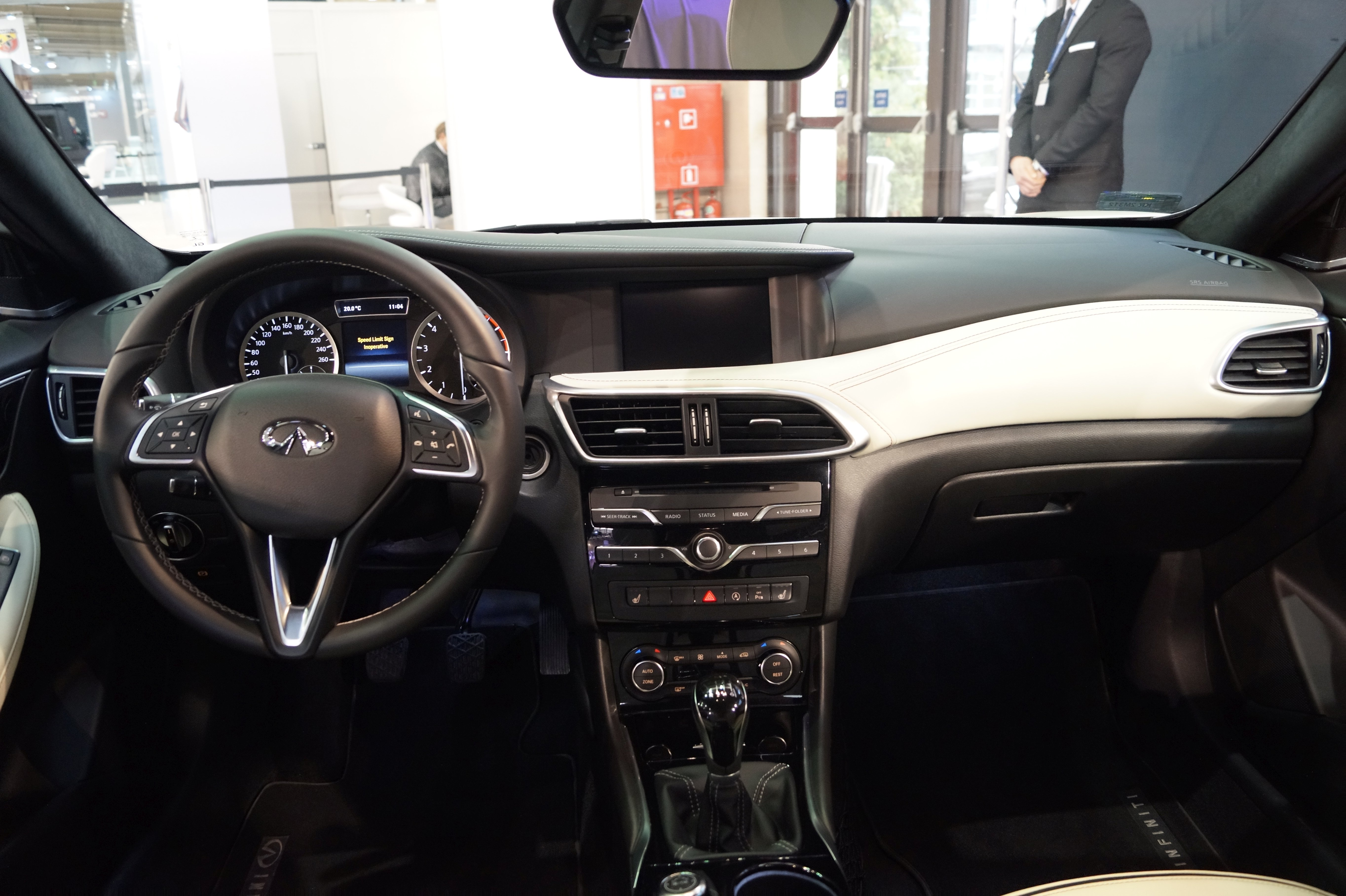
Interior

The Q30 shares much of its switch gear with the third-generation A-Class on which its based, however the cabin design differs in layout and materials. Additionally, the Q30 uses Infiniti's own infotainment system, Infiniti InTouch.

Upholstery choices include ‘City Black’ with purple stitching; ‘Cafe Teak’ brown and black upholstery with black stitching; ‘Gallery White’ white leather with red accents or Alcantara. 'Dinamica', an Italian suede like material, has been applied to the roof line and pillars.

=== Production ===
The expansion of Nissan Motor Manufacturing UK to prepare for Q30 production was originally announced on 14 October 2013.

Production of the Q30 began at the Nissan Motor Manufacturing assembly plant in Sunderland, England in December 2015, which supplies vehicles to Europe, the United States and China.

Deliveries of the Q30 began on 20 January 2016. Production ceased in 2019 as Infiniti withdrew from the UK and European markets.

=== Marketing ===
As part of Q30 launch in the United Kingdom, a Q30 with 48,000 copper tacks adhered to half of the vehicle's bodywork was unveiled in 2016 London Art Fair at the Islington Business Centre. The sculpture was produced by British contemporary artist Rachel Ducker.

== Safety ==
ANCAP test results Infiniti Q30 (2015, aligned with Euro NCAP)
Test	Points	%
Overall:	5 /5 stars	
Adult occupant:	32.1	84%
Child occupant:	42.2	86%
Pedestrian:	32.9	91%
Safety assist:	9.6	74%
