= Infiniti QX30 =

Subcompact luxury crossover SUV produced by Infiniti (2016–2019)

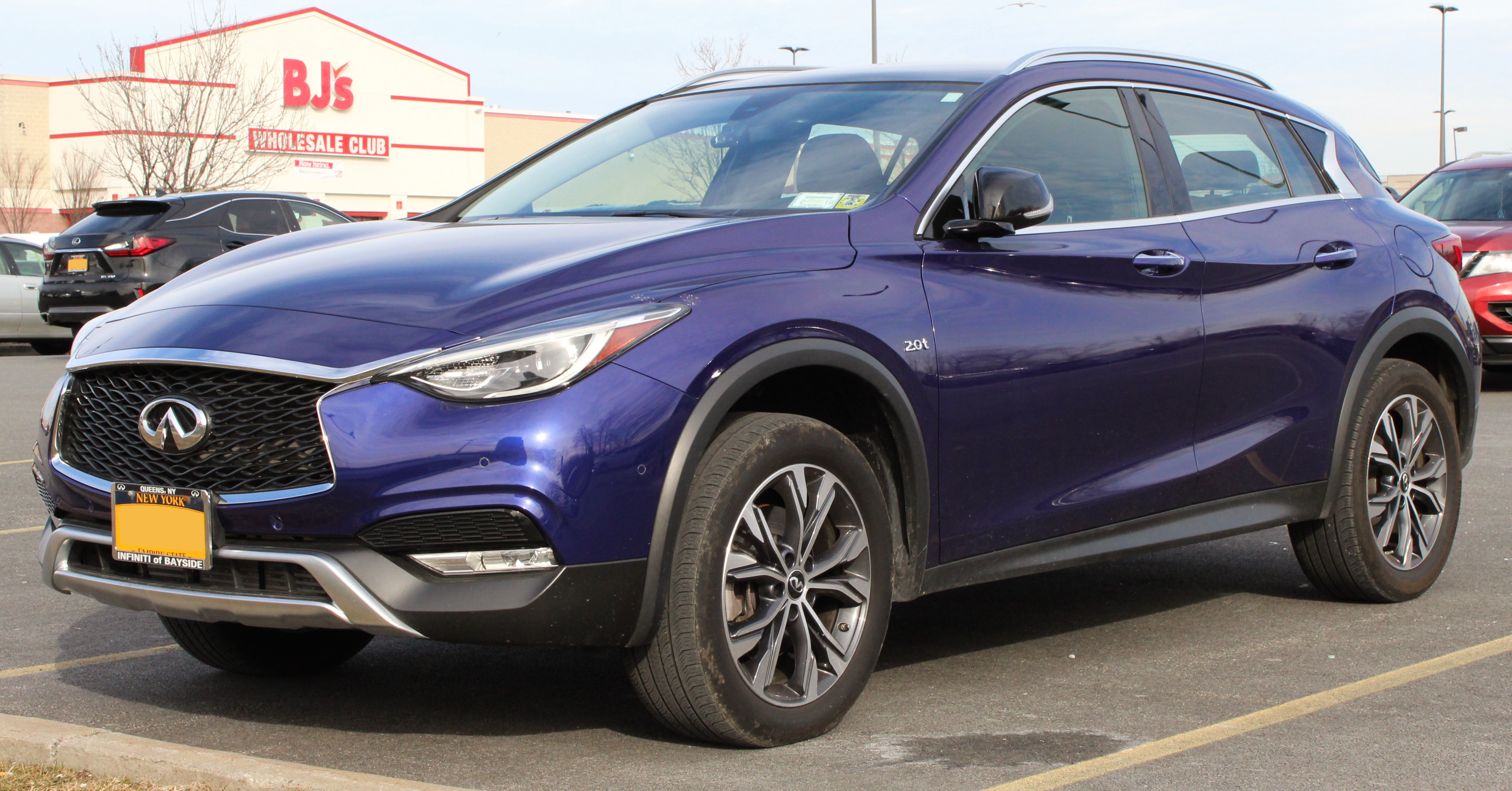
- Infiniti QX30 2.0t AWD (US)

Overview
- Manufacturer: Nissan
- Model code: H15
- Production: 2016–2019
- Model years: 2017–2019
- Assembly: United Kingdom: Sunderland (NMUK)
- Designer: Hirohisa Ono (2010)

Body and chassis
- Class: Subcompact luxury crossover SUV
- Body style: 5-door SUV
- Layout: Front-engine, front-wheel-drive; Front-engine, all-wheel-drive
- Platform: Modular Front Architecture
- Related: Infiniti Q30; Mercedes-Benz A-Class (W176); Mercedes-Benz GLA (X156)

Powertrain
- Engine: Petrol: 1.6 L Mercedes-Benz M270 I4-T; 2.0 L Mercedes-Benz M270 I4-T; Diesel: 2.2 L Mercedes-Benz OM651 I4-T
- Transmission: 7-speed automatic

Dimensions
- Wheelbase: 2,700 mm (106.3 in)
- Length: 4,425 mm (174.2 in)
- Width: 1,815 mm (71.5 in)
- Height: 1,470–1,530 mm (57.9–60.2 in)
- Kerb weight: 1,490–1,530 kg (3,285–3,373 lb)

The Infiniti QX30 is a subcompact luxury crossover SUV manufactured and marketed by Nissan's Infiniti luxury brand. It is heavily based on the Q30 hatchback with modifications mainly in its ride height in order for it to be marketed as a crossover. Both the Q30 and the QX30 are based on the first-generation Mercedes-Benz GLA and the third-generation Mercedes-Benz A-Class. The QX30 was manufactured from 2016 to mid-2019, at the same time the brand withdrew from Europe altogether.

== Concept model ==
The QX30 Concept featured 21-inch wheels, large tires, and increased blackout around the wheel opening, with a satin chrome front bumper. It was introduced at the 2015 Geneva International Motor Show, followed by the 2015 New York International Auto Show.

== Production model ==
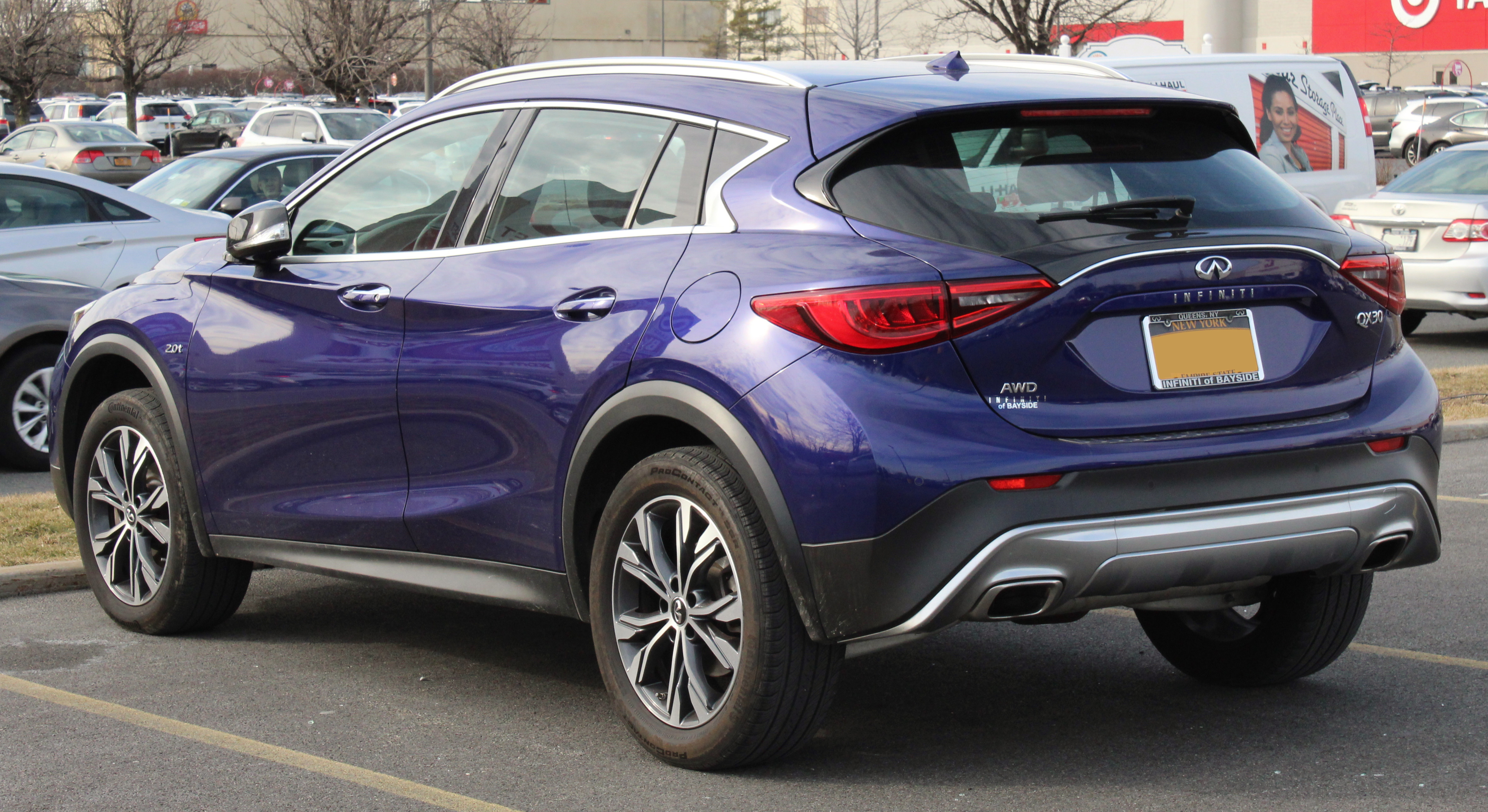
Rear view

Based on the Infiniti Q30, the QX30 includes redesigned front and rear bumpers, grained side sills, as well as bodywork finished with satin chrome plated inserts with metallic finish along with an increased ride height. The QX30 was unveiled at the 2015 Los Angeles Motor Show and the 2015 Auto Guangzhou, followed by the 2016 Geneva Motor Show.

US and Canada models went on sale in the middle of 2016 for the 2017 model year, with a 2.0 liter turbocharged four cylinder engine with 7-speed dual-clutch automatic transmission, followed by Mexico and Latin America in the second half of 2016.

European models went on sale in the middle of 2016. Early models included 2.2d AWD with 7-speed dual-clutch transmission.

=== Engines ===
Specs
Model	Years	Type/code	Power	Torque
Petrol
2.0t 2.0t AWD	2016–2019	1,991 cc (121 cu in) turbo I4 (Mercedes-Benz M 270 DE 20 AL)	211 PS (155 kW; 208 hp) at 5,500 rpm	350 N⋅m (258 lb⋅ft) at 1,200–4,000 rpm
Diesel
2.2d AWD	2016–2019	2,143 cc (131 cu in) turbo I4 (Mercedes-Benz OM 651 DE 22 LA)	170 PS (125 kW; 168 hp) at 3,400–4,000 rpm	350 N⋅m (258 lb⋅ft) at 1,400–3,400 rpm

=== Production ===
The QX30 was assembled in Sunderland, United Kingdom, with the engines assembled in Germany.

=== Marketing ===
As part of QX30 launch in the United Kingdom, a QX30 with 48,000 copper tacks adhered to half of the QX30's bodywork was unveiled in the 2016 London Art Fair at the Islington Business Center.
