= Fondation Botnar =

Swiss philanthropic foundation

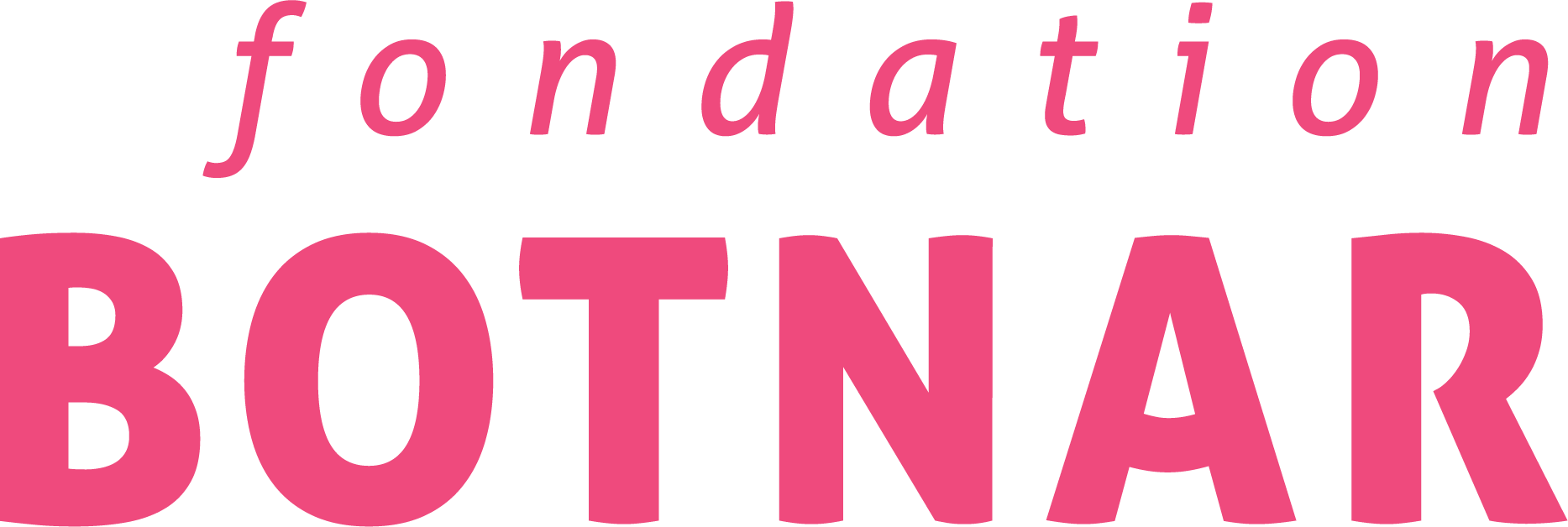
- Formation: 2003
- Founder: Marcela Botnar
- Location: Basel, Switzerland
- Website: www.fondationbotnar.org

Fondation Botnar is a philanthropic foundation based in Basel, Switzerland, holding CHF 4 billion in assets. The foundation was founded in 2003 by Marcela Botnar, wife of businessman and philanthropist Octav Botnar.

It is dedicated to the wellbeing of young people in urban and digital spaces around the world. The foundation works with partners across multiple sectors and provides funding and support for research and projects that fit within its strategic focus

== History ==
Fondation Botnar was founded in 2003 by Marcela Botnar to continue the philanthropic work of her and her late husband, Octav Botnar, motivated in part by the memory of their late daughter, Camelia.

== Strategic focus ==
The foundation concentrates on four interrelated areas: enabling liveable and sustainable city systems, enabling a human rights-based digital transformation, promoting mental health, and strengthening quality public education.

The foundation also invests in biomedical research for children and young people’s health. In 2024, it committed CHF 900 million over 15 years to form the Botnar Institute of Immune Engineering, an independent research institute in Basel, Switzerland. In 2020, it also committed CHF 100 million to finance the founding of the Basel Research Centre for Child Health. The original funding was followed by additional commitments, for a total of CHF 165 million to date.

== Projects ==
Fondation Botnar supports a range of projects and initiatives within its strategic area of focus.

=== OurCity ===
OurCity is one of Fondation Botnar’s key initiatives, helping cities design and implement youth-centred strategies together with young people. Working in collaboration with youth networks, civil society, local authorities, and other innovators, OurCity now operates in five cities: Tanga (Tanzania), Cluj-Napoca (Romania), Barranquilla (Colombia), Koforidua (Ghana), and Manta (Ecuador).

=== Healthy Cities for Adolescents ===
Healthy Cities for Adolescents is a multi-year initiative by Fondation Botnar that supports adolescent health and wellbeing in intermediary cities across the Global South. Active in six countries and 17 cities, the programme funds projects that engage young people in addressing issues such as mental health, education, public spaces, and climate change. Delivered through local partnerships, Healthy Cities for Adolescents promotes adolescent perspectives in urban planning and policy.

=== The Being Initiative ===
The foundation funds the Being Initiative, a global collaboration working to make youth mental health a global priority. Being works with young people (aged 10 to 24) in 12 low- and middle-income countries to improve their mental wellbeing through research, innovation, and partnerships.

=== RIGHTS Click ===
RIGHTS Click, a global programme developed by the foundation with Amnesty International aims to improve the digital rights of children and young people. By combining research, human rights education, and youth-led advocacy, the initiative supports young activists to advocate for safer online spaces.

=== D-Tree International ===
Since 2018, Fondation Botnar has supported D-tree International, committing over CHF 8 million to support Jamii ni Afya, Zanzibar’s national digital community health program. The initiative equips community health volunteers with mobile decision-support tools to improve maternal, newborn and child health, along with other community services. Jamii ni Afya reached national scale in 2021 and is now government-led, with a transition plan in place for full government ownership.

Fondation Botnar also supports Afya-Tek, a digital primary health care program in mainland Tanzania that links community health workers, health facilities, and private drug dispensers to strengthen continuity of care and decision-making. D-tree is a partner in Afya-Tek.

== Partnerships ==
Fondation Botnar has memberships in the following partnerships/organisations.

- Member, SwissFoundations
- Member, Philea (formerly European Foundation Centre)
- Member, Swiss Sustainable Finance
- Member, Partnership for Maternal, Newborn & Child Health
- Member, International Alliance of Mental Health Research Funders (IAMHRF)
- Member, Impact Europe (formerly EVPA)
- Member, Latimpacto
- Partner, Child Health Initiative
- Board Member, StiftungStadt Basel
- Consultative Status, ECOSOC
- Non-State Actor in Official Relations, WHO
- Endorser, Digital Donor Principles
- Endorser, Principles for Digital Development
