= Mercedes-Benz GLK-Class =

Compact luxury crossover SUV

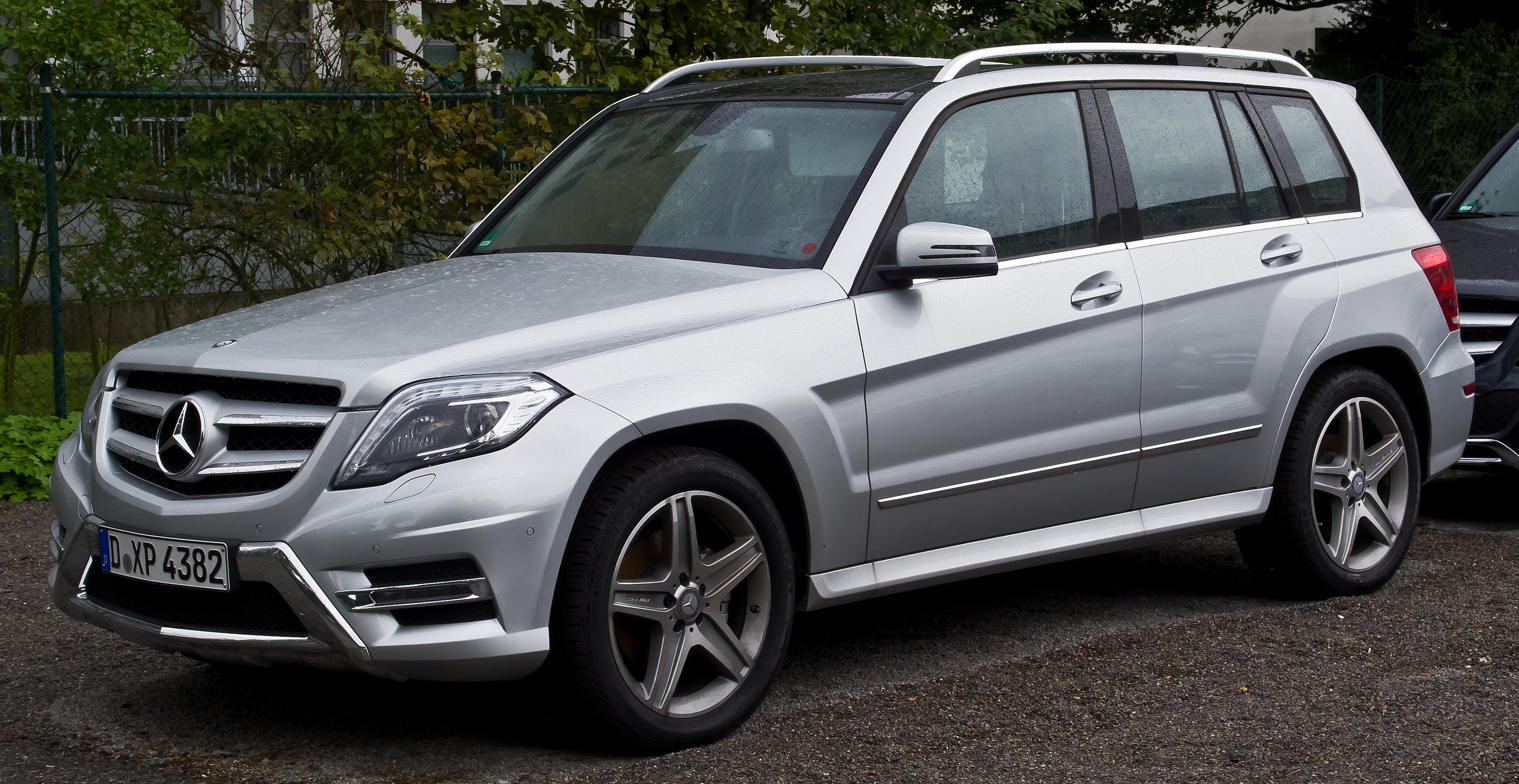

Overview
- Manufacturer: Daimler AG
- Model code: X204
- Production: 2008–2015
- Assembly: Germany: Bremen; China: Beijing (Beijing Benz); Egypt: 6th of October City (EGA); Vietnam: Ho Chi Minh City (MBV)

Body and chassis
- Class: Compact luxury crossover SUV
- Body style: 5-door SUV
- Layout: Front-engine, rear-wheel-drive; Front-engine, four-wheel-drive (4Matic)
- Related: Mercedes-Benz C-Class (W204); Mercedes-Benz E-Class (W212)

Powertrain
- Engine: 3.0L V6; 3.5L V6; 2.1L CDI I4; 3.0L CDI V6
- Transmission: 7-speed automatic 6-speed manual

Dimensions
- Wheelbase: 108.5 in (2,756 mm)
- Length: 178.2–178.3 in (4,526–4,529 mm)
- Width: 72.4–74.3 in (1,839–1,887 mm)
- Height: 66.9 in (1,699 mm)
- Curb weight: 4,079 lb (1,850 kg)

Chronology
- Successor: Mercedes-Benz GLC

The Mercedes-Benz GLK-Class (model code X204) is a compact luxury crossover SUV produced from 2008 to 2015, debuting at the 2008 Beijing Auto Show. The name GLK is an acronym for Geländewagen Luxus Kompaktklasse, taking its name from the larger Mercedes-Benz GL-Class, which in turn was named after the G-Wagen or Geländewagen. Thus, the GL is the luxury-oriented version of the G, and GLK is the compact version of the GL.

In 2015, the GLK-Class was replaced by the GLC as per the revised nomenclature adopted by the brand. Under this scheme, SUVs use the base name "GL", followed by the model's placement in Mercedes-Benz hierarchy. The "G" is for Geländewagen (German for off-road vehicle) and alludes the long-running G-Wagen. This is followed by the letter "L" that acts as a linkage with the letter "C"—the GLC being the SUV equivalent to the C-Class.

== Concept models ==
Two concept vehicles appeared in 2008: The Vision GLK Freeside and the Vision GLK Townside. The former was designed to handle light off-road duty, while the latter was intended for exclusively on-road driving.

The Freeside incorporated design aspects of the original Mercedes-Benz G-Class with typical design features from the contemporary Mercedes-Benz passenger car range. The concept included a 2.2-litre BlueTec four-cylinder Diesel engine rated at 170 PS (125 kW; 168 hp), 7G-Tronic seven-speed automatic transmission, 4Matic all-wheel drive, anticipatory Pre-Safe safety concept and the Intelligent Light System (ILS), Command APS infotainment centre, a rear-seat entertainment system with two screens and Thermotronic 3-zone automatic climate control, Agility Control suspension. The vehicle was unveiled in 2008 Detroit Auto Show.

== Production model ==
The vehicle's design was heavily influenced by the Mercedes-Benz C-Class.

The GLK-Class shares the C-Class W204 platform, and production plans continued after the demise of the similar Smart Formore. The vehicle was unveiled in Auto China 2008.

European models went on sale on June 30, 2008, with deliveries beginning in the autumn the same year. Early German models included GLK 220 CDI 4Matic BlueEfficiency, GLK 320 CDI 4Matic, GLK 280 4Matic, GLK 350 4Matic. GLK Edition 1 models are based on V6 engine models, but include exterior sports package, 20-inch wheels, Easy-Pack tailgate and specially coloured privacy glass in the rear compartment, interior sports package, black/white nappa leather seats from the designo range, AMG multifunction leather steering wheel, a black roof lining, exclusive aluminium trim elements and the Command APS system, calcite white body colour.

GLK 220 CDI BlueEfficiency, GLK 220 CDI 4Matic BlueEfficiency, GLK 300 4Matic, GLK 250 CDI 4Matic BlueEfficiency were introduced in 2009.

At launch in Germany and North America, the car was offered in all-wheel drive only, though a rear-wheel drive only version was added to the range.

The GLK-Class was not sold in RHD markets, such as the United Kingdom and Australia, due to a driveshaft used to operate the front wheels on 4WD versions of the GLK. It is positioned such that it occupies the same space as the steering column for RHD models, and as such the two configurations are not compatible with each other.

=== Vision GLK Bluetec Hybrid (2008) ===
A concept vehicle demonstrating a Bluetec engine with hybrid module was developed. It includes a four-cylinder Bluetec Diesel engine, maximum 160 N⋅m (118 lb⋅ft) electric motor, Alubeam Blue body colour, 20-inch light-alloy wheels, black leather upper dashboard upholstery, Command APS central display, Agility Control suspension.

The vehicle was unveiled at the 2008 Geneva Motor Show.

=== 2008 SEMA concepts (2008) ===
Mercedes-Benz USA partnered with four tuners to develop custom designs based on the upcoming 2010 GLK-Class vehicles, as part of the US launch of GLK-Class SUV in 2009.

The Urban Whip is a white roadster built by Boulevard Customs, NBS Performance. Based on the GLK 350 4Matic, it included custom-made wide-body kit developed with RoBrady Design, body lowered by 64mm with custom lowering springs, 26-inch Asanti AF 150 chrome wheels with custom black accents and 295/25 ZR26 Pirelli Scorpion tires, front and rear Brembo performance brake kit with 381mm 2-piece floating rotors and 8-pot front callipers and 344mm 2-piece floating rotors with 4-piston rear callipers, 5.7 kW custom stereo system with eight HD amps and six new JL Audio 13TW5 flat subwoofers.

Brabus Widestar included a 320 Bluetec engine from other models available in the United States, Widestar bodyshell, customised front and rear bumpers, LED daytime running lights, side skirts, a roof spoiler with LED lights (position lights) and all-new LED lighting units above the front windshield, 21-inch wheels with 295/30 ZR 21 tires, lower ride height by 30 mm via Brabus chassis kit, high-performance brake system, enhanced engine power to 258 PS (190 kW; 254 hp) and 610 N⋅m (450 lb⋅ft) via ECOPowerXtra tuning kit, semi-aniline leather upholstery, diagonal stitching on the seating, door panels and the entire vehicle floor in cognac colour; black leather on upper surfaces of dashboard and door panels; black with piano black wood trim at roof lining Alcantara upholstery, sports steering wheel and aluminium sports pedals, multimedia system mounted in the front seat backs with a DVD player and 7-inch monitors.

RennTech Rally Racer is a hybrid vehicle based on GLK 350 4Matic, built by Renntech, inspired by the winged, unlimited-class rally cars of Pikes Peak Hill Climb. The engine power was increased to 350 PS (257 kW; 345 hp) via special intake manifold, cams and cylinder heads, long-tube headers, composite air intake, Renntech ECU software. It also included hybrid system with 72 volt electric motor, 12 volt plug-in batteries. Other features include custom coil-over suspension from KW, Renntech brake combo with 412mm 2-piece rotors with 8-piston front callipers at the front and 356mm discs with 4-pot rear callipers, 20 inch 3-piece, 5-spoke Renntech Sniper Gray wheels with NT05 275/40 20 Nitto front and NT05 315/35 20 rear tires, aerodynamically-tuned body kit.

The Four Corners Rock Crawler is based on GLK 350 4Matic, built by Legendary Motorcar Company. The design was inspired by the idea of turning the GLK into an interactive snowboarding car. It included a gasoline-powered tow winch, stainless steel bar roof with swing-out side-mounted grinding rails, Perspex panel fitted to the roof, increased ride height by 38mm via custom-made spacers on the lower control arm at the rear and billet aluminium spacers at the front, 18-inch Jesse James Black-Widow rims with Toyo Open Country AT mudder tires, stock interior. The vehicles were unveiled in the 2008 SEMA Show, followed by 2008 Los Angeles Auto Show.

The ECO PowerXtra engine tuning kit found in Brabus Widestar concept also appeared in its GLK 320 CDI 4Matic upgrade kit. Brabus Widestar was later sold as conversion kit for X204 GLK built before June 2012. The construction of Rock Crawler concept was featured in season 9 of Dream Car Garage.

=== Safety ===
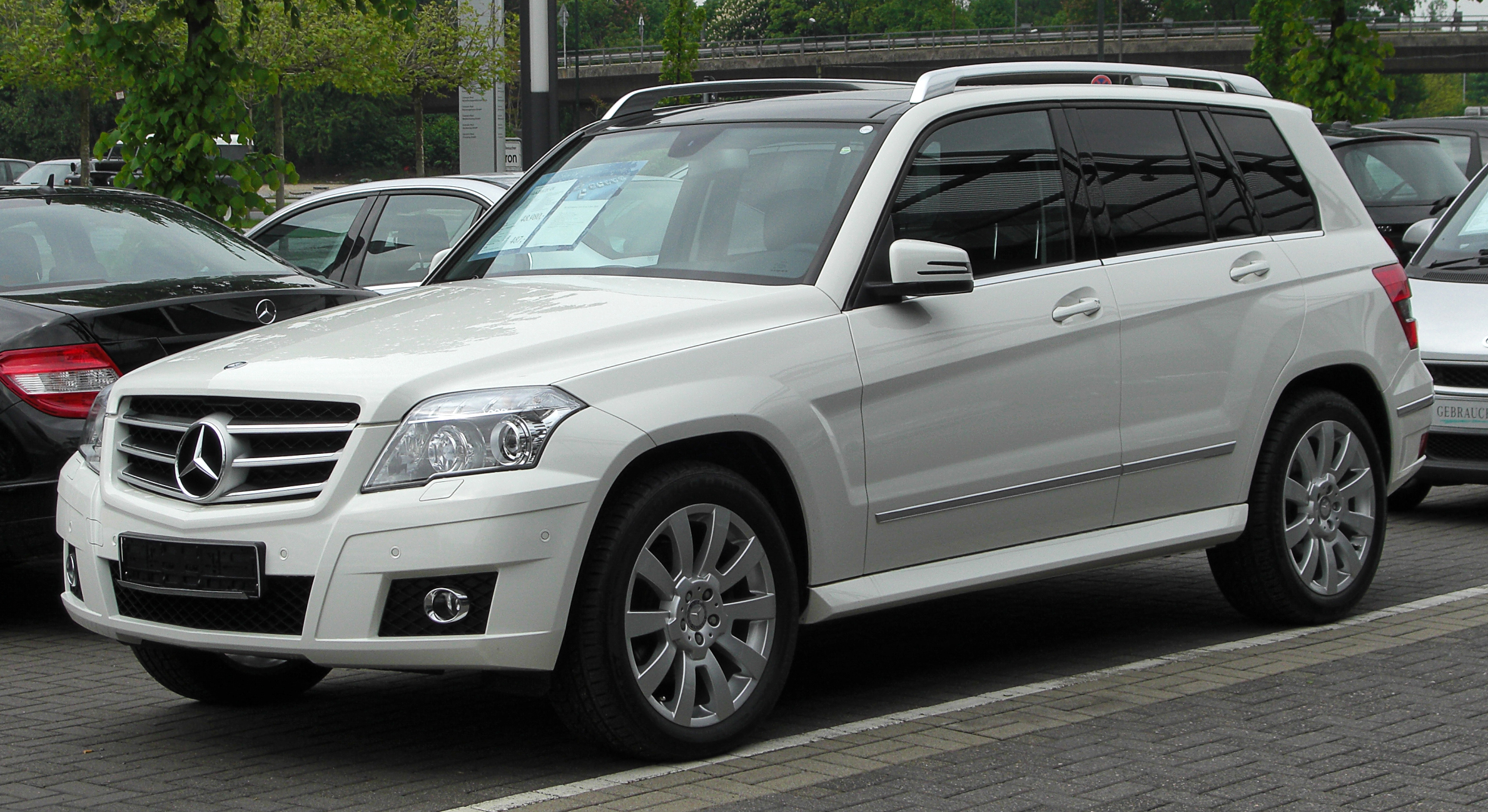

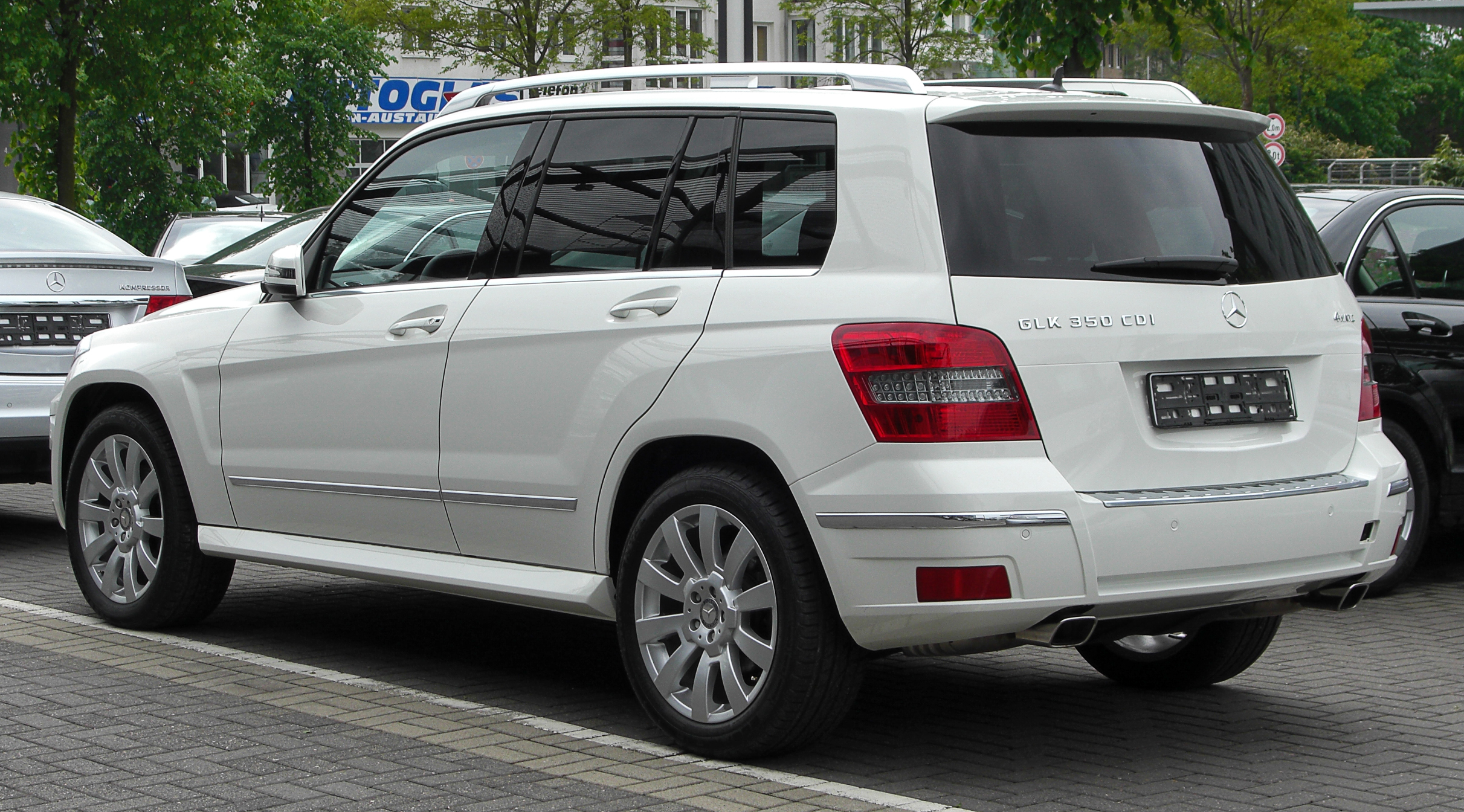
Mercedes-Benz GLK 350 CDI 4MATIC (Germany; pre-facelift)

The GLK has a comprehensive restraint system which consists of seatbelt tensioners and nine airbags, which are deployed selectively depending on the type of collision and its severity to reduce the forces exerted on the occupants.

2015 Mercedes GLK on IIHS:
Category	Rating
Moderate overlap frontal offset	Good
Side impact	Good
Roof strength	Good
Head restraints & seats	Good

^{1} vehicle structure rated "Good"
^{2} strength-to-weight ratio: 6.41

Euro NCAP test results Mercedes-Benz GLK-Class, Small Off-Road (2010)
Test	Points	%
Overall:	5 /5 stars	
Adult occupant:	32	89%
Child occupant:	37	76%
Pedestrian:	17	47%
Safety assist:	6	86%

=== Engines ===
Petrol engines
Model	Years	Type	Power, torque@rpm
GLK 280 4MATIC	2008–2009	2,996 cc (183 cu in) 24V V6 (M 272 DE 30)	231 PS (170 kW; 228 hp)@6000, 300 N⋅m (221 lb⋅ft)@2500–5000
GLK 300 4MATIC	2009–2011	2,996 cc (183 cu in) 24V V6 (M 272 DE 30)	231 PS (170 kW; 228 hp)@6000, 300 N⋅m (221 lb⋅ft)@2500–5000
GLK 350 4MATIC	2008–2012	3,498 cc (213 cu in) 24V V6 (M 272 DE 35)	272 PS (200 kW; 268 hp)@6000, 350 N⋅m (258 lb⋅ft)@2400–5000

Diesel engines
Model	Years	Type	Power, torque@rpm
GLK 200 CDI BlueEFFICIENCY	2010–2012	2,143 cc (131 cu in) 16V I4 turbo (OM 651 DE 22 LA red.)	143 PS (105 kW; 141 hp)@3200–4600, 350 N⋅m (258 lb⋅ft)@1200–2800
GLK 220 CDI BlueEFFICIENCY	2009–2012	2,143 cc (131 cu in) 16V I4 turbo (OM 651 DE 22 LA red.)	170 PS (125 kW; 168 hp)@3200–4200, 400 N⋅m (295 lb⋅ft)@1400–2800
GLK 220 CDI 4MATIC BlueEFFICIENCY	2009–2012	2,143 cc (131 cu in) 16V I4 turbo (OM 651 DE 22 LA red.)	170 PS (125 kW; 168 hp)@3200–4200, 400 N⋅m (295 lb⋅ft)@1400–2800
GLK 250 CDI 4MATIC BlueEFFICIENCY	2009–2012	2,143 cc (131 cu in) 16V I4 turbo (OM 651 DE 22 LA red.)	204 PS (150 kW; 201 hp)@4200, 500 N⋅m (369 lb⋅ft)@1600–1800
GLK 320 CDI 4MATIC	2008–2009	2,987 cc (182 cu in) 24V V6 turbo (OM 642 DE 30 LA)	224 PS (165 kW; 221 hp)@3800, 540 N⋅m (398 lb⋅ft)@1600–2400
GLK 350 CDI 4MATIC (224PS)	2009–2010	2,987 cc (182 cu in) 24V V6 turbo (OM 642 DE 30 LA)	224 PS (165 kW; 221 hp)@3800, 540 N⋅m (398 lb⋅ft)@1600–2400
GLK 350 CDI 4MATIC (231PS)	2010–2012	2,987 cc (182 cu in) 24V V6 turbo (OM 642 DE 30 LA)	231 PS (170 kW; 228 hp)@3800, 540 N⋅m (398 lb⋅ft)@1600–2400

In 2009, the GLK 280 4Matic and GLK 320 CDI 4Matic were replaced by the GLK 300 4Matic and GLK 350 CDI 4Matic respectively.

=== Production ===
In December 2011, the first locally produced Mercedes-Benz GLK was made in the Beijing production plant of Beijing Benz Automotive Co., Ltd. (BBAC).

At the end of July 2008, Mercedes-Benz had received a total of 10,000 orders for a GLK-Class vehicle, with 1000 orders for the Edition 1 vehicles.

As of Nov 03, 2008, 25,000 orders have been placed for the GLK-Class in Western Europe, with delivery beginning in 2008-10-18.

=== Marketing ===
As part of the GLK product launch prior to the 2008 Detroit Auto Show debut, a prototype GLK appeared in the Sex and the City movie.

As part of the GLK product launch, the www.mercedes-glk.com web site was unveiled, which features an interactive music video that users can help to design, as well as a “GLK Backstage” section for discussions with the engineers who created the new model.

As part of US product launch with the SEMA concepts, visitors could cast vote for the favourite customized GLK vehicles, with winner of the “Tuner Challenge” announced on 2 December.

=== 2012 update ===
The vehicle was unveiled at the 2012 New York International Auto Show.

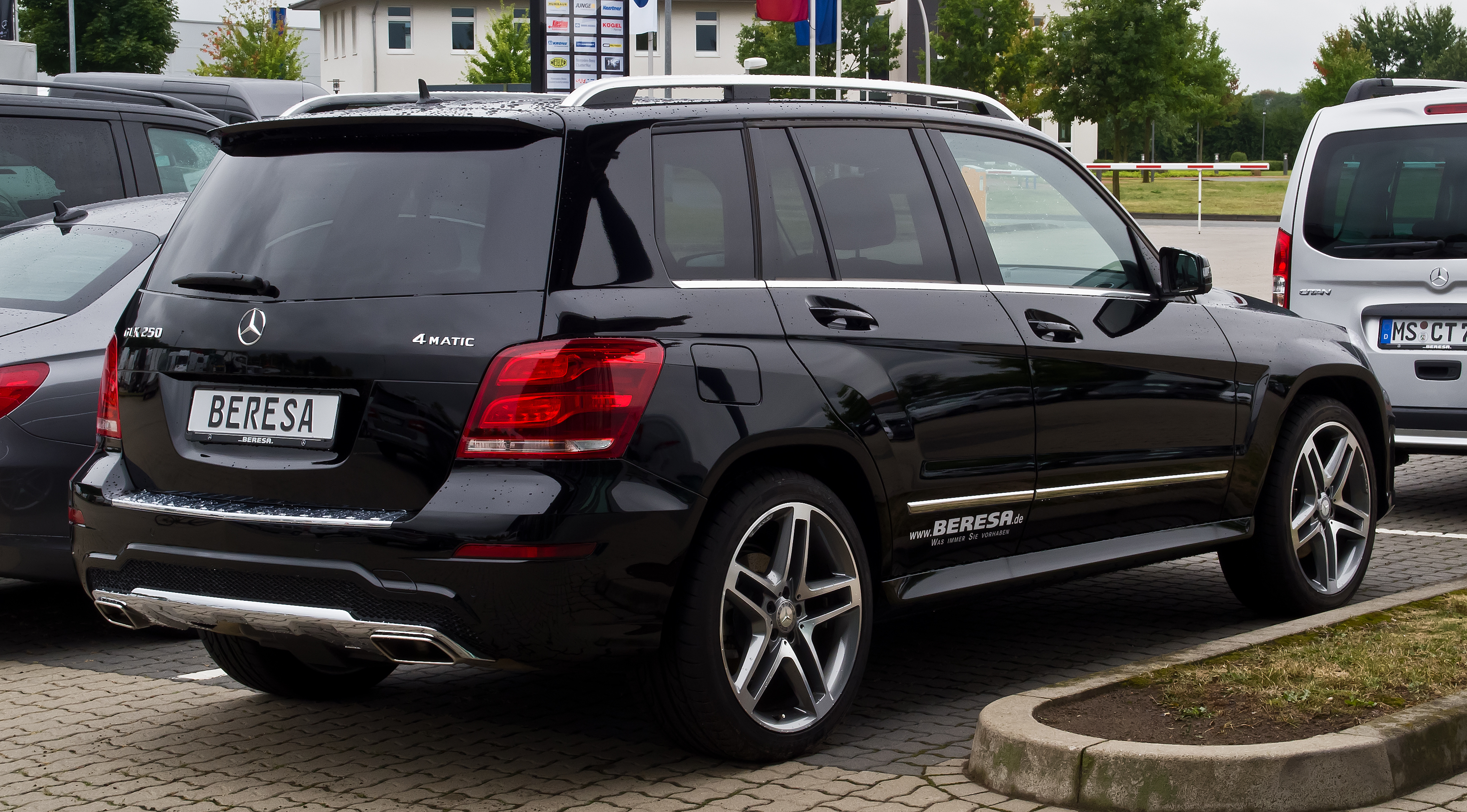
Mercedes-Benz GLK 250 4MATIC (Germany; facelift)

Early models include the GLK 200 CDI BlueEFFICIENCY, GLK 220 CDI BlueEFFICIENCY, GLK 220 CDI 4MATIC BlueEFFICIENCY, GLK 220 BlueTEC 4MATIC, GLK 250 BlueTEC 4MATIC, GLK 350 CDI 4MATIC BlueEFFICIENCY and the GLK 350 4MATIC BlueEFFICIENCY.

Early US models include the GLK 350 and GLK 350 4MATIC BlueEFFICIENCY as a 2013 year model with sales beginning in summer 2012, followed by the GLK 250 BlueTEC 4MATIC in early 2013.

==== Engines ====
Petrol engines
Model	Years	Type	Power, torque@rpm
GLK 200	2013–2015	1,991 cc (121 cu in) 16V I4 (M274 DE20)	184 PS (135 kW; 181 hp)@6500, 300 N⋅m (221 lb⋅ft)@1200–4000
GLK 250	2013–2015	1,991 cc (121 cu in) 16V I4 (M274 DE20)	211 PS (155 kW; 208 hp)@5500, 350 N⋅m (258 lb⋅ft)@1200–4000
GLK 350	2013–2015	3,498 cc (213 cu in) 24V V6 (M276 DE35)	306 PS (225 kW; 302 hp)@6500, 370 N⋅m (273 lb⋅ft)@3500–5250
GLK 350 4MATIC BlueEFFICIENCY	2012–2015	3,498 cc (213 cu in) 24V V6 (M276 DE35)	306 PS (225 kW; 302 hp)@6500, 370 N⋅m (273 lb⋅ft)@3500–5250

Diesel engines
Model	Years	Type	Power, torque@rpm
GLK 200 CDI BlueEFFICIENCY	2012–2015	2,143 cc (131 cu in) 16V I4 turbo (OM651 DE22 LA R)	143 PS (105 kW; 141 hp)@3200–4600, 350 N⋅m (258 lb⋅ft)@1200–2800
GLK 220 CDI BlueEFFICIENCY	2012–2015	2,143 cc (131 cu in) 16V I4 turbo (OM651 DE22 LA R)	170 PS (125 kW; 168 hp)@3200–4200, 400 N⋅m (295 lb⋅ft)@1400–2800
GLK 220 CDI 4MATIC BlueEfficiency	2012–2015	2,143 cc (131 cu in) 16V I4 turbo (OM651 DE22 LA R)	170 PS (125 kW; 168 hp)@3200–4200, 400 N⋅m (295 lb⋅ft)@1400–2800
GLK 220 BlueTEC 4MATIC	2012–2015	2,143 cc (131 cu in) 16V I4 turbo (OM651 DE22 LA R)	170 PS (125 kW; 168 hp)@3200–4200, 400 N⋅m (295 lb⋅ft)@1400–2800
GLK 250 BlueTEC 4MATIC	2012–2015	2,143 cc (131 cu in) 16V I4 turbo (OM651 DE22 LA R)	204 PS (150 kW; 201 hp)@4200, 500 N⋅m (369 lb⋅ft)@1600–2800
GLK 350 CDI 4MATIC BlueEFFICIENCY	2012–2015	2,987 cc (182 cu in) 24V V6 turbo (OM642 LS DE30 LA)	265 PS (195 kW; 261 hp)@3800, 620 N⋅m (457 lb⋅ft)@1600–2400

All gasoline engines include ECO start/stop function and direct fuel injection.

=== Production and sales ===
Calendar year	Production	US sales
2008		
2009		21,944
2010		20,946
2011	93,836	24,310
2012	109,813	29,364
2013		32,553
2014		35,000
