= Automotive Financial Group =

British company

Automotive Financial Group (AFG)
- Industry: Automotive retailing
- Predecessor: Datsun UK; Nissan UK
- Founded: 1985
- Founder: Octav Botnar
- Defunct: 1994
- Fate: Sold to the Barclay brothers in 1994
- Headquarters: Worthing, East Sussex, England
- Number of locations: 200+ dealerships across the United Kingdom

Automotive Financial Group (normally styled as AFG) was a British company specialising in automotive retailing and the sale of associated products and services. The company was founded by the Austro-Hungarian businessman Octav Botnar in 1985 as an extension of his successful Nissan import and distribution company, Nissan UK.

== History and background ==
Botnar had successfully built up his successful business since 1970, importing and marketing Datsun and Nissan cars in the United Kingdom. By 1980, the firm had achieved an overall market share of 6% and the UK was the only export market where Nissan outsold its arch rival Toyota. Botnar achieved this by appointing a network of small, family owned dealers (many of whom were former franchisees of the British Motor Corporation and British Leyland) to sell Datsun and by placing an emphasis on customer service. However, by the 1980s it had become clear that many of these businesses were too small to handle the vast amount of extra used stock and servicing/repair work that was now being generated.

The solution Botnar arrived at was to buy out many of these smaller businesses to create a conglomerate that would allow larger, more profitable sites to be developed. At its peak, the resulting company operated 220 car dealerships in the UK, specialising in Nissan vehicles; approximately 160 of the 220 sites held Nissan franchises. By the end of the 1980s, however, Nissan had established an assembly plant in Sunderland and was considering taking the existing Japanese import and distribution business in house. Negotiations with Botnar over a possible take-over of Nissan UK began in 1988.

Disputes began to emerge between executives of Nissan in Japan and Botnar over pricing of the then new Nissan Primera in 1990. Nissan was pitching the Primera further upmarket, which was at odds with AFG's marketing of Nissan as a value-focused brand which it had been since the Datsun era. Nissan in Japan had also had shown its distaste towards Botnar's notoriously ruthless business practices which clashed with their own corporate values.

This, coupled with controversies surrounding alleged tax fraud implying certain AFG and Nissan UK executives (including Botnar himself), Nissan set up its own import and distribution business within the UK, appointing an all-new network of dealers. In 1991, Nissan terminated the supply of new vehicles to Nissan UK and AFG. The company was sold in 1994 to the Barclay brothers for £200 million.

As parts of the company were sold off, the remaining operations, under the name Caledonia Motor Group, refocused on sales of Fiat, Alfa Romeo, Citroën, Peugeot and Renault in north-west England. Caledonia launched a major expansion programme in 1998 to increase its dealership network, buying six sites in north-west England that were owned by United North West.

In 1999, the company was subject to a management buyout. By 2000, it was operating nine franchises from eleven dealerships. However, it dropped its Renault franchise in 2002, selling the dealerships to Sunwin, Renault Retail Group and Arnold Clark. In 2006, it lost its Alfa Romeo dealer franchise, which resulted in the group only being able to provide servicing for cars.

In 2008, the company was placed in receivership; the remaining sites were acquired by Cambria Automobiles and became part of its Motor Parks chain.
