= Mercedes-Benz M270/M274 engine =

Mercedes-Benz M270/M274
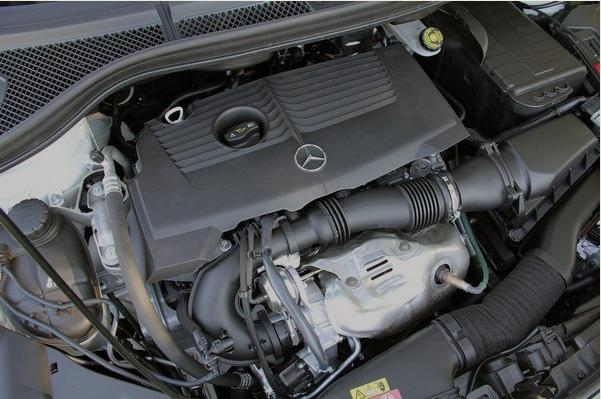

Overview
- Manufacturer: Mercedes-Benz
- Production: 2011 – present

Layout
- Configuration: Inline 4
- Displacement: 1.6 L (1,595 cc) (M270/M274 DE16); 2.0 L (1,991 cc) (M270/M274 DE20)
- Cylinder bore: 83 mm (3.27 in)
- Piston stroke: 73.7 mm (2.90 in) (1.6 L); 92 mm (3.62 in) (2.0 L)
- Cylinder block material: Aluminium alloy
- Cylinder head material: Aluminium alloy
- Valvetrain: DOHC 4 valves x cyl. with VVT
- Compression ratio: 10.3:1 (1.6 L engines); 9.8:1 (2.0 L engines)

Combustion
- Supercharger: BorgWarner's e-Booster (2019–)
- Turbocharger: Single-turbo
- Fuel system: Direct injection
- Fuel type: Gasoline
- Cooling system: Water cooled

Output
- Power output: 75–180 kW (101–241 hp; 102–245 PS)
- Torque output: 180–370 N⋅m (133–273 lb⋅ft)

Chronology
- Predecessor: M266 and M271
- Successor: M260/M264 and M282

The M270 and M274 are turbocharged inline-four engines produced by Mercedes-Benz since 2011. They are the successor to the previous M266 and M271 engines respectively. The engine appeared on the Ward's 10 Best Engines list for 2017.

== Design ==
M270 refers to the transverse configuration for front-wheel drive vehicles, while M274 refers to the longitudinally-mounted layout for rear-wheel drive vehicles. Both engines are based on the same design with dual overhead camshafts, 4 valves per cylinder, variable valve timing, direct injection, and compliance with the EU6 emissions standard. A 2.0 litres (1,991 cc) engine was introduced in September 2012 featuring an increased piston stroke up to 92 mm (3.62 in), increased performance figures, and a 9.8:1 compression ratio. The M274 engine was also used on the Infiniti Q50 since 2014.

== M270 engine ==
Engine	Displacement	Power	Torque	Years
M270 DE16; LA R	1.6 L; 97.3 cu in (1,595 cc)	75 kW (101 hp; 102 PS) at 4,500–6,000 rpm	180 N⋅m (133 lb⋅ft) at 1,200–3,500 rpm	2015–
M270 DE16; LA R	1.6 L; 97.3 cu in (1,595 cc)	90 kW (121 hp; 122 PS) at 5,000 rpm	200 N⋅m (148 lb⋅ft) at 1,250–4,000 rpm	2011–
M270 DE16; LA	1.6 L; 97.3 cu in (1,595 cc)	115 kW (154 hp; 156 PS) at 5,000 rpm	250 N⋅m (184 lb⋅ft) at 1,250–4,000 rpm	2011–
M270 DE20; LA	2.0 L; 121.5 cu in (1,991 cc)	115 kW (154 hp; 156 PS) at 5,000 rpm	270 N⋅m (199 lb⋅ft) at 1,250–4,000 rpm	2013–
M270 DE20; LA	2.0 L; 121.5 cu in (1,991 cc)	135 kW (181 hp; 184 PS) at 5,000 rpm	300 N⋅m (221 lb⋅ft) at 1,250–4,000 rpm	2013–
M270 DE20; LA	2.0 L; 121.5 cu in (1,991 cc)	155 kW (208 hp; 211 PS) at 5,500 rpm	350 N⋅m (258 lb⋅ft) at 1,200–4,000 rpm	2012–
M270 DE20; LA	2.0 L; 121.5 cu in (1,991 cc)	160 kW (215 hp; 218 PS) at 5,500 rpm	350 N⋅m (258 lb⋅ft) at 1,200–4,000 rpm	2015–

=== M270 DE16 LA R ===
75 kW version

- 2015–2018 A 160 (W176)
- 2015–2018 B 160 (W246)

90 kW version

- 2011–2018 B 180 (W246)
- 2012–2018 A 180 (W176)
- 2013–2019 CLA 180 (C117)
- 2015–2019 GLA 180 (X156)

=== M270 DE16 LA ===
- 2011–2018 B 200 (W246)
- 2012–2018 A 200 (W176)
- 2013–2019 CLA 200 (C117)
- 2014–2019 GLA 200 (X156)

=== M270 DE20 LA ===
115 kW version

- 2013–2018 B 200 Natural Gas Drive (W246)

135 kW version

- 2013–2018 B 220 4MATIC (W246)
- 2014–2018 A 220 4MATIC (W176)
- 2016–2018 CLA 220 4MATIC (C117)

155 kW version

- 2012–2018 A 250 (W176)
- 2012–2018 B 250 (W246)
- 2013–2019 CLA 250 (C117)
- 2013–2019 GLA 250 (X156)
- 2015–2019 Infiniti Q30
- 2016–2019 Infiniti QX30

160 kW version

- 2015–2018 A 250 Sport (W176)
- 2015–2019 CLA 250 Sport (C117)

== M274 engine ==
Engine	Displacement	Power	Torque	Years
M274 DE16; LA D274.910	1.6 L; 97.3 cu in (1,595 cc)	95 kW (127 hp; 129 PS) at 5,000 rpm	210 N⋅m (155 lb⋅ft) at 1,200–4,000 rpm	2015–
M274 DE16; LA D274.910	1.6 L; 97.3 cu in (1,595 cc)	115 kW (154 hp; 156 PS) at 5,300 rpm	250 N⋅m (184 lb⋅ft) at 1,250–4,000 rpm	2012–
M274 DE20; LA D274.920	2.0 L; 121.5 cu in (1,991 cc)	115 kW (154 hp; 156 PS) at 5,000 rpm	270 N⋅m (199 lb⋅ft) at 1,250–4,000 rpm	2013–
M274 DE20; LA D274.920	2.0 L; 121.5 cu in (1,991 cc)	135 kW (181 hp; 184 PS) at 5,500 rpm	300 N⋅m (221 lb⋅ft) at 1,200–4,000 rpm	2013–
M274 DE20; LA D274.920	2.0 L; 121.5 cu in (1,991 cc)	155 kW (208 hp; 211 PS) at 5,500 rpm	350 N⋅m (258 lb⋅ft) at 1,200–4,000 rpm	2013–
M274 DE20; LA D274.920	2.0 L; 121.5 cu in (1,991 cc)	180 kW (241 hp; 245 PS) at 5,500 rpm	370 N⋅m (273 lb⋅ft) at 1,300–4,000 rpm	2015–
M274 DE20; LA D274.920	2.0 L; 121.5 cu in (1,991 cc)	189 kW (253 hp; 257 PS) at 5,800 – 6,100 rpm	370 N⋅m (273 lb⋅ft) at 1,300–4,000 rpm	2019–

=== M274 DE16 LA ===
95 kW version

- 2015–2019 C 160 (W205)

115 kW version

- 2012–2013 C 180 (W204)
- 2014–2019 C 180 (W205)
- 2013–2016 E 180 (W212)
- 2016–2020 E 180 (W213)
- 2015–2020 SLC 180 (R172)

=== M274 DE20 LA ===
115 kW version

- 2013–2016 E 200 Natural Gas Drive (W212)

135 kW version

- 2013–2016 E 200 (W212)
- 2013–2016 GLK 200 (X204)
- 2014–2018 C 200 (W205)
- 2015–2020 SLC 200 (R172)
- 2016-2020 E 200 (W213)
- 2019-2023 Sprinter (W907)

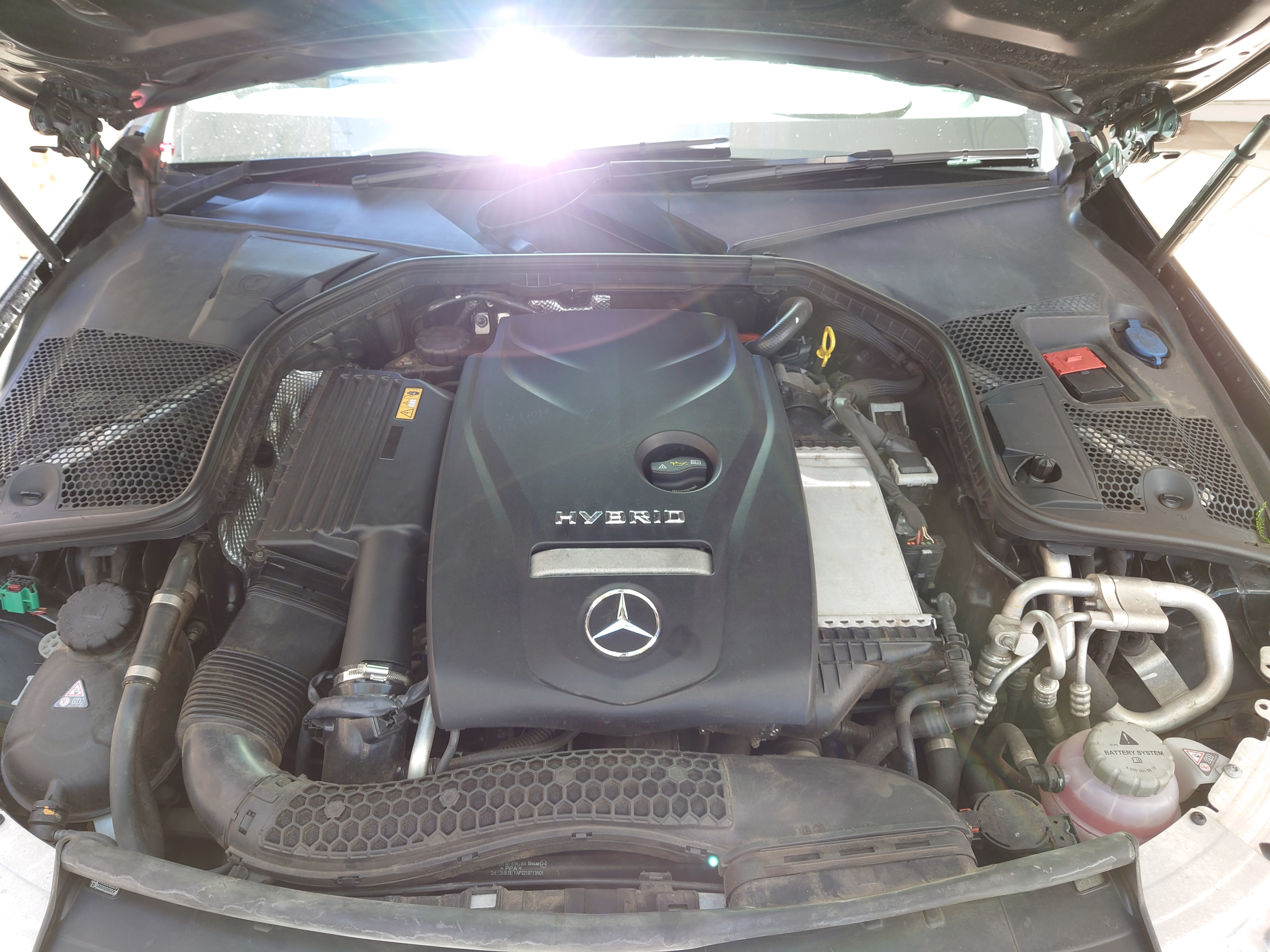

155 kW version

- 2013–2016 E 250 (W212)
- 2013–2016 GLK 250 (X204)
- 2016–2019 GLC 250 4MATIC (X253)
- 2014–2018 C 250 (W205)
- 2015–2018 C 350e (W205)
- 2018–2021 C 300e (W205)
- 2015–2019 V37 Q50/Nissan Skyline (2014-2019; 200GT-t DBA-ZV37/DBA-YV37)
- 2016–2018 E 250 (W213)
- 2016–2018 E 350e (W213)
- 2018–2023 E 300e (W213)
- 2015–2019 GLC 350e 4MATIC (X253)
- 2019–2022 GLC 300e 4MATIC (X253)
- 2016–present V 250 (W447) (Chinese market)
- 2016-2023 Metris (W447)
- 2016–present CV37 Q60
- 2015–2019 Y51 Q70

180 kW version

- 2015–2018 C 300 (W205)
- 2015–2018 E 300 (W213)
- 2015–2019 SLC 300 (R172)
- 2015–2019 GLC 300 / GLC 300 4MATIC (X253)
