= Mercedes-Benz OM651 engine =

Mercedes-Benz OM651
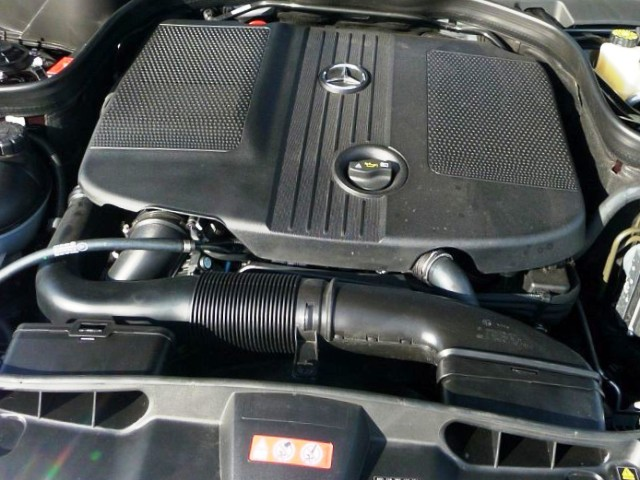

Overview
- Manufacturer: Mercedes-Benz
- Production: 2008–present

Layout
- Configuration: Inline-4
- Displacement: 1,796 cc (1.796 L); 2,143 cc (2.143 L)
- Cylinder bore: 83 mm (3.27 in)
- Piston stroke: 83 mm (3.27 in); 99 mm (3.9 in)
- Cylinder block material: Cast iron
- Cylinder head material: Aluminium alloy
- Valvetrain: DOHC, chain-driven and gears
- Compression ratio: 16.2:1

Combustion
- Turbocharger: Single turbo / bi-turbo
- Fuel system: Common rail
- Fuel type: Diesel
- Cooling system: Water cooled

Output
- Power output: 80–150 kW (107–201 hp)

Chronology
- Predecessor: Mercedes-Benz OM646 engine
- Successor: Mercedes-Benz OM654 engine

The Mercedes-Benz OM651 is a family of inline-four diesel engines introduced by Mercedes-Benz in 2008.

== Design ==
The main goal was to create a common engine design that shared parts across the line.

One design requirement was that the engine could be mounted both longitudinally and transversely.

Improved fuel efficiency and compliance with Euro 5 emission standards were other design objectives, by 2010 updated to the Euro 6 standard. Four piezo-electric injectors fed with high pressure fuel from a common rail inject fuel directly into the combustion chambers to improve combustion compared to previous diesel engines while recirculated exhaust gas reduces the oxygen in the cylinders to "starve" any reactions that would produce NO(x).

== Variants ==
Of the 6 variants, 4 have the same 2.2-litre swept volume, tuned to different power outputs 120 PS (88 kW) (badged x180 on rear-wheel drive models), 136 PS (100 kW) or 143 PS (105 kW) (badged x200 on rear-wheel drive models), 163 PS (120 kW) or 170 PS (125 kW) (badged x220) to 204 PS (150 kW) (badged x250). The 163 PS (120 kW), 170 PS (125 kW) and 204 PS (150 kW) versions employ a 2-stage (bi-turbo) charging setup with a small, high pressure turbo providing quick boost at low rpm fed by a large, lower pressure turbo providing increased performance at higher rpm, then at highest rpm ranges and loads, both were active. The lower output versions have a single turbocharger.

Two shorter stroke "square" variants had 1.8-litre displacement 109 PS (80 kW) (badged A/B180) and 136 PS (100 kW) (badged A/B200 and were used in smaller front-wheel drive models like the A-B class). These two variants differ only in electronic tune, and have a single turbocharger.

== See also ==
- List of Mercedes-Benz engines
