= Octav Botnar =

Romanian businessman (1913 - 1998)

Octav Botnar (born Oswald Bundorf; October 21, 1913 – July 11, 1998) was a self-made businessman who founded Datsun UK (later Nissan UK) and its associated car retail business Automotive Financial Group (AFG). He was a noted philanthropist.

== Early life ==
Botnar was born in Chernivtsi, which was then called Czernowitz and was in Austria-Hungary. During his childhood, in 1918, Austria-Hungary was dissolved and the city was renamed Cernăuți and became part of Romania. The city is now in Ukraine.

Between 1932 and 1936, he was imprisoned by the Romanian authorities for communist activities, and then he voluntarily enlisted to fight in the Spanish Civil War. After being turned down at the border, he moved to France, where he joined the Marching Regiments of Foreign Volunteers and then the French Resistance, and fought against the Nazis in World War II. He returned to Romania in 1946, where he worked at the Chamber of Commerce. In 1951, he married Marcela Perian, who gave birth the next year to their only child, Camelia.

In 1960, the Securitate removed the Jewish employees from the Ministry of Foreign Trade, allegedly for undermining the national economy. Botnar, who belonged to this group, was again imprisoned between 1961 and 1965. Released, he emigrated in 1966 to Israel, where he entered the cement business. He then went to Germany, where he worked as a director in the NSU car company, later acquired by Volkswagen. He ended up in Worthing in England, where he founded Datsun UK (now Nissan UK) in 1970.

== Datsun and Nissan UK ==
Botnar had originally run the UK import business for the German manufacturer NSU. However this business was dissolved when NSU was taken over by Volkswagen in 1969 (ultimately becoming Audi), and Botnar was looking for a new venture. He successfully became the UK franchisee and importer for Nissan, and its Datsun range of cars. Under Botnar's leadership, Datsun had become one of the biggest car imports in Britain, outselling not only its arch Japanese rival Toyota but eventually became the most popular foreign brand in the UK. At its peak, Botnar owned more than 200 Nissan dealerships throughout the country and was considered one of Britain's wealthiest men.

== Philanthropy ==
Octav's only child, Camelia Botnar, was killed in a car crash near Stonehenge in 1972 at the age of 20. Her death led to a wave of philanthropy that saw Botnar donate millions to charity throughout his later life, which was at odds with his reputation as a ruthless businessman. One of his larger donations was £13 million to London's Great Ormond Street Hospital.

He also established the Camelia Botnar Foundation in his daughter's memory. The foundation, located in West Sussex, is still active today, providing residential training and work experience, helping young people to learn a skilled trade, embark on a useful career path and successfully make their own way in life.

== Tax controversy ==
In June 1991, the Inland Revenue raided Nissan UK's headquarters, as well as Mr Botnar's home and the homes of other company officials. The tax authority accused Botnar of evading more than £200 million in taxes. The scam involved using a third party shipping agent to deliberately overcharge Nissan UK for the shipment of vehicles from Japan so as to artificially depress its own profits thus reducing the company's exposure to corporation tax. Botnar left for Switzerland and lived for the rest of his life there in Villars-sur-Ollon. Nissan had increasingly become frustrated with Botnar's ruthless business practices which went against their own corporate culture, and eventually terminated the supply of vehicles to Botnar's companies.

The Nissan UK and AFG businesses subsequently foundered, after Nissan took its UK distribution and import activities completely in-house in 1991.

Although Botnar maintained his innocence up until his final hours, he had agreed to pay £59 million to settle the case. Following settling, he opened a suit against the Inland Revenue for damages and malicious prosecution. At the time he said: "The damages I am seeking are only token, but I want to clear my name. I want my day in court."

== Death ==
Botnar spent his last years as a tax exile in Switzerland fighting the British Inland Revenue.

He died on 11 July 1998 at the age of 84 after suffering from stomach cancer. He is buried in Passy Cemetery in Paris. Tory party chairman Lord Parkinson once described Botnar as "truly one of our greatest philanthropists".
