= Impound race =

Impound race may refer to one of the following:

- Impound race (NASCAR) - rules for NASCAR versions of impound races.
- Impound race - terminology definition in Glossary of motorsport terms.
- Parc fermé - terminology definition in Glossary of motorsport term.
- Parc fermé French term for FIA race rules.
