= Glossary of motorsport terms =

The following is a glossary of terminology used in motorsport, along with explanations of their meanings.

== 0–9 ==
1–2 finish
When two vehicles from the same team finish first and second in a race. Can be extended to 1–2–3 or 1–2–3–4, etc. depending on a combination of racing series and team size.

107% rule
Often used in Formula One or other racing series, it is a rule where the driver must qualify the car within 107% of the polesitter's time to be allowed to compete. Variations of this may be used to monitor drivers and warn them to reach the required pace or be parked (disqualified). Similarly, the IndyCar Series uses a 105% rule, and NASCAR has a 115% rule, mainly for performance on track, though IndyCar and NASCAR often adjust the threshold for tracks with very abrasive surfaces (such as Atlanta Motor Speedway) where lap times can be considerably faster with less worn tires.

200 MPH Club
A lifetime "membership" awarded by the SCTA or another sanctioning body or circuit to any driver who drives over a specified distance at a minimum speed of 200 miles per hour (320 km/h), while also breaking a record. Membership can stretch over from the more exclusive 300 to the elite 400. Also known as the 2 Club or Dirty Two Club for records taking place at El Mirage Lake.
60-foot time
In drag racing, the time taken for a vehicle to travel the first 60 feet (18 m) of the drag strip.
n-stop strategy
A pit stop strategy where a driver makes n stops throughout a race.

== A ==
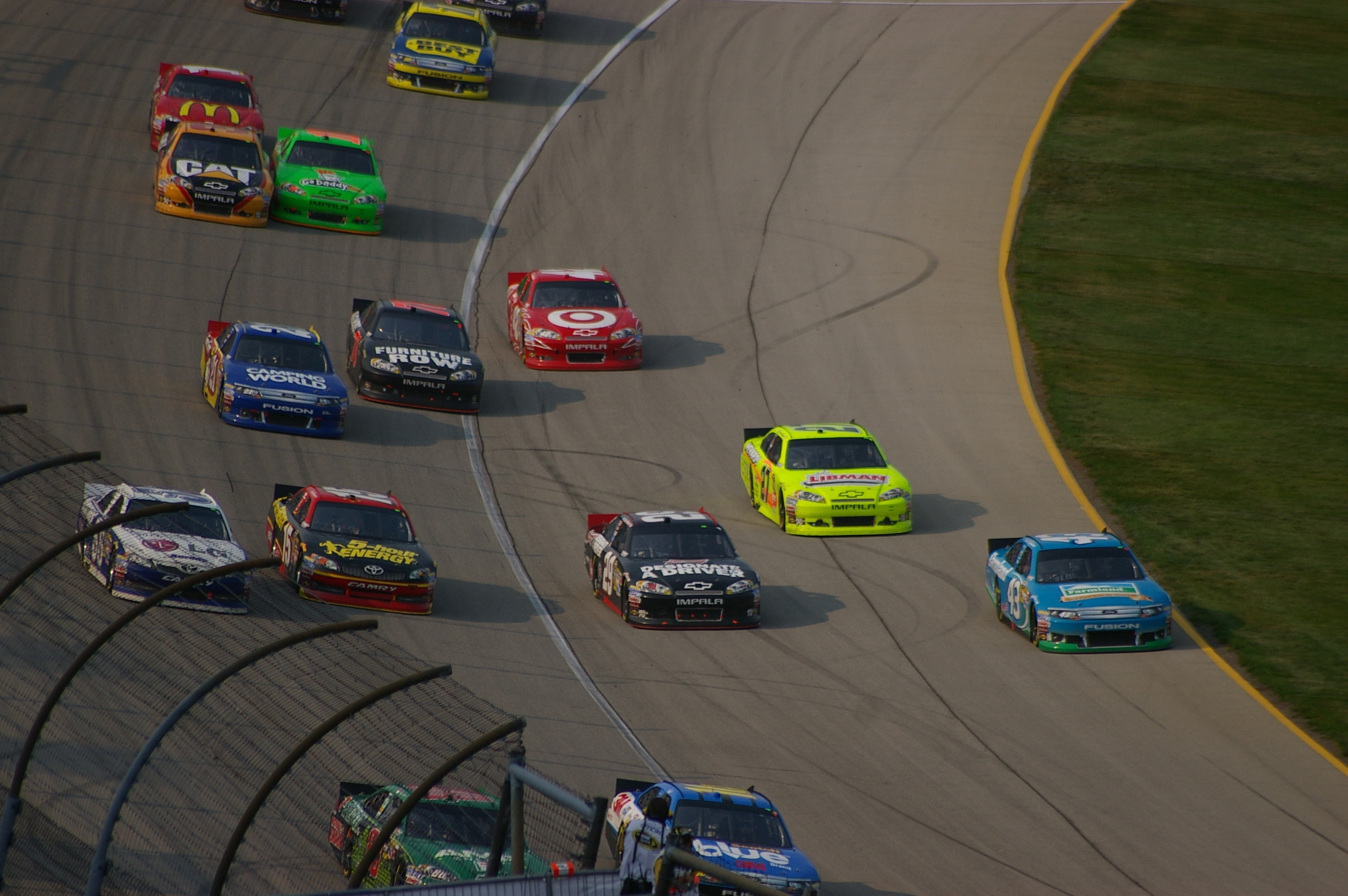
Four drivers race on the apron at Chicagoland Speedway—the innermost area of track between the white and yellow lines

aero cover
See wheel shroud.
air jacks
Pneumatic cylinders strategically mounted to the frame near the wheels of a racing car, which project downwards to lift the car off the ground during a pit stop to allow for quick tire changes or provide mechanics access to the underside of the car for repairs.
alphabet soup
In midget car and sprint car racing, and on many short tracks, alphabet soup denotes the various preliminary races drivers will race through to advance to the feature event. Such is named for the heat race format, from the O main at the Chili Bowl Nationals to the N, M, L, K, J, I, H, G, F, E, D, C, B, and finally A main. A driver who runs through the alphabet soup is a driver who has advanced from the lowest feature of the day and advanced to the A main.
apex
The part of a corner where the racing line is nearest the inside of the bend.
apron
An area of asphalt or concrete that separates the racing surface from the infield.
arrive-and-drive
A form of racing where the driver does not own or manage the vehicle, which is provided to the competitor upon entry. Particularly prevalent in kart racing.
auto racing
Alternative term for motorsport, largely American, although referring specifically to circuit and oval racing for cars, and excluding sports such as motorcycle racing, rallying and drifting.
autotesting
See gymkhana.

== B ==
B main
See semi-feature.
B-specification
A version of a car (or less commonly a power unit or other component) that has been changed to the point it is substantially different to its original specification, without warranting its own distinct name.
B-team
See satellite team.
back half
In drag racing, referring to distance from the 1/8-mile mark to the 1/4-mile mark of the track.
backmarker
A slower car, usually in the process of being lapped by the leaders. It is also used to describe teams that consistently perform poorly.
backup car
See spare car.
bag of donuts
In drag racing, a perfect reaction time of .000 seconds.
beam
In drag racing, the electric eye controlling the pre-stage and stage lights at the starting line.
banking
The angle at which a track inclines towards the outside of a corner (or from the lower to the higher side of a straight). Also referred to as camber (see below), more commonly when modest or negative (i.e. "off-camber").
The Big One
A large pileup during a stock car race involving up to 30 cars. The term is largely reserved for restrictor plate racing at Daytona and Talladega.
binning it
Crashing out of a session.
black-flagged
To be ordered to the pits or penalty box, due to a violation of the rules or an unsafe car (loose parts, smoking, leaking fluid, etc.). A black flag is shown to the car that has to stop. Also known as being "posted".
blend line
A painted line defining the area where the pit lane rejoins the race track, and prevents cars exiting the pit from driving into race traffic travelling past the pits, or vice versa. Competitors are penalised for crossing the blend line, ensuring that exiting cars have reached sufficient speed before rejoining the race.
bleach box
In drag racing, an area where bleach is deposited for cars to perform burnouts at the start of most drag races. Gasoline (since discontinued for safety reasons), water, and TrackBite are also used; most organisations only permit water.
blow
See blown.
blower
A supercharger; in the 1990s, these were generally labelled as "power adders" alongside turbochargers and nitrous.
blown
An engine that is supercharged (i.e. a blown engine). Alternatively, an engine that has suffered catastrophic failure, is no longer running, or has sustained irreparable damage.
blowover
Flipping of a car or boat, due to excessive air under the chassis or hull, respectively.
bottle
In drag racing, the gas cylinder containing nitrous. Also called a jug.
bottoming / bottoming out
When the bottom of the chassis touches the track.
box
A mostly European term used by people at the pit wall to tell a driver to perform a pit stop. In NASCAR, it is rarely mentioned outside of earning a penalty for conducting work on the car while not within the bounds of the team's pit stall.
breakout
In bracket racing, a run quicker than the projected "dial-in" time (see dial-in below). Grounds for disqualification if opponent does not commit a foul start or cross boundary lines. Also known as a bustout.
bump and run
A move with origins in stock car racing, where a trailing car intentionally bumps the car in front in an attempt to pass.
burnout
The act of spinning the driven wheels in place to heat the tires up for better traction. It is also used in stock car racing, typically to celebrate a race win.
Buschwhacker / claim jumper (2008–14) / signal pirate (2015–) / Cup leech
In NASCAR, a driver who regularly races in the first-tier NASCAR Cup Series, but makes guest or semi-regular appearances racing in the second-tier NASCAR Xfinity Series. The term was named originally for the then-sponsor of the second-tier series, the Anheuser-Busch brewery. Claim jumper was a reference to second-tier sponsor Nationwide Insurance (2008–14), and signal pirate references current second-tier sponsor Comcast Xfinity, with Cup leech used as a sponsor-neutral term.

== C ==
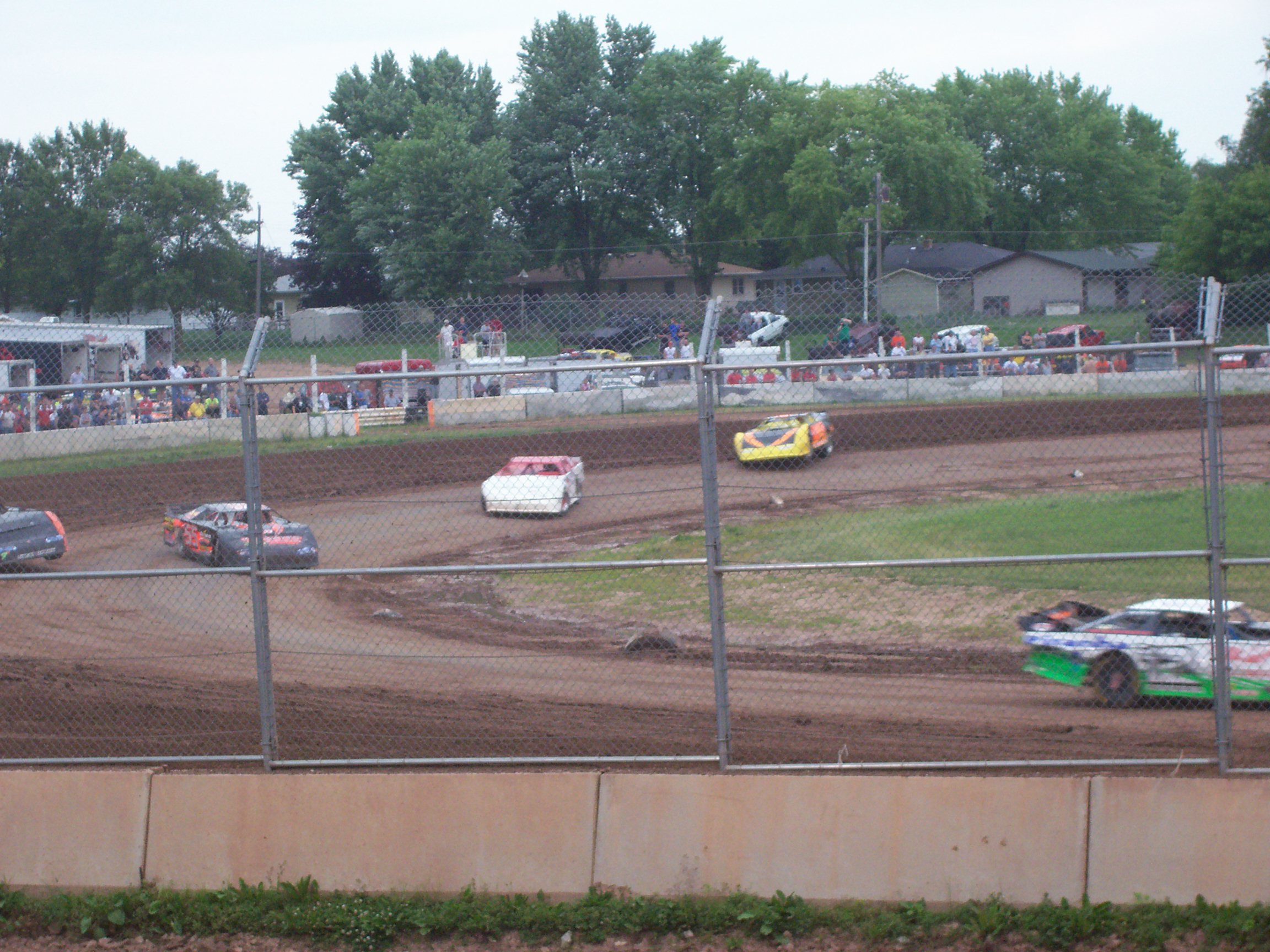
Catch fence at an American dirt track

camber
A.) The angle at which wheels are set up to tilt in or out, measured in degrees in or out from 90 degrees. Positive camber means the top of the tyre is angled outwards from the car; negative camber means that the top tilts inwards. Negative camber assists cornering performance, as the outside tires lean into the corner (like on a motorcycle), which reduces lateral forces on the tire and causes less flex in the sidewall, although it does also have the effect of increasing tire wear.: B.) Banking (see above), the angle at which a corner inclines towards the outside (or a straight from its lower side to its higher side). Sometimes specified as positive camber and negative camber, the latter indicating a decline from the inside of a corner.
catch fence
A fence made of chain-link fencing, welded grid fencing, and/or cables used to slow or stop out-of-control cars and prevent debris from hitting the crowd. They are common on short tracks, street circuits, and permanent circuits.
catch tank / catch can
A receptacle placed in a go-kart to capture liquids, like water and oil, that would otherwise drop onto the track. Also known as a recovery tank.
caution / caution period
See full-course yellow.
chase vehicle
In off-road racing, a non-competitive vehicle that follows a competing vehicle to assist with repairs.
chicane
An artificial corner or set of corners added to the natural course of a track to slow cars or create a passing zone.

choose cone
The cone (or painted chevron) at which drivers have to pick if they want to take inside or outside in oval racing during a restart.
Christmas tree
The series of lights in drag racing that signal the approach and start of a race, in addition to showing starting violations.
course record
Fastest recorded lap at a circuit.
clean air
Air that has not been affected by turbulence from other cars. The opposite of dirty air.
clerk of the course
The official responsible for all on-track activities, including demonstrations and parades. They oversee track conditions, supervise marshals and emergency services, control the deployment of the safety car, and decide upon suspending a session. If a race director is appointed, the clerk is junior and the race director has ultimate authority; if not, they are often the most senior official at a racing event.
closing/shutting the door
An early defensive racing line taken into a corner to block the car behind from overtaking along the preferred line.
co-driver
In rallying, a co-driver directs the driver through the course by reading navigational instructions from the road book, and pacenotes on special stages which describe the turns and obstacles ahead. Also historically called a navigator, the co-driver is also permitted to drive the car. The term is also used in long-distance sports car and touring car racing (particularly endurance racing), where multiple drivers share the same vehicle.
competition caution
A preplanned full-course yellow, mandated by the sanctioning body, where drivers bring their vehicles into the pits. Frequently done to change tires because of excessive tire wear, or to prevent teams from having to hire specialised pit crews (see controlled caution). In some cases, the safety car only is applied after a set number of consecutive green-flag laps or time has been run without a safety car (typically 50-100 laps). A cash or points bonus may be paid to the team leading at the time of the period (such as end-of-stage competition cautions in NASCAR's national series).
control
Where series organisers specify that all competitors in the race must use an identical part; as in control tire or control engine.
controlled caution
During a safety car period, teams can change tires and refuel within a limited time window (2-5 laps or five minutes) to make adjustments. Depending on the series, teams will either not lose any track position (if it is an interval break) or will not lose their position relative to the cars that pitted during the caution (for example, if the third-, fourth-, and eighth-place cars pit during the caution, they will be the first-, second-, and third-place cars exiting the pit lane, and will start behind lead-lap cars that did not pit, in the same relative order as before the safety car).
count-back
A tiebreaking system where drivers on level points are classified based on their highest placements across the season. First, they are ordered by number of wins, then by number of second-places, and etcetera. If this does not break the tie, then an additional tiebreaker may be used: Formula One uses qualifying positions, the IndyCar Series declares a draw.
crate motor
An engine that is ready-built and sealed by an independent company. Crate motors are sometimes mandated and sometimes optional. They are commonly used in regional touring series down to local tracks, and in divisions from late models on down. Crate motors are implemented to limit costs and ensure that the entire field has the same equipment. The ARCA Racing Series and NASCAR Gander Outdoors Truck Series have an optional 396 cu in (6.49 L) crate small-block engine option.
crossed sticks
Two curled up flags held out in the form of a cross that signal the halfway mark in many American racing series.
curb
A dirt oval cushion (see below) that has formed into a harder dirt ledge with a similar shape to a sidewalk curb. Often, curbs are harder and more treacherous to run across than the softer cushions, and can easily flip improperly approaching cars over.
cushion
In dirt racing, when dirt is kicked up and lands near the edges of the track after cars drift through the corners. The dirt builds up after time and can slow a driver down if they slide too deep into it while drifting through the turn. In dirt oval racing, when dirt is kicked towards the wall, it builds into a short mound that cars will lean on in order to gain speed and momentum.
customer car
A car externally sourced by a racing team, either from another team or from a specialist racing chassis manufacturer. Primarily a Formula One term, where the majority of teams built their own cars; customer cars have since been banned from F1. In some short track late model and modified series, customer cars are standard, while the opposite is the house car, which is the works cars built by a chassis builder.

== D ==
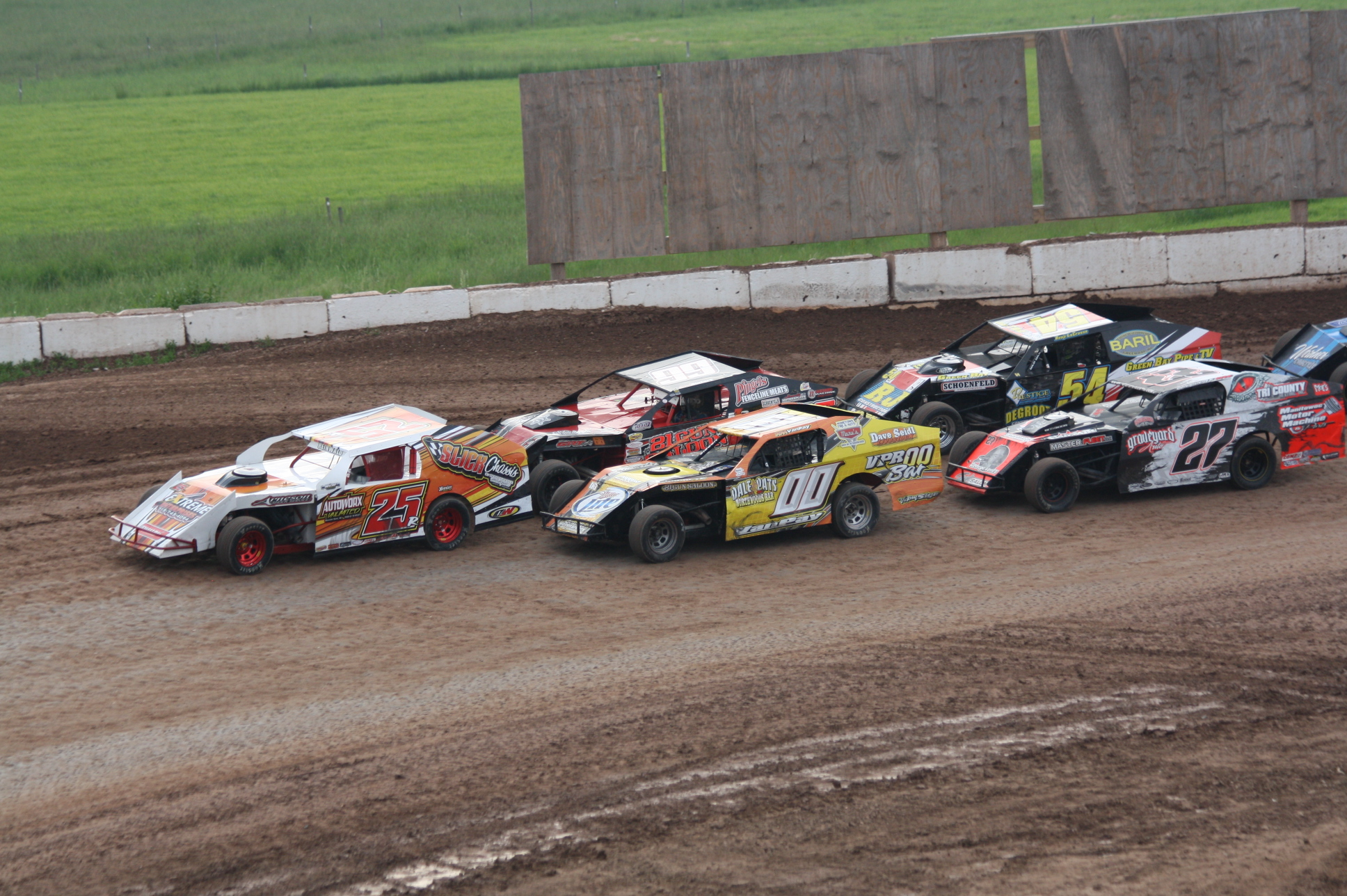
Delaware start

deep braking
Applying the brakes later than normal when entering a turn.
deep staging
In drag racing, when a dragster pulls so far forward that they leave the pre-stage area and turn off the pre-stage lights on the Christmas tree, but not far enough to leave the staged area. This may give the driver a few inches of advantage, and is legal in drag racing.
Delaware start
A style of restart where the race leader starts in the first row by themselves and the other drivers start two-wide. The leader can choose which lane they want for the restart, which can offer a clear advantage over second place.
delta time
The entire time it generally takes a driver to enter the pit lane, make a full pit stop, and exit the pit area to resume racing at optimum pace. Also referred to as the pit-stop delta.
density altitude (DA)
A term in drag racing which often refers to atmospheric air pressure decreasing as altitude above sea level increases. All supercharged internal combustion engines produce less power as air pressure drops, as each intake stroke draws in less air per volume than normally. This may require the engine to be "tuned" to optimize power. Because a supercharger pressurizes intake air at a fixed mechanical ratio to engine speed, the engine suffers a proportionate loss in power, but not as severe as a naturally aspirated engine does. Turbocharged engines are largely unaffected, as the lower density of the intake air is offset by the lower backpressure resisting exhaust flow through the turbo.
dial-in
In bracket racing, drivers must estimate or "dial in" the time in which they expect to run, allowing two unmatched cars in weight and power to compete via a handicap system. If one runs a faster time than is dialed in, it is called a breakout.
did not attend (DNA)
Denotes a driver who was entered for a race but did not attend the circuit. Sometimes referred to as did not arrive or simply a no-show.
did not finish (DNF)
A driver who did not finish the race. Some sanctioning bodies do not classify a driver in the final results if they did not complete a certain number of laps; for example, in Formula One, a driver must complete 90% of the winner's completed laps to be classified as a finisher.
did not qualify / did not pre-qualify (DNQ / DNPQ)
A failure to qualify or pre-qualify for a race, most often because the driver was too slow to make it into a limited number of grid positions, or was slower than the 107% rule.
did not start (DNS)
A driver who attended but did not attempt to compete in a race, even though they may have competed in practice sessions or qualifying.
digger
A non-bodied dragster, as distinct from a funny car or flopper (a drag car with a doorless single-piece body) or other bodied dragster. May also be referred to as a rail (see below).
dirty air
The disrupted air left in a car's wake when it moves at speed, which can cause aerodynamic difficulties for a car following closely behind, such as reduced downforce. The opposite of clean air.
dogleg
A shallow-angle turn or kink on a racing circuit, usually associated with road courses, but also present on oval tracks (an example being Phoenix Raceway). On road courses, a dogleg may be present on a long straightaway, curving the straight slightly, but usually not enough to require drivers to slow down much for the turn. On an oval, a dogleg can be located on the front stretch, creating an oblong shape, adding a challenge, increasing sightlines for fans, and again, usually not requiring drivers to slow down for the extra curve. A quad-oval is also referred to as a "double dogleg". Some tracks classify the dogleg as a numbered turn while others do not
doped / dope
In drag racing, a diesel-powered car using nitrous or propane injection. Commonly used in the southern United States.
door-slammer
A drag racing term used to group vehicles, usually sedans, that still have functional doors for driver access to the vehicle, as opposed to funny cars or floppers (see below), which have a lightweight single-piece body draped over a racing chassis.
double-header / double header
Two consecutive race weekends in a series. An additional event forms a triple-header.
double-stack / double stack
A strategic choice to pit and service both of a team's vehicles on the same lap, one immediately after the other. The term is most commonly used in Formula One, but applies to any series where teams operate more than one vehicle and have a single pit box and team of mechanics.
downforce
Increased grip created by the aerodynamics of a vehicle via an upside-down lift effect. Downforce allows a vehicle to travel faster through corners at the cost of a reduced top speed on straights due to drag.
drafting
A technique where multiple vehicles align end to end, reducing the overall effect of drag due to exploiting the lead vehicle's slipstream. See also slipstreaming.
Drag Reduction System (DRS)
A mechanically activated element of the rear wing of modern Formula One cars, which can be used at specific areas on the circuit. The wing element rotates from steeply inclined to relatively flat, thus reducing the amount of drag generated by the rear wing and increasing top speed. DRS also makes cars less susceptible to dirty air.

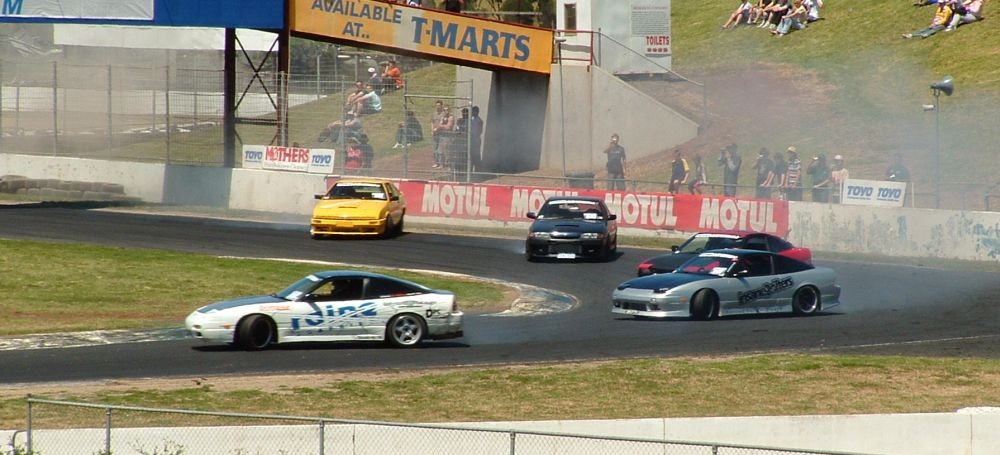
A drift competition

drifting
Drifting is a form of motorsport in which drivers intentionally oversteer their cars while maintaining vehicle control and a high exit speed. In motor racing, the four-wheel drift is a cornering technique where a car takes a high-speed corner held at an angle without major steering inputs, balancing natural understeer with power oversteer.
drive-through penalty
A penalty applied by race officials while the race is underway, where a competitor is directed to drive into the pit lane and travel its length at low speed (pit lanes are speed-limited to protect the pit crew and marshals), losing significant time in the process. When the driver is serving their drive-through penalty, they are not allowed to stop anywhere in the pits. See also stop-go penalty.

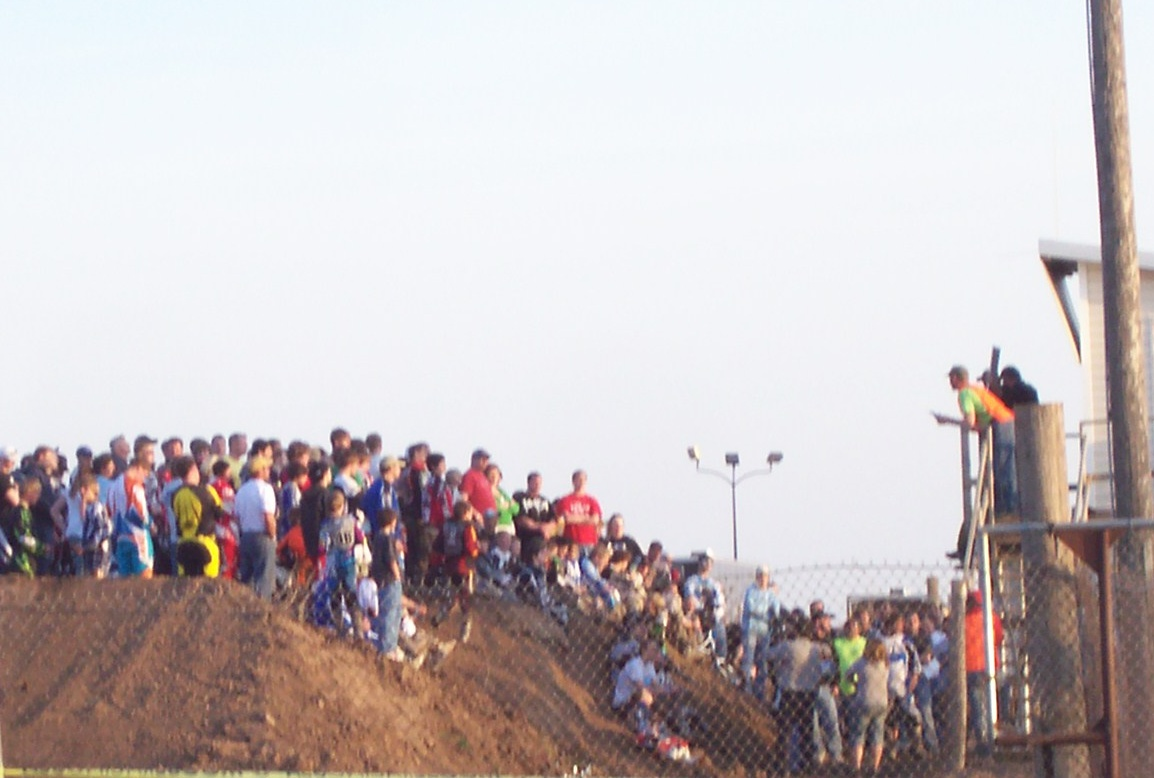
Drivers' meeting before a motocross race

drivers' meeting
A meeting where drivers and officials meet before a race to discuss the upcoming event. Also referred to as a drivers' briefing or driver and crew chief meeting, as in some series, the driver(s) and their crew chief must attend.
dry line
On a drying circuit, the racing line that becomes dry first as the cars displace water from it.
due time
The time that a rally crew is due at the next time control. If the crew arrive on or before their due time, they will incur no time penalty. In practice, because determining a winner depends on being able to sort finishers in order of accrued penalty points (those with the fewest wins), due times are often set to be very difficult if not impossible to attain.

== E ==
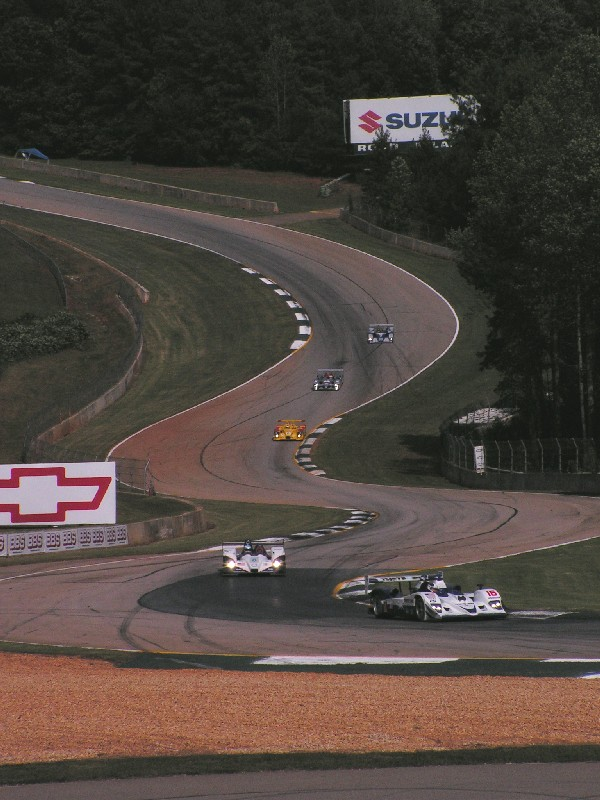
The esses at Road Atlanta

ERS (energy recovery system)
Part of the hybrid powertrain systems used in Formula One since 2014, that recovers energy from the brakes and heat and stores it in batteries, which is then used to boost power. It combines both a kinetic energy recovery system (KERS), known officially as the motor generator unit – kinetic (MGU-K), and a system recovering heat from the turbocharger, officially known as the motor generator unit – heat (MGU-H). Since 2026, the MGU-H is no longer used in Formula One.
esses
A sequence of alternating turns on a road course, resembling the letter S.
E.T. (elapsed time)
In drag racing, the total time a run has taken from start to finish.
E.T. slip
In drag racing, a slip of paper turned in by the race timer which denotes elapsed time for both drivers, and who won the race; it may also include reaction time and 60-foot time. This is an official document used for timekeeping. Also known as a timeslip.
European season
In Formula One, the segment of a regionalised Grand Prix calendar when most European races are held.
excluded (EXC / EXCL)
Removed from competition before the race has started, generally due to an infringement during practice or qualifying.

== F ==
factory-backed
A racing team or driver that competes with official sanction and financial support from a manufacturer. See also works team.
factory team
A more specific version of factory-backed, referring to racing teams run directly from the factory of the vehicle manufacturer.
fan car
The placement of a large fan at the rear of the chassis driven either independently or by the engine with the purpose of creating negative air-pressure underneath the car to create additional downforce for increased cornering speed. Usually refers specifically to the Brabham BT46B Formula One car, although the concept was actually pioneered by the Chaparral 2J.
fastest lap
Fastest time in which a lap was completed by a driver during a race. Sometimes rewarded with bonus championship points.
feeder series
A lower level in a racing category that supports young talent feeding into the higher level e.g. FIA Formula 2 to Formula One.
field
The competing cars in an event.
field-filler
A driver or team usually slower than the majority of the field that only participates if there are open spots. See also start and park.
first or worse
In drag racing, if both drivers commit a foul, the driver who commits a foul first loses, unless it is either a foul start (where the driver leaving earlier to their green light is charged, such as a -.002 foul start to a -.003 foul start, the driver who commits a -.003 foul is charged, and -.002 is given the green light), or two separate fouls, where the loser is the driver who committed the worse foul.
flag-to-flag coverage
Television or radio coverage that consists of the entire race start-to-finish rather than highlights, tape delayed, "packaged" coverage, or highlights of the first portion of the race before broadcasting the final portion of the race live. Derives from green flag (start) to checkered flag (finish). Instituted largely in the late 1970s, with the 1979 Daytona 500 being the first major 500-mile race with live, flag-to-flag coverage.
flying lap
A lap, usually in qualifying, started by a competitor at optimum speed, as opposed to a lap from a standing start.
flying start
See rolling start.
formation lap
The lap cars make before forming up on the grid for the start.
formula racing
A type of racing, generally open-wheeled, where the conditions of technical entry comply with strict rules or formulae.
free practice
When drivers or riders learn the circuit and teams experiment with race settings for the track.
front-row start
Qualifying and starting on front-row of the grid. This is generally either the top-two or top-three qualifying positions. Term is typically not used for drivers starting on pole position.
fuel cell
A fuel tank with a flexible inner liner to minimize the potential for punctures in the event of a collision or other mishap resulting in serious damage to the vehicle. Mandatory in most forms of motorsport.
fueler
In drag racing, any car running specialized fuel or in a "fuel" class (most often, Top Fuel Dragsters or Top Fuel Funny Cars).
full-course yellow
When yellow flags are deployed at every flag point around a race circuit and a safety car (see below) leads the field until a hazard is cleared.

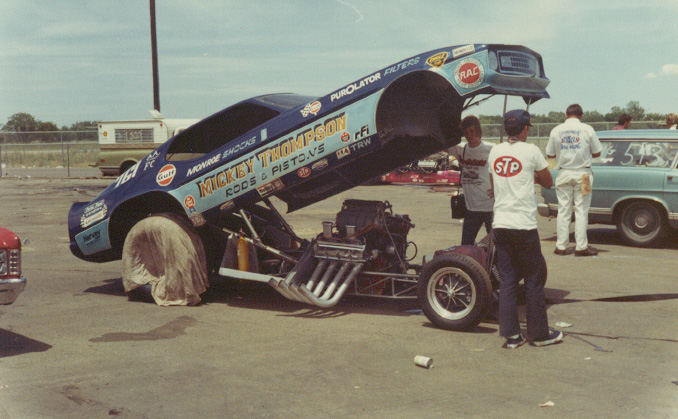
Funny car

funny car
In drag racing, a vehicle with a single-piece body on the chassis, which is lifted off or rear-hinged to allow the driver access to the cabin, or a race class for such cars. May also be referred to as a flopper.

== G ==
gap
In drag racing, beating an opponent in a heads-up drag race with a visible distance between the two competitors. Outside of drag racing, the time difference between two drivers.
garagiste / garagista
A disparaging term used by Enzo Ferrari to describe the new wave of British racing cars (such as Cooper and Lotus) challenging his team with a smaller budget.
gasser
A bodied drag car running on gasoline, from before the pro stock class was introduced.
gentleman driver
In sports car racing, typically refers to a driver who is not a professional racing driver.
graining
When small grains of rubber start coming off a tyre. See also marbles.
grand chelem / grand slam
To qualify on pole, set the fastest lap, win, and lead every lap of a race.
grand marshal
Ceremonial marshalling role at a race meeting. Largely held by celebrities or retired notable drivers, with no actual duties or responsibilities beyond the waving of a flag to commence activity or to announce the traditional "start your engines" prior to some races.
gravel trap
Track run-off area usually positioned on the outside of corners and filled with gravel, intended to slow down and stop cars that have left the track at speed. Generally, there are tyre barriers between a gravel trap and the catch fencing, in order to protect spectators. Sometimes nicknamed "kitty litter" for its visual resemblance.
green track
A paved race course that is clean from rubber buildup, oil and grease, marbles, and debris, typically cleansed by means of a recent rain shower. Depending on the track and/or racing series, a green track may be favorable or unfavorable. Track crews may use jet blowers to remove marbles and debris from the surface and mimic favorable green track conditions. However, a green track may be unfavorable due to reduced traction.
green-white-checker finish
When a full-course caution occurs right before the end of a race, the race is extended beyond its scheduled distance. Depending on the sanctioning body, there may be either one or multiple attempts at a restart, between one and five laps, before the race is declared officially over. NASCAR's national series will have a maximum of three attempts if only the penultimate lap is under caution, while some short track races have unlimited attempts at a span between one and five consecutive green-flag laps. In British Superbike Championship motorcycle racing, if a caution is called in the final third of the race, three additional laps will be added on the ensuing restart in a green-white-checker style finish.
grenade
To wreck an engine so violently that internal parts of the engine break through the block and/or bolted-on parts (cylinder heads, oil pan, etc.), blowing up the engine. Distinct from popping the blower. Hand grenade engine is a usually derogatory term for an engine tuned to maximise engine power at the cost of low mechanical reliability, or an engine design that is known for failing on a regular basis.
grid / starting grid
The starting formation of a race, generally in rows of two for cars and three or four for bikes. The Indianapolis 500 traditionally has a unique grid of three cars per row. The grid can also refer to the group of teams and drivers competing in a series.
grid penalty / grid drop
A sporting penalty, where the driver is demoted grid positions after qualifying.
grip
The maximum friction force achievable between tire and road without slipping. It is shown by a car's maximum acceleration on a performance envelope known as a G-G diagram. The maximum acceleration varies between straight-ahead and sideways motion and in every direction in-between. It depends on tire design and the car weight which is reduced by aerodynamic lift (production cars) or increased by aerodynamic downforce (race cars).:

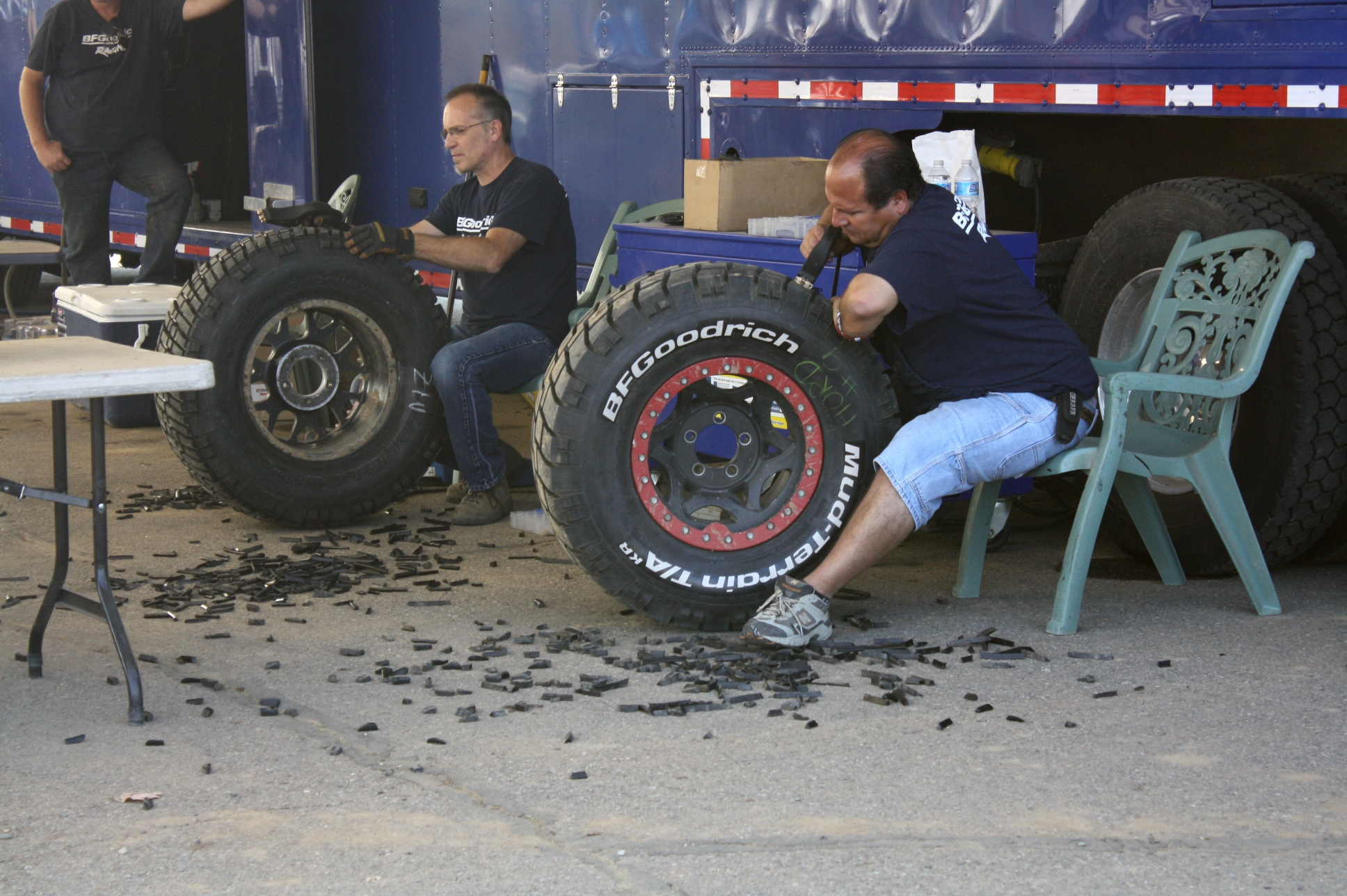
Crew members grooving tires

groove
The optimal path around the track for the lowest lap time. In drag racing, it refers to the center portion of the lane, where cars can gain traction quicker.
grooving
The process of cutting grooves into a tire to adjust traction.
ground effect
A method of creating downforce using the shape of a car's body, notably by shaping the underbody to speed up airflow between it and the ground and effectively turn the entire car into an airfoil.
guest driver
A driver who competes part-time in a series and is not classified in the final standings.
Gurney flap / Gurney
A small lip placed at the trailing edge of a race car's wing. Despite its relative size, often only millimetres tall, it can double the downforce achieved by the wing, although at the premium of increasing drag, hence the small size. Named for the man commonly attributed to its proliferation, Formula One driver and constructor Dan Gurney. Also known as a wickerbill.
gymkhana
A form of motorsport which consists largely of an obstacle course of tight turns, spins and reversing. The winner is the one who completes all prescribed manoeuvrers in the shortest possible time. The course is usually marked out with traffic cones or similar devices, and hitting them with the car usually acquires a time penalty. Also known as autotesting or motorkhana.

== H ==
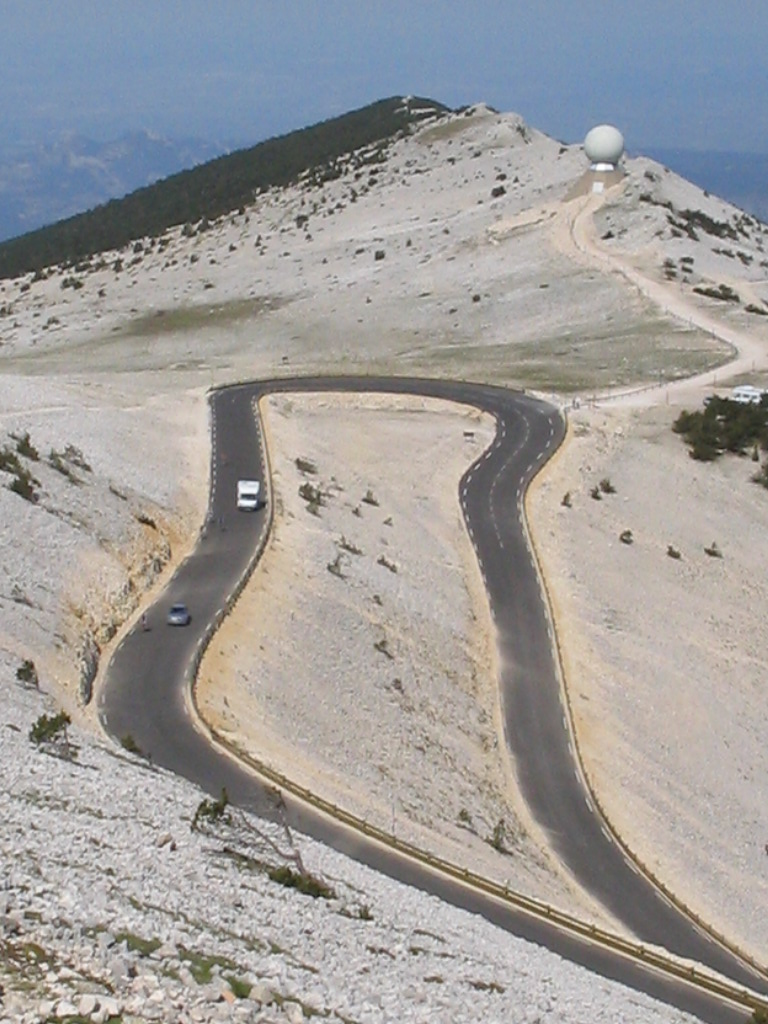
Hairpin turn on the Mont Ventoux in France

halo
A driver crash protection structure used in open-wheel racing series, which consists of a curved bar around the driver's head.
hairpin
A tight, approximately 180-degree corner that twists back on itself.
handicap
Where cars start a race in the reverse order of qualifying, or perceived race pace, usually with timed gaps between cars starting a race. More common in racing's early days than today, the effect was to produce a race result in which all cars would arrive at the race finish together, regardless of the performance of the race vehicle. Another form of handicapping is success ballast, where more successful cars are assessed a weight penalty for every win, and balance of power in sportscar racing.
Handford device
A vertical spoiler piece attached across the back of the rear wing that pushes air down, increasing drag and creating a larger slipstream for the car behind. Used in the CART FedEx series to slow cars down and improve passing on superspeedways.
HANS (head and neck support) device
A safety item compulsory in many auto racing series. It reduces the likelihood of head and/or neck injuries, such as a basilar skull fracture, in the event of a crash.
heads-up racing
In drag racing, where both drivers leave at the same time; used in all professional classes.
heat
A shorter preliminary race which decides the participants of the main race, and sometimes starting order as well. Usually, there are more heats in which only a segment of drivers from the entry list take part. Can also refer to a part of the main race, when it consists of two or more parts.
heavy
Opposite of slick - used to describe a dirt-oval trackstate in which the surface is wet and fast.
Happy hour
The last practice session before a NASCAR Cup Series race. The term is also used at Indianapolis, specifically for the final hour of an individual practice day (or a qualifying day). So named because of the lower ambient and track temperatures; late in the day, the tall double-deck grandstands at the Indianapolis Motor Speedway tend to cast large shadows over the track, cooling the asphalt surface, which typically results in faster lap speeds.
holeshot
In motorcycle, off-road, and powerboat racing, the driver or rider who is first through the first turn at the start of a race, following a standing start. In drag racing, getting a starting line advantage due to a quicker reaction time. The other driver gets "holeshotted", "welded to the line", or "left at the tree." A "holeshot win" is any win in a heads-up class where a car wins because of better reaction time, despite having a slower elapsed time.
homologation
The process by which a new vehicle or part of a vehicle is approved by organizers for usage in racing. It also refers to the majority of the world's road racing sanctioning bodies having a racing class following the FIA's Group GT3 formula. This was done to allow a car to be raced in multiple series with no changes.
hook-up / hooking up
In drag racing, good traction between the tires and the track, resulting in increased acceleration and reduced wheelspin.
hot lap
See flying lap.
hot laps
A series of practice laps, common on oval tracks, before heat races. Used to help drivers with their cars and improve the track's condition before racing.
house car
A chassis manufacturer's research and development car.
hydrolocking
Excessive fuel entering ("flooding") one or more cylinders due to abnormal operating conditions. Being liquid, the fuel cannot be compressed, causing damage to the motor and possibly grenading it. Most common in drag racing. May also happen if a motor ingests water through the air intake.

== I ==
IHRA
An acronym referring to the International Hot Rod Association.
impound rule
General term for parc fermé, used at certain tracks where teams are not allowed to work on cars between qualifying and the beginning of the race. See also Impound race (NASCAR) and parc fermé.
in-lap
Any lap which concludes with a visit to the pits, especially a pre-arranged pit stop, either during a race or during practice or qualifying. Often drivers push hard to drive fast on their in-lap (despite perhaps having worn out tires) in order to gain time lost during the pit stop. See also delta time.
incident officer (IO or I/O)
A marshal who is in charge of other marshals on the track, allocating duties to them. Second in rank to observer. In hillclimb events, they are responsible for radio communication.
independent
A competitor (team or driver) taking part with very little backing from a manufacturer or none at all. They have their own championship within the World Touring Car Championship, where there is a strong manufacturer presence.
inspector
See scrutineer.
installation lap
A lap which can take place in practice or qualifying, intended simply to gain data and telemetry for the driver or team, rather than setting a competitive time. Installation laps are sometimes specifically scheduled by the officials (usually on the first day of an open test or first overall practice session) for all cars to perform leak checks and general system checks, and often mandate that they are conducted at a reduced pace.
intermediate
A tire with lighter grooving than a wet weather tire (see below). Sometimes an intermediate is a slick tyre with grooves cut into it. It is used for conditions between fully dry and fully wet, most often when the track is wet but it is not actually raining.
International season
In Australia and New Zealand midget and sprint car racing, the time generally between December and February. Because of Australia being in the Southern Hemisphere, some drivers in North America will fly down to Australia during the time and participate in various meetings before the major series have Florida-based meetings in February. The recognised International Season typically runs from Christmas Day (because of the time difference, it usually is Christmas night in the United States where the international drivers are based, when the Boxing Day races start), until the week before the Florida meetings. The most notable races on the international season there include Australian Speedweek at various Australian tracks starting on Boxing Day and the Grand Annual Sprintcar Classic in January.
invert
The portion of the field which becomes ordered by reverse qualifying speed. With an invert of five, for example, the fifth-fastest qualifier starts first and the fastest qualifier starts fifth. The rest of the field starts by their qualifying speed (sixth-fastest starts sixth). The invert is often not announced before qualifying, or a die roll happens after qualifying.

== J ==
James Bond (red)
When a driver's reaction time is .007 seconds. A James Bond red is -.007 seconds (a red light foul), resulting in a loss unless the opponent commits a worse foul.

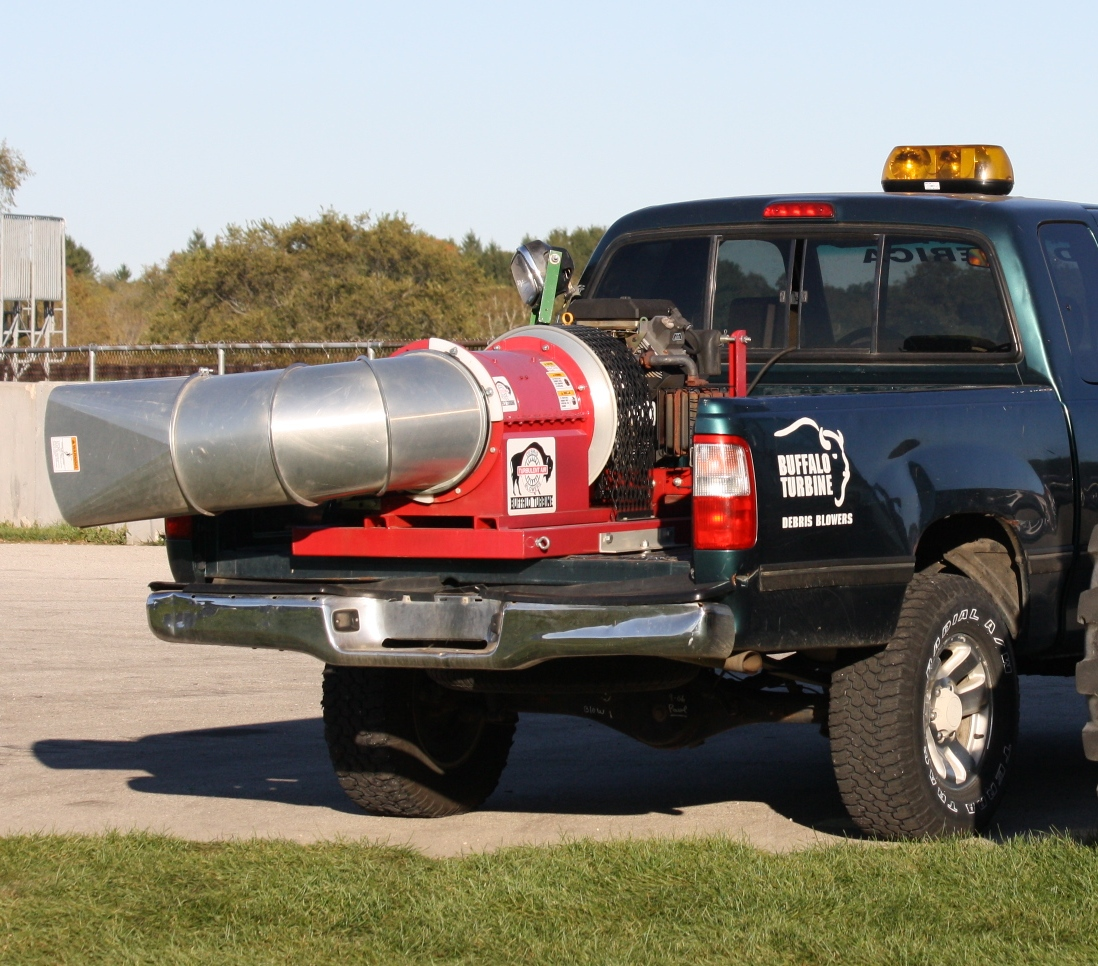
Jet dryer mounted on a pickup truck

jet dryer
A helicopter turbine engine or small airplane jet engine mounted on a pickup truck or trailer. The exhaust from the engine is used to blow debris or evaporate moisture from the racing surface.
joker lap
In rallycross events, each vehicle must run a lap with a detour once during each single race. In events overseen by the FIA, such as the FIA World Rallycross Championship, this joker lap must be at least two seconds slower; therefore, the alternative route makes the lap longer. In the American Global Rallycross series, the joker lap is usually a bit shorter than a lap on the original track. The joker lap was thought up as a tactical component by Svend Hansen, the father of 14-times FIA European Rallycross champion Kenneth Hansen, to increase the competition.
jump start
In a standing start, when a vehicle moves from its grid slot before the start of a race is signaled. In a rolling start, when a car passes before they cross the start-finish line or the restart line. When this is done, a penalty is usually imposed. In drag racing, a jump start is signalled by a red light in the offending driver's lane, and they lose unless a more serious foul (boundary line or failure to report to post-race inspection after a round win) occurs.

== K ==
KERS (kinetic energy recovery system)
A device which recovers energy when brakes are applied and stores it until required to add power. In 2008 KERS systems started to appear in the World Rally Championship. Formula One followed soon after; its application is limited to a push to pass system.
kit
In drag racing, refers to a turbo kit or a nitrous kit. Using nitrous oxide in professional drag racing categories is illegal.
kitty litter
Informal term with two possible meanings. It is either a nickname for a gravel trap, or for a material applied to the track surface to clean up a fluid leakage or spill.

== L ==
Early apex Ideal line Late apex

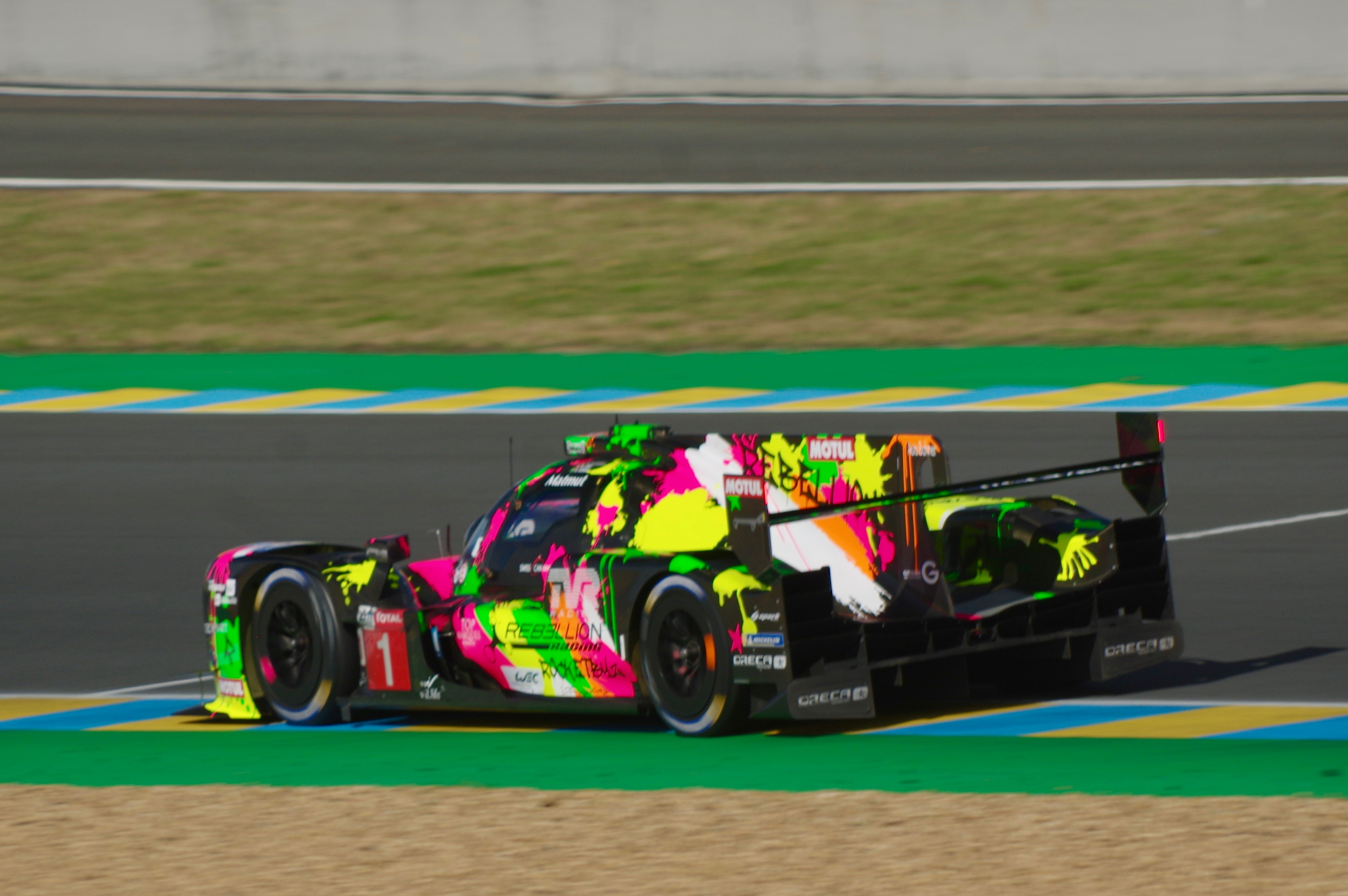
A unique livery used by Rebellion Racing

ladder series
Generally refers to a category or series of lesser importance which, in most cases, will race at the same race meeting as a senior category. Cars will be generally characteristically similar to drive but will be smaller, less powerful, and/or slower. Competitors will generally be younger emerging drivers, who are climbing an apprenticeship "ladder" towards entry into the senior series.
lambda reading
Fuel to air ratio readings, used to determine how much fuel is pushed through the fuel injectors into the cylinders for combustion.
lap
A whole circuit of a racing track.
lap of honour
A non-competitive lap taken before or after the race by a driver in celebration. Also known as a victory lap (see below).
lap record
Fastest race lap recorded at a circuit for a category of race car. The circumstances allowed vary significantly, but practice laps are generally not considered official records. Laps recorded in qualifying may or may not contribute but are sometimes referred together with practice laps as qualifying lap records. The outright lap record is the fastest race lap ever recorded at any particular circuit, regardless of category of vehicle being raced.
Le Mans car
A phrase used by the general public to describe a sports prototype racing car, commonly a Le Mans Prototype or its predecessors and successors (including Group C, Group 6, Group 5, LMH, and LMDh), regardless of whether it is competing at Le Mans or not.
lead trophy
See success ballast
leg
In rallying, a leg is usually each day of the event. A leg can be further broken up into sections, and loops consist of repeated sections.
legality panel
a piece of bodywork of a racing car which is required by the technical regulations that does not have a function essential to the car's function.
lights-to-flag victory
A driver winning from pole position, having led every lap of the race.
livery
The paint and/or decals applied to a vehicle to mark its sponsorship or team identity.
lock-up
Tyre skidding under braking.
lollipop
A sign on a stick used in pit stops, which is held in front of the car and raised when the pit stop is completed. Though the same basic device is utilized in NASCAR and IndyCar, generic terms such as pit board or sign board are preferred as the sign is not round, but sometimes square, and often is in a specific design unique to the driver or team. In addition, in NASCAR and IndyCar, the sign is usually only used for the driver to locate their pit box, and is pulled back (not normally being used to signal departure as it is in Formula One).
long lap
The long lap penalty was introduced to motorcycle racing in 2019 and involves a rider taking a detour on a pre-designated route, usually an extended corner. This is intended to increase a rider's lap time as a penalty for an infringement during a race, and is intended as a lighter penalty than a ride-through penalty (see drive-through penalty above).
loose
See oversteer

== M ==
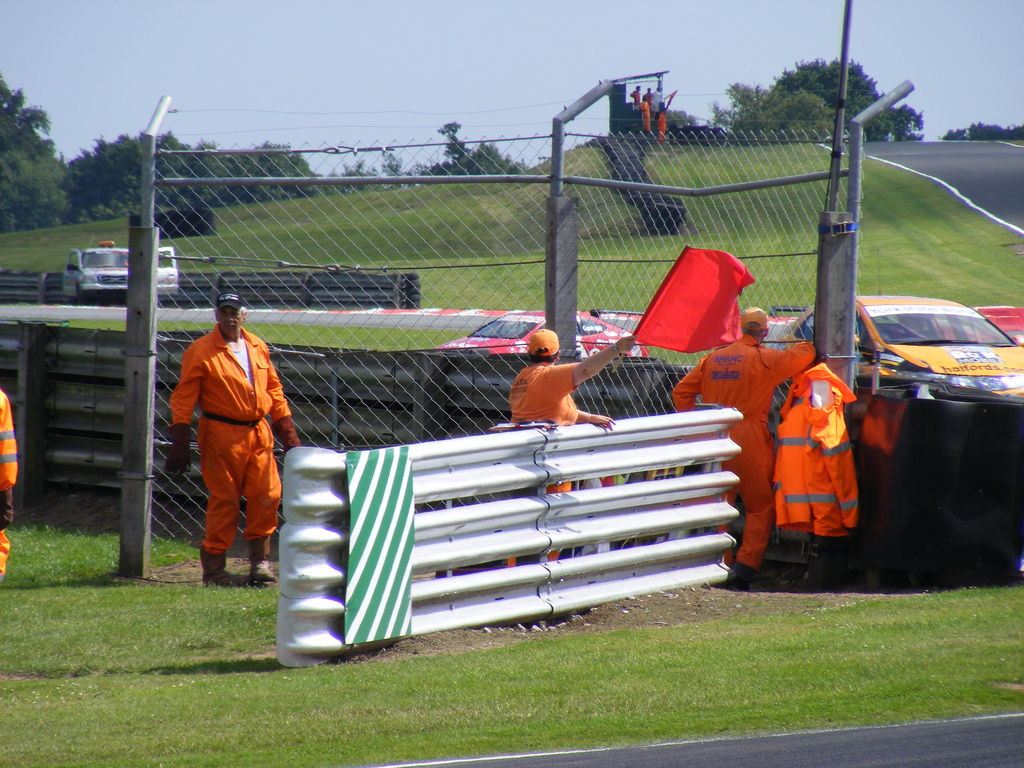
A marshal waving a red flag

marbles
Pieces of rubber from tires that accumulate on the racing surface outside of the racing line, that are slippery like toy marbles.
marshal
A person responsible for signaling track conditions to drivers (through use of flags), extinguishing fires, removing damaged cars from the track, and sometimes providing emergency first aid.
meatball
A specific racing flag used in some countries to indicate to a driver that there is a defect with their car that carries a safety risk to them or to another driver. Most usually applied to trailing smoke or loose bodywork. The flag is black with a large orange dot in the centre of the flag, looking vaguely like a meatball. Some racing series use this flag to indicate the car being flagged is no longer being scored, due to ignoring orders to pit because of a rules infraction.
Mickey Mouse corner
A pejorative term for a corner or series of corners on a circuit that are thought to be poorly designed, slow, uncompetitive, uninteresting, and usually difficult or near impossible to overtake through, which detract from the overall challenge of the course. In some cases where the entire course is deemed poorly designed, it can be referred to as a "Mickey Mouse track".
midfield
The middle of the racing order, usually referring to teams who are not front-runners nor backmarkers.
mill
Any internal combustion engine used in a race car (inherited from hot rodding slang).
missing man formation
The driver in pole position drops back a row during a pace lap (leaving the front row empty) to salute a deceased motorsport personality.
mobile chicane
Disparaging slang for a competitor noticeably slower than the front-running pace.
motorkhana
See gymkhana.
Motorsport Valley
A tag given to the mid-south of England by the Motorsport Industry Association, where a high concentration of activities within the motorsport industry occur.
mountain motor
A mainly North American term for large-displacement engines, often used in hot rods and drag racers. Named for their size (around 500 cubic inches (8.2 L), the limit in some sanctioning bodies), and for sometimes being constructed in the mountains of Tennessee and North Carolina.
Murrayism
A humorous term or phrase originally uttered during a broadcast, by and named in honour of veteran Formula One broadcaster, Murray Walker.
mystery caution
An unknown condition caution in the closing laps of a race.

== N ==
NASCAR
Acronym for National Association of Stock Car Auto Racing.
navigator
See co-driver.
nationals
Most NHRA events are called nationals, referring to the first nationwide NHRA drag race held at the Great Bend Municipal Airport in Kansas, called simply "the Nationals".
net leader / effective leader
A driver who is set to assume the race lead once the drivers ahead have completed their pit stops.
NHRA
Acronym for National Hot Rod Association, one of two sanctioning bodies in drag racing located within the United States.
nitrous
In drag racing, refers to the use of a nitrous oxide system to boost power.
non-championship
A race which does not form an official leg of the championship or series hosting the event, without points contributing to the final standings.
not classified (NC)
A driver who was racing at the end of the race, but did not complete the required distance to be classified.
no-tow lap
A lap driven without the assistance of aerodynamic drafting. During practice or testing, "no-tow" data can be used to provide more accurate simulations of single-car qualifying.

== O ==
observer
The highest ranking trackside marshal within the post and the main decision-maker at the event of an incident, who relays information to race control. Can be seen standing in the marshal post. Second to chief marshal.
official
See steward
oildown
In drag racing, when a car's engine or lubrication system breaks during a run, leaving a streak of oil and/or other fluids on the track. This is punishable by fines, point penalties, and/or suspension.
open-wheel car
A specific type of racing car whose wheels are not enclosed by bodywork, e.g. Formula One.

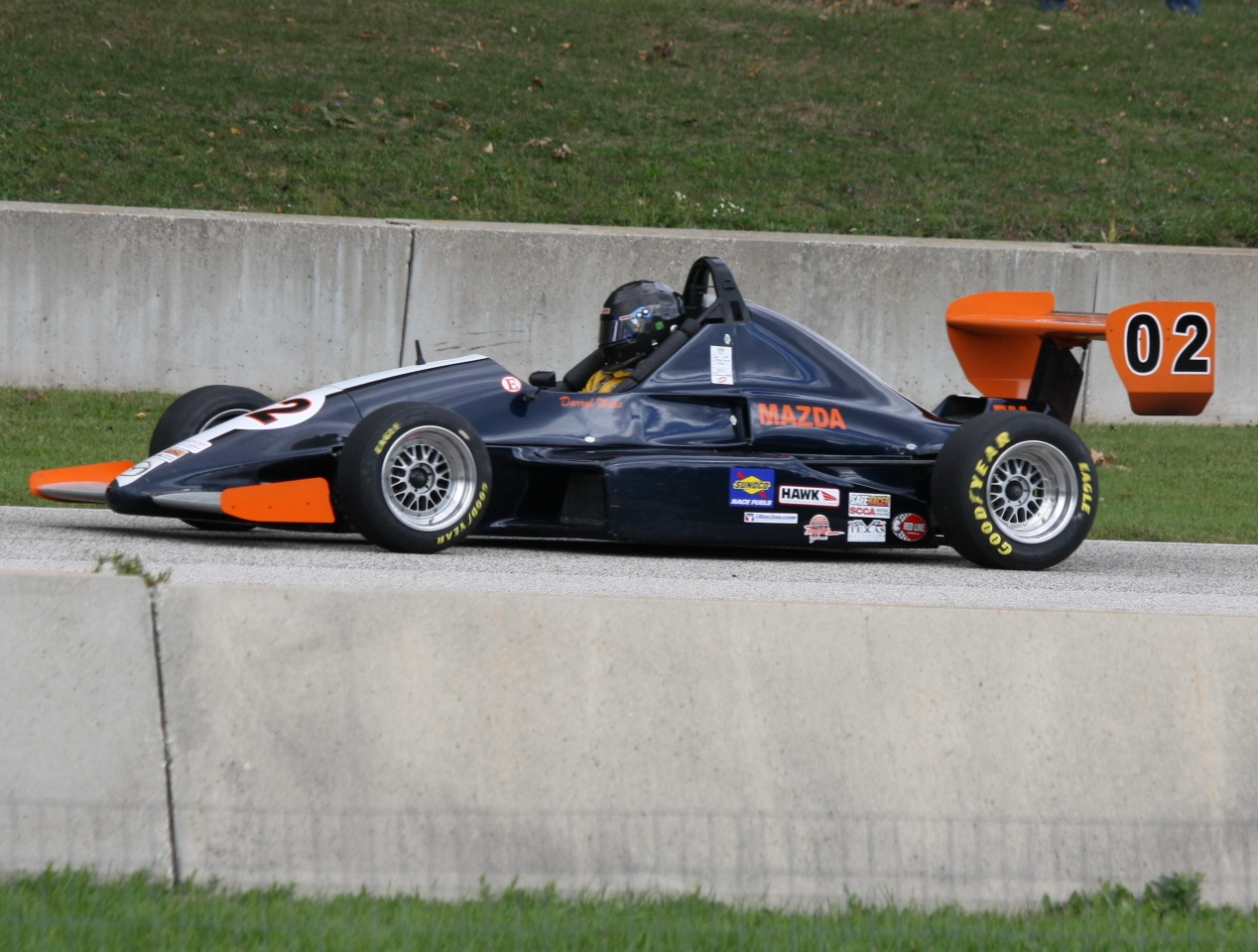
Formula Mazda, a one-make series

one-make racing
Racing equipment that must be identical for all competitors, usually to cut down on costs or for business purposes by car manufacturers. Known in North America as spec, specific parts can be spec, as in the IndyCar Series' spec engine, or the entire car can be spec, as in spec racing series such as Spec Miata.
option tires
The softer tire compound available, generally faster and less durable than prime tires.
out-brake
To gain time or position by braking harder and deeper in a corner.
out lap
The first lap to be completed after exiting the pit lane, either during a race or during practice or qualifying.
outright lap record
Fastest lap recorded at a circuit of any category of race car. Most often, this does not include qualifying and practice laps, but confusingly, some sources occasionally include laps not recorded during races.
overcut
Delaying a pit stop to gain time on competitors. Rarely seen in modern Formula One, but usable there when fresh tyres are not at the best operating temperature and take time to warm up. The opposite of an undercut.
oversteer
Cornering behaviour where the rear wheels do not track behind the front wheels, but instead move out toward the outside of the turn. The opposite of understeer.
owner–driver
A form of racing where the driver/team own the vehicle they are competing with. Particularly prevalent in kart racing.

== P ==
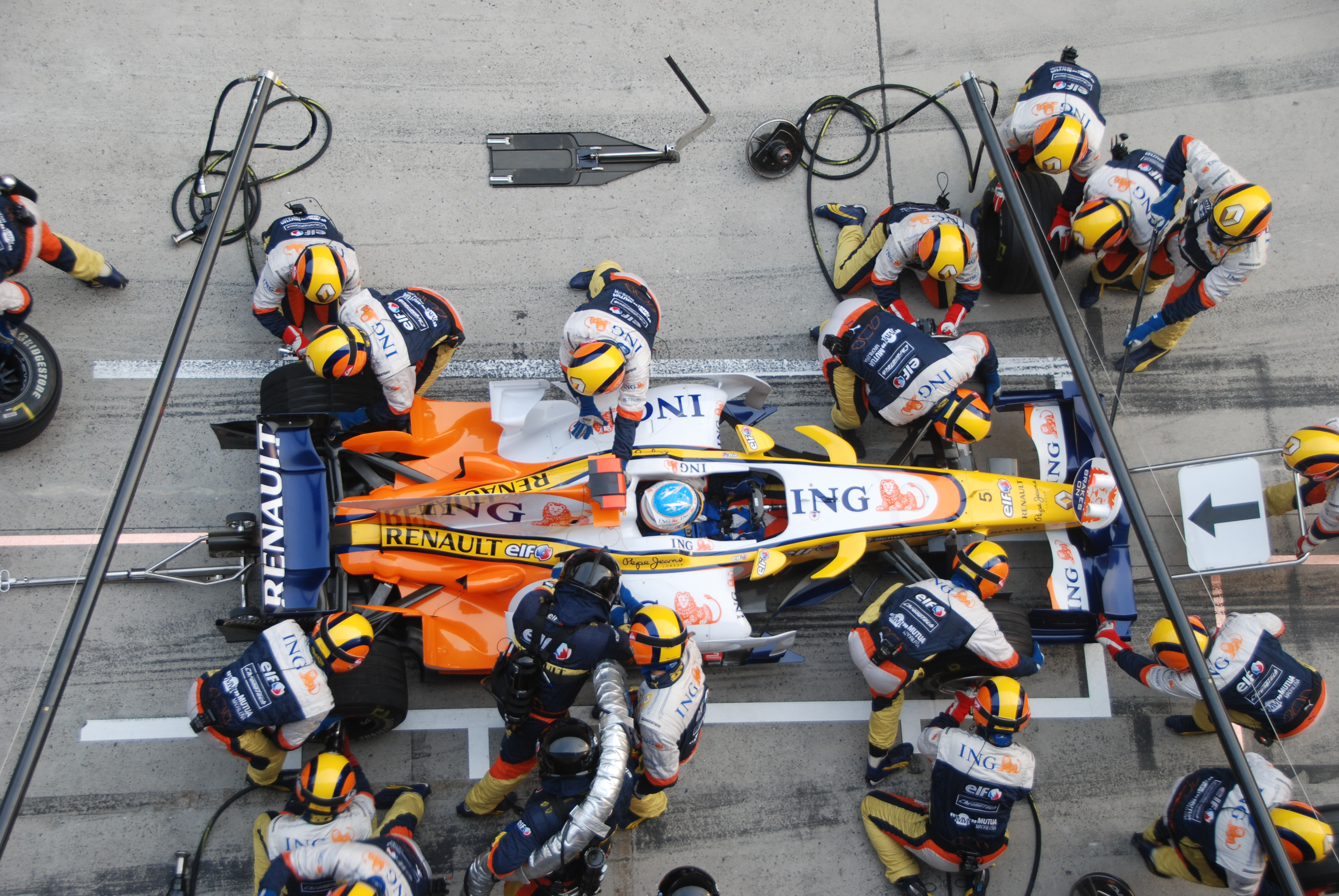
A pit stop in Formula One

pace car
See safety car. This term is rarely used outside North America.
pacenotes
In rallying, notes that describe the course in detail.
paddock
An enclosure at a track used by team support personnel and vehicles, and other officials and VIPs.
paint scheme
See livery.
parade lap
A lap before a motorsport race begins, where the drivers go around the track at a slow speed, also known as a formation lap.
parc fermé
An area which cars enter after they have qualified for the race, where they are not allowed to be worked upon by mechanics unless under strict supervision by the stewards. Some motorsports series other than Formula One refer to this as the impound.
pay driver
A driver who pays for their race seat rather than receiving a salary from the team. Generally has a negative connotation. Sometimes known as a ride buyer.
pedalling
In drag racing, working the throttle to avoid wheelspin or as a way to sandbag.
photo finish
A finish in which two or more cars are so close that in times past, a photograph of the finishers crossing the finish line would need to be studied to determine the finishing order. While the practice has been mostly superseded by modern electronic timing systems, the location of the transponder in a vehicle is not located near the nose of the vehicle, so stewards often use video replays to detect where the nose (of a car) or wheel (of a motorcycle) crosses the finish line first.
Posse
In sprint car racing, when Pennsylvania-based teams race against the national touring series in Central Pennsylvania, the local teams (with drivers who are not regulars on a national tour) are often called the Pennsylvania Posse. The "Posse vs Outlaws" rivalry is one of the biggest sprint car racing. High Limit Racing has called the local Perth Motorplex drivers as the "Perth Posse" (for Western Australia teams) when racing against the High Rollers in their December races, inspired by the term (and on occasion, an Australian driver races with a Pennsylvania Posse team in the off-season).
pill draw
A type of qualifying most common in oval racing, where drivers are assigned a number from 1 to 100. Subsequent races are lined up with the lowest pill-drawer of the field in the front and the highest at the back. In some series, a "pill draw" is used to determine qualifying order.
pit board
A board that is held up from the pit wall to the side of the finishing straight when a driver goes past, to confirm their position in the race and the number of laps remaining. Before the introduction of radio communication, pit boards were also used to instruct drivers to pit for fuel and/or tires, or to comply with rules violations.
pit lane
A lane, adjacent to the race track, where the garages are located.
pit stop
Stopping in the pit lane for repairs, refuelling, and/or new tires.
pit wall
Where the team owners and managers sit to observe the race, opposite the garages in the pit lane.
pit window
During a race, the range of laps in which a pit stop is optimal, due to relative tyre degradation and/or fuel consumption.
pole position
The first grid position, placed closest to the starting line (in Formula One), nearest the inside of the first turn, or both. Usually reserved for the competitor who has recorded the fastest lap during qualifying. A competitor who starts a race there is said to be on the pole.
Polish victory lap
A victory lap run by a winner in the reverse direction.
pre-qualifying
A preliminary qualifying session held prior to a regular qualifying session in order to reduce the number of competitors taking part in the regular session, usually for safety reasons. An example of pre-qualifying is in Formula One in the late 1980s and early 1990s.
prime tires
The harder tire compound available, generally slower and more durable than option tires.
privateer
A competitor not directly supported by a sponsor or manufacturer, being privately funded instead.
progressive grid
Where a category races multiple times at a meeting, the starting order for the grid is decided by the finishing order of the previous race.
pro tree
In drag racing, timing lights which flash all three yellow lights simultaneously, and turn green after four tenths of a second.
prototype
A purpose-built sports racing car that does not noticeably resemble a standard production car.

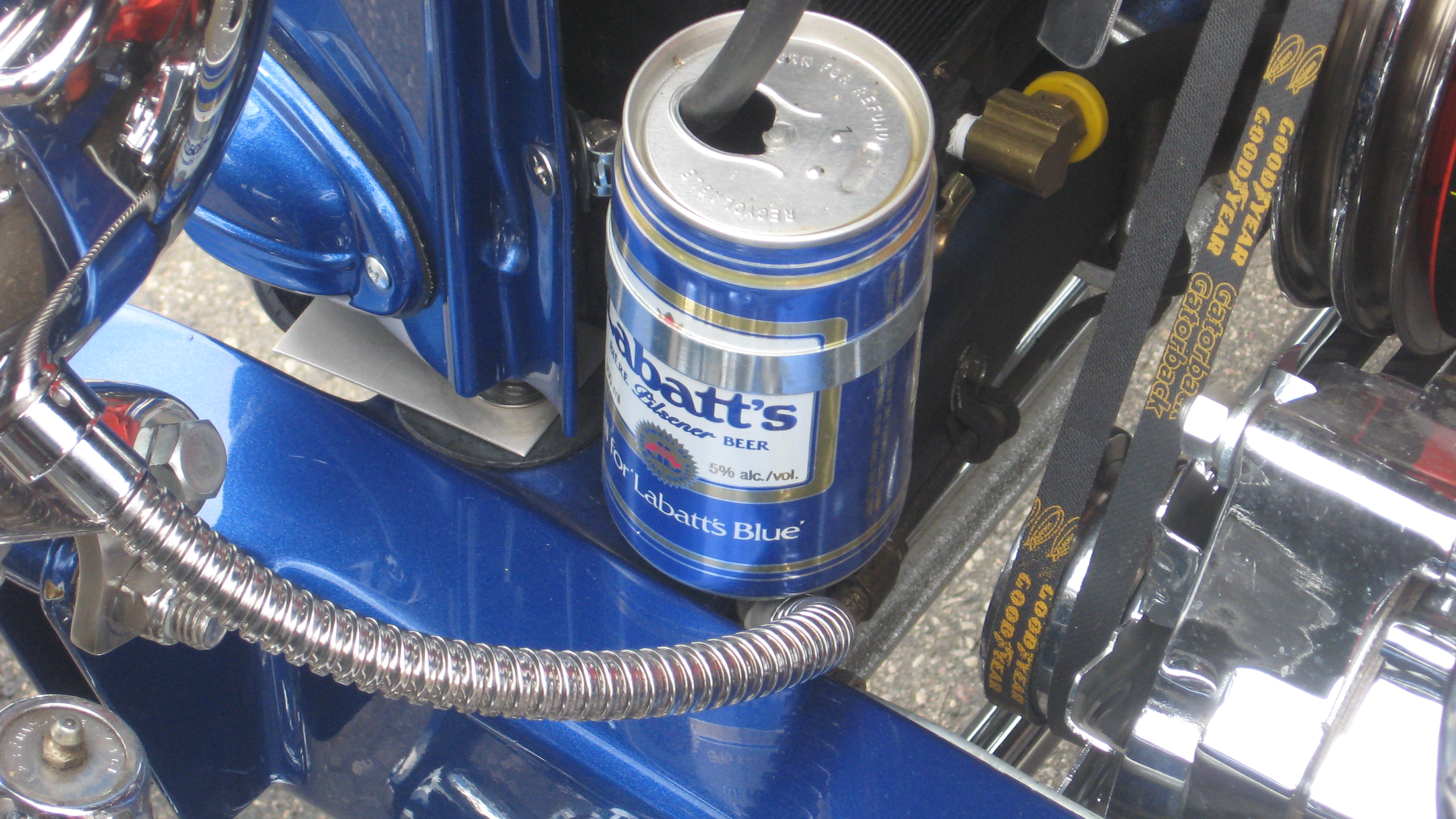
A makeshift puke can. Though some form of puke can is mandatory, this type is illegal at some tracks.

puke can
In drag racing, a radiator overflow tank. Sometimes, used beer cans are used as puke cans, although these types of modifications are sometimes considered illegal. A standard puke can is usually made of plastic and attached close to the radiator.
purple sector
The fastest time of the session in a given sector of the circuit.
push
See understeer.
push to pass
A system in which engine power is increased for short periods to create a short burst of extra speed. This can be done by increasing the boost pressure in a turbocharged car, increasing the maximum rpm, or using a separate (i.e. hybrid) system to provide power. Also see KERS.

== Q ==
qualifying
The process of deciding the starting order of a race. See also pre-qualifying.

quick 8 (Q8)

In drag racing, the quickest eight cars in a defined race. Rules can differ per location or race.

== R ==
R.T.
Abbreviation for reaction time. In drag racing, it refers to the time it takes for a driver to leave the starting line after the green light. This time can mean the difference between a win and loss, especially in closely matched races.
race director
An official appointed by an event organiser who holds ultimate authority over race operations throughout the event. The race director is the senior official present, and controls the activities of the local clerk of the course and marshals and the other staff appointed by the event. When appointed, they hold the responsibility of deploying the safety car and starting and stopping sessions.
race of attrition
A race with a high retirement rate.
racing incident
A collision or incident between drivers during a race where fault is not entirely on one side.
racing line
The fastest, most optimal path around a circuit.
rail / rail job
A dragster (as distinct from a bodied car). The term is derived from the exposed frame rails of early cars, and as such usually refers to early short-wheelbase cars. May also be referred to as a digger.
ramp run
In a practice lap, to rev the engine as far as possible without changing gears, to allow engine management systems to take lambda readings of the fuel to air ratio across a smooth engine speed range.
reactive suspension
A system by which the suspension is controlled by a computer to maintain an optimum distance above the racing surface, regardless of forces acting upon the car and changes in the racing surface, thus maximising the aerodynamic assistance that can be gained by running the car closer to the ground. Originally used by Lotus and later by Williams.
reconnaissance / recce
A pre-race session in rallying where drivers and co-drivers drive on the course at low speed to write down pacenotes. Also known as pre-run in North American off-road racing.
reconnaissance lap
A circuit lap before forming up on the grid for the pre-race.
relief driver
A driver who fills in for another driver in case of injury, or during a race because of exhaustion or pain.
restart
When a race is started again after a caution or other condition that stopped the race. In the case of a restart from a caution period on an oval track and most road courses, this is accomplished by the safety car pulling off the track, the green flag/light being displayed, and cars simply accelerating back to race speeds.
reverse grid racing
When the starting order of a race is reversed, so that the driver in pole position starts last. Occasionally reverse grid is limited to only part of the grid; for example, just the top ten positions may be reversed. Often used to increase the entertainment value of a race, and mainly used when a category races several times over the course of a meeting. In midget and sprint car racing, heat races may be run as reverse grid races with a points system that gives points for cars passed as well as finishing points. At the end of the heat races, the combined total of passing and finishing points are used to determine the starting grid for the A main, and which drivers are sent to lower events.
riding mechanic
A mechanic that rode along with a race car during races, and who was tasked with maintaining, monitoring, and repairing the car during the race.
right-rear
A verb commonly used in sprint car and midget car racing to describe the action of one car hitting another car with their right-rear tire, an action that often ends in disaster for the car being hit.
rim blanking
See wheel shroud.
ripple strip
A kerb on the edge of a track painted in alternating colours, often red and white.
road course ringer
In NASCAR, a driver who generally competes only on road courses as a substitute for a team's primary driver. Such drivers are no longer used by top teams in the NASCAR Cup Series due to competition changes in the 21st century, but are still frequently used by lower-tier Cup teams and teams in other NASCAR series.

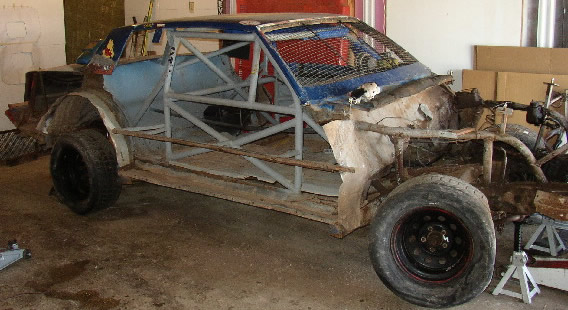
Roll cage

roll cage
A structure of metal bars installed into the interior of a production-based racing car. Originally created as a safety device, in more recent times it has also been used to substantially increase the torsional rigidity of a race car's frame.
roll hoop
A looped bar protruding above and behind the driver's helmet in open-wheel and prototype sports racing cars, placed so that in the event of a rollover, the car lands on the roll hoop rather than the driver's helmet. It may also serve as a convenient attachment point for cranes removing stopped cars from dangerous positions on the circuit.
rolling start
A starting method where moving cars start a race after the starter displays a green flag.
roof flap
An active aerodynamic element designed to keep a car on the ground when it is traveling in reverse.
rumble strip
A kerb with angled kerbstones that transmit vibration through any car that passes over, allowing drivers to feel the kerb and discouraging competitors from cutting corners.
roost
In off-road racing, the act of accelerating quickly in a corner to kick up dirt, dust, and rocks.
run-off area
An area off the track put aside for vehicles to leave the track without causing an accident in case of an emergency.

== S ==
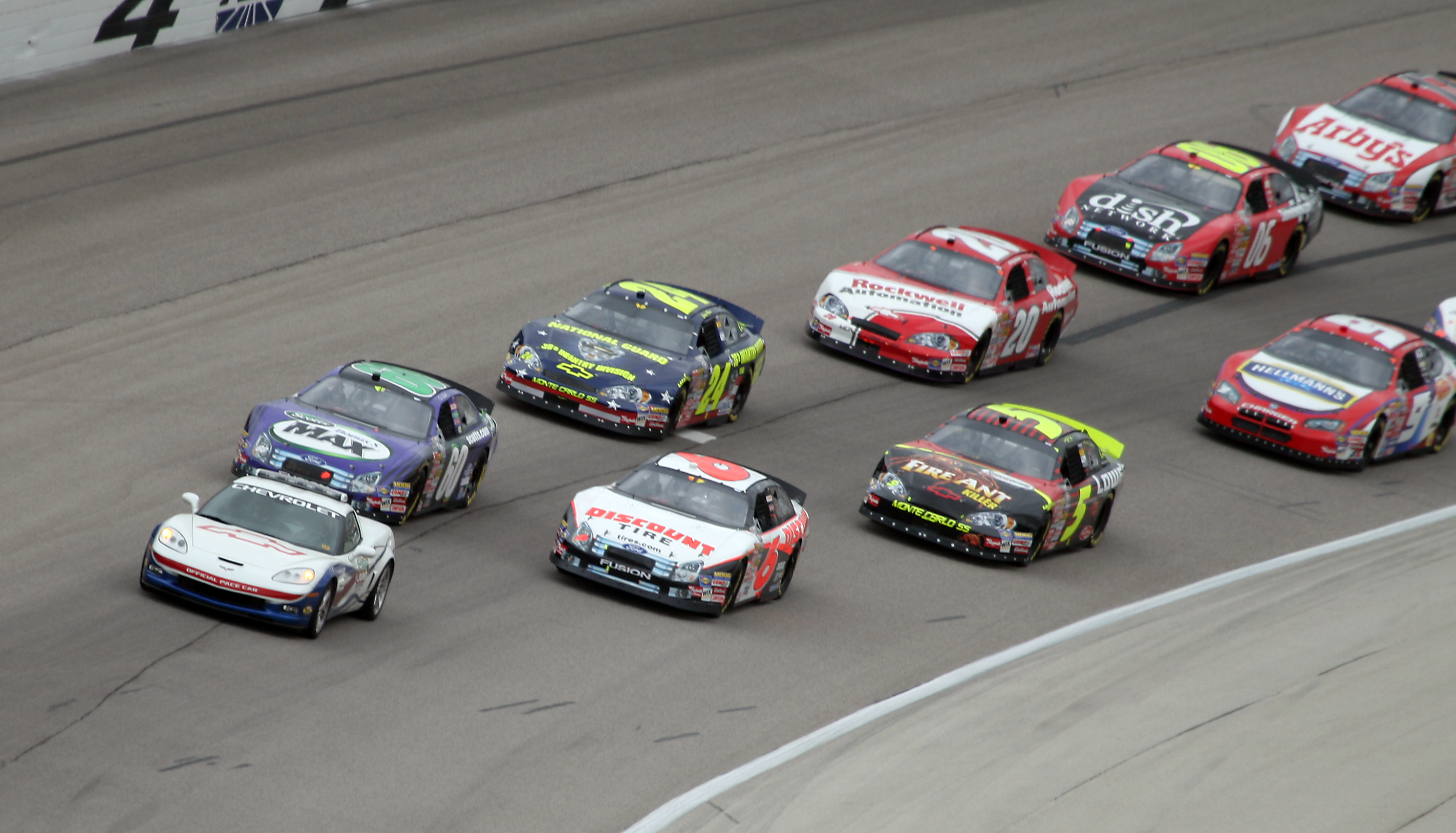
Chevrolet Corvette safety car leads the field in a NASCAR Busch Series race.

safety car
A car that limits the speed of competing cars on a racetrack in the case of an accident or caution periods caused by obstruction/s on the track.
sandbag
To gain a competitive advantage by deliberately underperforming at an event.
sand trap
An area at the very end of a drag strip to slow down and stop vehicles that have gone off the track, as a safety measure. It is filled with, as the name implies, sand.
satellite team
A second racing team either operated by or in partnership with a larger team, but maintaining a separate identity. The team may share vehicles and technology with the main operation, or may develop the careers of upcoming drivers, such as Scuderia AlphaTauri.
scattershield
A bell housing, or external shield surrounding a bell housing, designed to contain metal fragments in the event of clutch, flywheel, and/or transmission failure.
scrub
Also known as the Bubba Scrub; a jump technique in motocross in which the rider transfer their weight to the bike sideways at the face of the jump for a lower trajectory which decreases time spent in the air.
scrutineer
A qualified official who examines vehicles prior to a race for compliance with the rules of competition, usually in a scrutineering bay adjacent to the pit lane.
scuffs
Tires which have been used to a limited extent, but are not completely worn out. Scuffs may be put on a car during a pit stop to improve handling. At times, brand new tires may be scuffed in before a race by practicing in them for a lap or two. See also sticker tires.
seat
A full-time driving position in a team.
second driver / number-two driver
In Formula One, a driver who is perceivably a backup to the team's first or lead driver. Teams will generally favour a driver who is more likely to finish higher in the World Drivers' Championship. Second drivers are typically subjected to team orders and late arrivals of car upgrades. Notable second drivers include Riccardo Patrese, Gerhard Berger, David Coulthard, Rubens Barrichello, Mark Webber, Valtteri Bottas, and Sergio Pérez.
sector
A section of one complete lap of the circuit, used for timing purposes. In Formula One, each circuit is split into three sectors.
semi-automatic gearbox
A specialized motorsport application, created initially by Scuderia Ferrari for Formula One, in which the driver can change gears manually without having to manually activate the clutch. On open-wheel race cars and sports prototypes, it is usually activated by paddles immediately behind the steering wheel, although touring and rally cars are usually equipped with a more conventional centre console-mounted gear stick or a stalk connected to the steering column. When activated, the gearbox automatically disengages the clutch, changes gears, and re-engages the clutch without any further input from the driver.
semi-feature / B-main / qualifier
A qualifying race before the main event, where non-qualified cars compete for a predetermined number of spots in the main event. Some races have a C-main where the top finishers qualify for the B-main. At those events, the main event is known as the A-main.
setup
A set of adjustments made to the vehicle in order to optimize its behaviour.
shakedown
The first test of a new or rebuilt vehicle
shootout
See superpole
short shifting
A technique used, primarily in motorsport, to regain control of a car through a high speed corner. Involves the driver shifting up a gear earlier than usual.
shunt
A collision, usually involving side-to-side contact.
shutdown area
In drag racing, the 440-yard (400 m) stretch from the finish line to the sand trap, where cars decelerate and exit the drag strip.

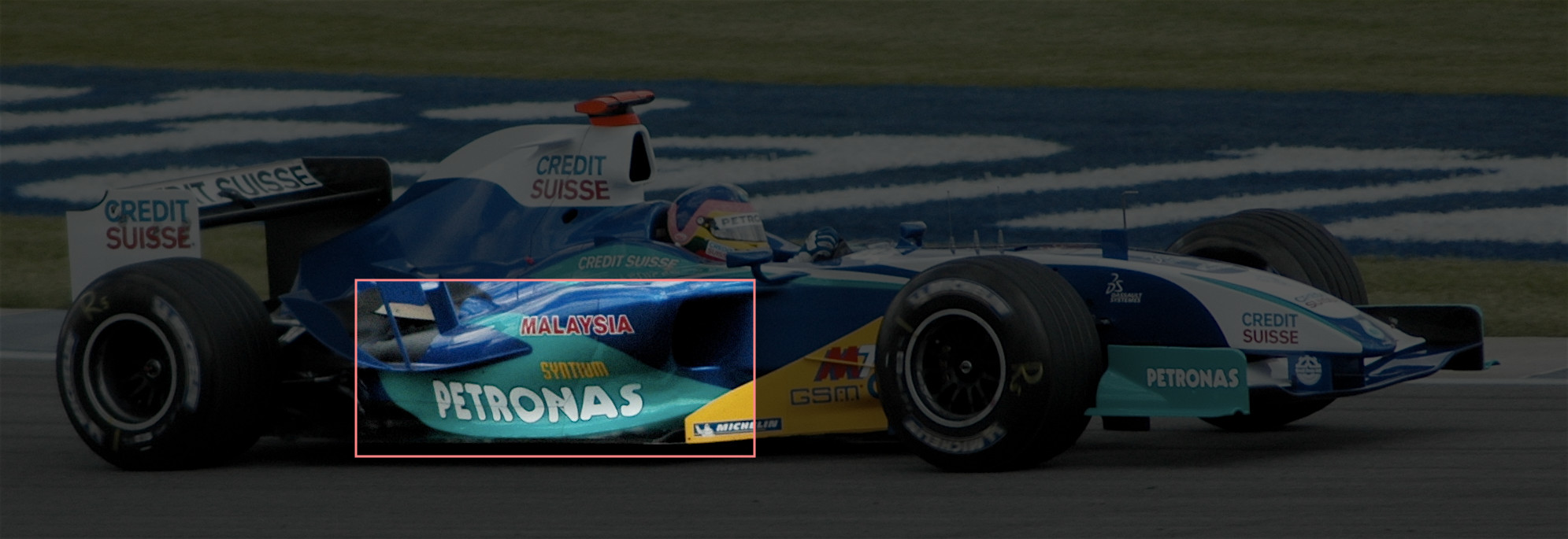
The Sauber C24 Formula 1 car with the right sidepod highlighted

sidepod
An aerodynamic device, positioned on either side of an open-wheel racing car or modern sports prototype, to improve airflow between the front and rear wheels, and to usually also feed air to a radiator housed inside it.

silly season
The period near and after the conclusion of the racing season during which teams and drivers may begin preparing to make changes for the upcoming season. Potential changes at a team may be new or different drivers, sponsors, engines/chassis, team personnel, and cars. Rumours often run rampant during the early stages of silly season. In some rare cases, teams may actually implement the planned changes during silly season rather than wait until the start of the new season. Such a move may give them a head start on the upcoming season, or may alleviate "lame duck" situations.
siping
The process of cutting fine grooves into a tire to improve traction and thermal characteristics.
skid plate
A metal plate, most commonly titanium, fixed to the bottom of flat-bottomed racing cars to protect the undertray from damage from the ground. Less common today, as racing cars are usually mandated to have a ground clearance that decreases the risk of bottoming out.
slapper bars
See traction bars.
sled
In truck and tractor pulling, an implement pulled behind the machine whose friction with the ground must be overcome by the machine.

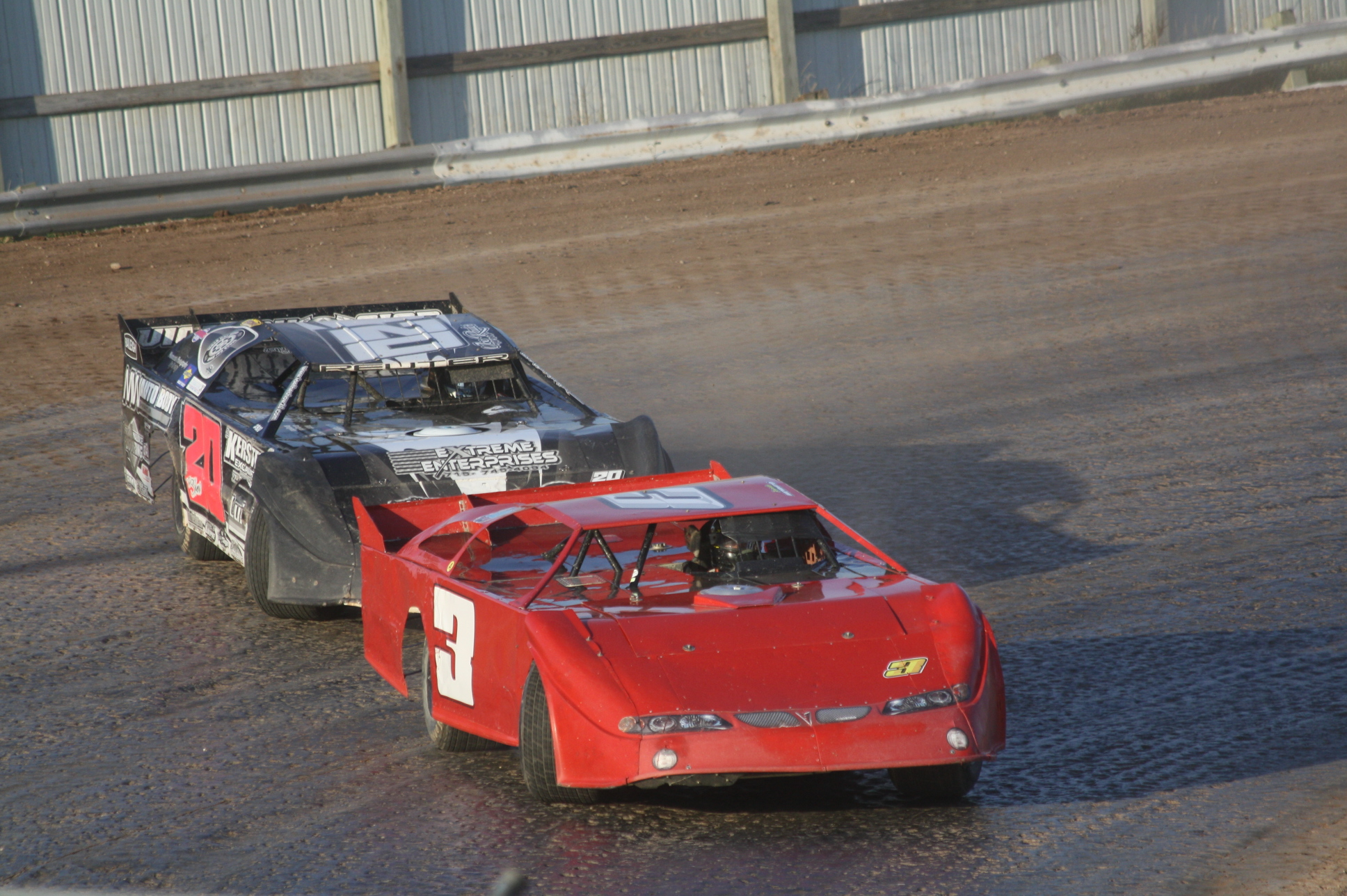
Late model stock cars on a slick dirt track

slick (clay oval)
A phenomenon caused by the drying out of the clay surface on short circuit oval tracks. If a minimum percentage of moisture on the track surface is not maintained, the clay will dry out, causing the rubber of the specialized clay circuit tires to prematurely wear the same way as on paved circuits, giving the track surface a noticeably black shade.

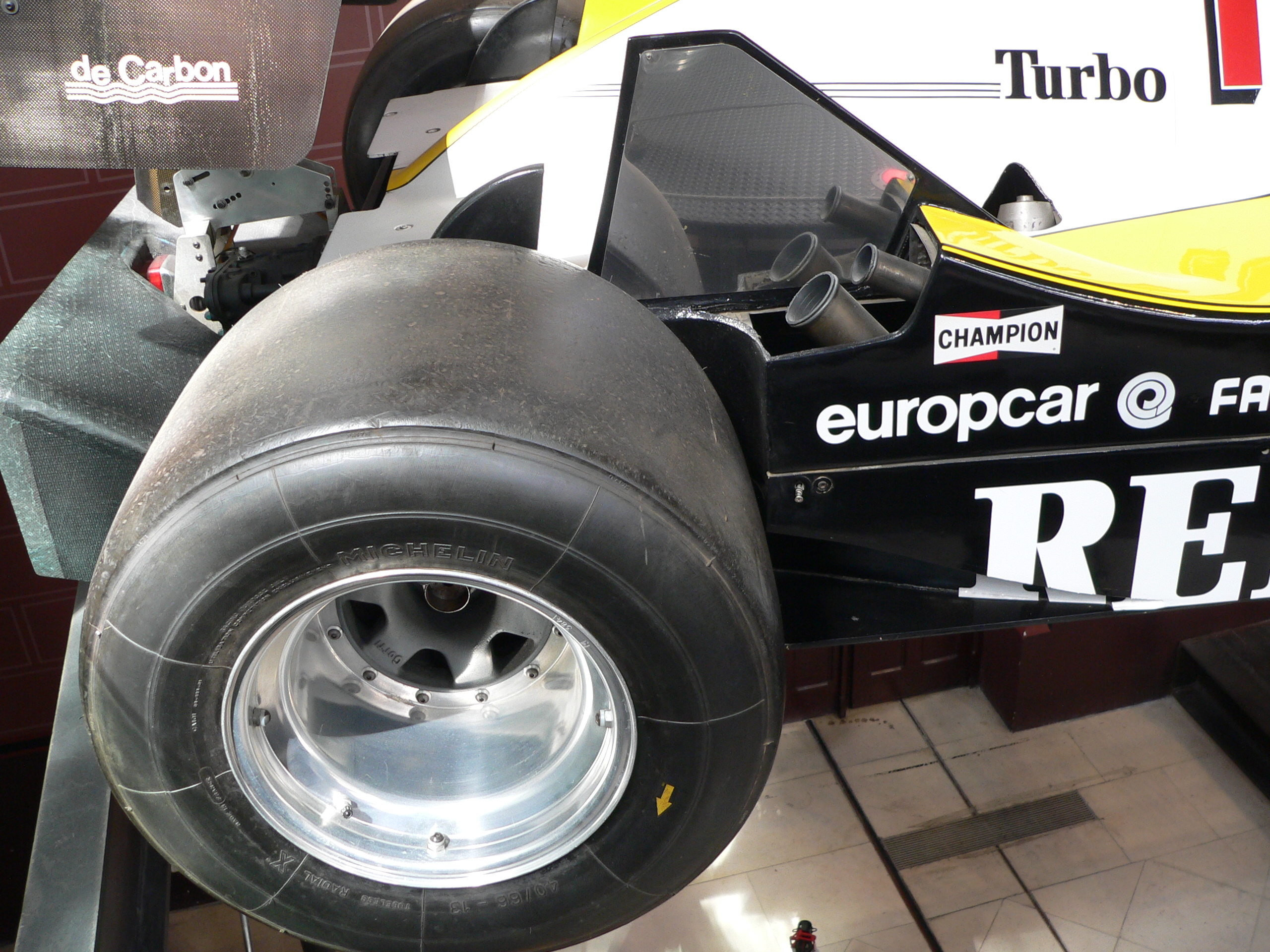
Formula One slick tyre

slick tyre
A tyre with no tread pattern, maximising the amount of rubber in contact with the racing surface. A specialist motor racing application, as in wet weather conditions these tyres have little resistance to aquaplaning.
slicks-and-wings
A single-seat formula car or series that uses slick tyres and aerodynamic wings. Typically used in junior formulae to signify the difference between lower categories—such as Formula Ford—and Formula 4.
slide job
Especially in dirt oval racing, when a car overtakes another car on the inside of a corner and deliberately oversteers in front of the vehicle being passed in an attempt to slow their momentum. The vehicle being passed often attempts to pass back by steering low coming out of the corner down the following straightaway.
slingshot
Front-engined dragster, named for the driving position behind the rear wheels (erroneously attributed to launch speed).
slingshot pass
A pass using drafting.
slipstreaming
When a car following close behind another uses the slipstream created by the lead car to close the gap between them or overtake. Also referred to as drafting.
smoking the tires
A term used mostly in drag racing, referring to when a loss of traction causes the rear tires to smoke profusely. This usually happens off the starting line. When this happens during a race, it usually results in a loss, unless the opponent also loses traction as well.
soup run
Term used when a driver in a low preliminary race advanced through multiple races to advance to a much higher feature. Common in midget and sprint car races where a driver advances from the C Main to the A Main that day, or in the final day, advances through three or more levels (H Main, advances to the G, F, and further, for example).

spare car
A car used by a driver if they have damaged their main car. It may or may not have the same setup as the primary car. Now banned in Formula One for cost-cutting reasons, though teams in many other major racing series have a spare car available at the track. At Indianapolis, it is traditionally called a T-car (a loose abbreviation of "training"). Also referred to as a backup car.
spec
See one-make racing.
special stage
A closed-off section of road or track, used for timed runs in rallying. A rally is made up of a number of special stages.
spin turn
A semi-doughnut maneuver which a driver may perform to turn themselves around in a tight space without using the reverse gear.
splash and dash / splash and go
A pit stop which only involves refueling the car, often less than a full tank.

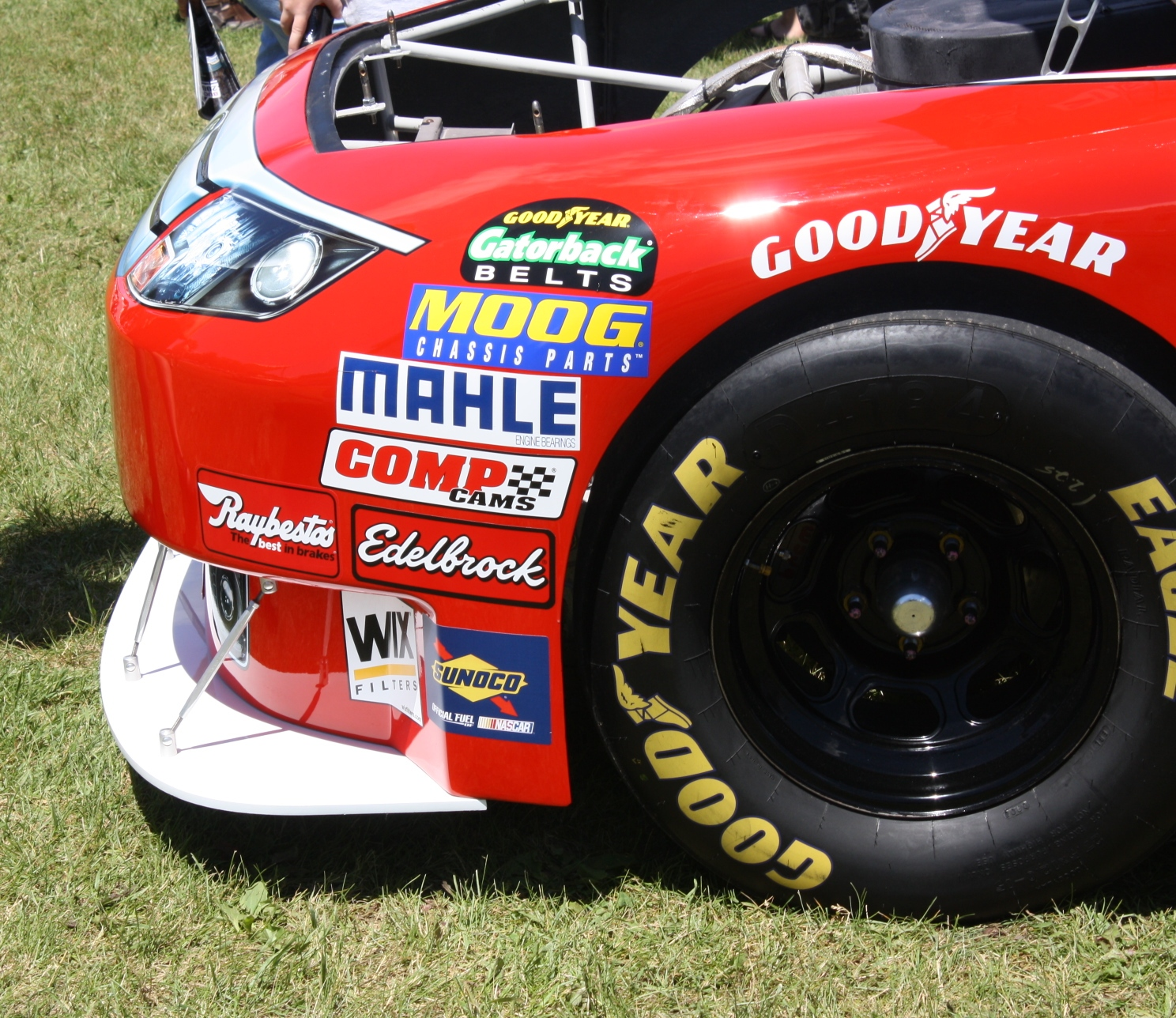
Splitter (in white) on a NASCAR car

split
In sim racing, a division in an endurance event. Splits are typically ordered numerically, where split 1 or the top split is the highest level of competition and awarded the main prize.
splitter
Also referred to as the front spoiler, air dam, or front diffuser, an aerodynamic device placed on the nose of some touring cars and grand tourers to improve airflow around the nose of the car, and sometimes create front downforce to aid in steering. It is prominent on NASCAR's Cars of Tomorrow, as well as second-generation Class 1 Touring Cars.
spoiler
An aerodynamic device attached to the trailing edge of a race car to increase its rear downforce. The difference between a spoiler and a wing is that air passes both over and under the aerodynamic surface of a wing, but only passes over a spoiler.
spotter
A person, positioned high above the circuit, who communicates what happens on the track to the driver.
sprint
A single-car event against the clock. Can be held over a stretch of road similar to hillclimbing, or may be held over one or more laps of a circuit, similar to time attack. The term may also refer to relatively short races, to distinguish from endurance races.
sprint car
High-powered racing cars generally raced on short dirt or asphalt ovals.
stagger
In stock car racing, the difference in circumference between the left and right tires, used to improve handling on oval tracks.
standard tree
In drag racing, timing lights which flash in sequence five tenths of a second between each yellow light before turning green. Traditional form, before introduction of pro tree.
standing start
A starting method where the race vehicles are stationary on the grid.
start and park
A team or driver who qualifies and starts a race but only runs a small number of laps to avoid using up resources (tires, parts, pit crew effort, etc.). The team or driver will intentionally drop out of the race, placing last or near to last, but will still collect the corresponding prize money and championship points.
steward
The adjudicator or referee at a race meeting who interprets incidents and decides whether penalties or fines should be issued.
sticker tires
Brand new tires put on a race car. Nicknamed "sticker tires" because the manufacturer's labels are still visible.
stint
A part of the race between two pit stops.
stop-go penalty / stop and go penalty
A penalty given to a driver for an on-track infraction that requires them to enter their pit box (or in some cases a special penalty pit box) and come to a complete stop before resuming. No work is allowed to be done on the car during the penalty, even if it is being served in the driver's own pit box. Doing work on the car would negate the serving of the penalty, and the penalty would have to be re-served the next time around. In some cases, the car is held in the box for a specified number of seconds before being allowed to resume. Since the early/mid-1990s, this penalty has seen less use, replaced in most cases by the drive-through penalty.
straight / straightaway
A straight line on a racing circuit.
stripe
The start-finish line.
success ballast
A method used to level performance between competitors by adding weight to cars that win races or are successful. Sometimes referred to as a lead trophy, as the usage of lead bars is most popular in applying the additional weight.
superpole / shootout
A selection procedure in which the ten or 15 fastest qualifiers compete for grid positions in a single-lap effort without other vehicles on the track. While not specifically referenced, most NASCAR races will use this style of qualifying for all cars.
support race
Race(s) that takes place before or after the main event race. It may also be held during a qualifying day, and is often used to provide a fuller weekend of track activity. It is normally a race from a lower or "ladder" series, is usually shorter in duration, and in some cases might feature some moonlighting drivers from the main event. It is analogous to an undercard in other sports.
super rally
When a rally driver retires on any day, except the last, they can continue the next day incurring penalties for the stages they did not drive, including the one they retired on. Currently, in World Rally Championship, a driver will be given the time of the fastest driver of their class, plus a five-minute penalty for each missed stage.
super special
A timed special stage in a rally on a purpose-built track, often in a stadium. Usually, two cars will set off at the same time in separate lanes, and at the halfway point of the stage they will swap lanes, usually via a crossover involving a bridge. A similar format is used in the Race of Champions.
sweeper
A large-radius medium- or high-speed corner on a circuit. Examples of sweepers include the Rabbit's Ear corner at Willow Springs, the area between Turns 10 and 11 at Albert Park Circuit, and the 200R corner and Dunlop Curve at Suzuka Circuit.
swinger
(from sidecar racing) A passenger on a racing motorcycle sidecar who athletically moves from one side of the sidecar to the other, altering a sidecar's weight distribution to assist in cornering speed and in some corners to prevent the sidecar from tipping over.
switchback / cutback / under-and-over
An overtaking or defensive manoeuvre where a driver—on the outside of the corner—takes a slower entry speed to turn in before their opponent and overtake them on the exit. A double-switchback involves two switchbacks into consecutive corners, typically of a chicane.

== T ==
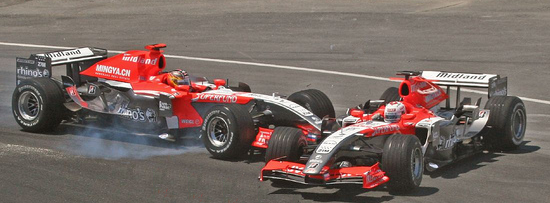
T-bone

T-bone
A collision in which the front of a car crashes into the side of another car, forming a "T" shape. This is one of the more dangerous types of crash due to the relative vulnerability of side impacts where there is much less deformable structure on the side of a car to protect the driver. Also, to crash into another car in such a fashion; the victim is "T-boned".
T-car
Alternative term for a spare car.
tank-slapper
When the front wheel of a motorcycle oscillates rapidly at speed, causing the handlebars to slap against the fuel tank. It is increasingly being used to refer to a vehicle that loses traction at the rear, regains traction and loses it again, causing the rear to weave side to side independently of the front of the car. This is more often referred to as fish-tailing.
tansō (単走, solo run)
In drifting, a Japanese term for individual passes where drivers are observed by judges in an attempt for the top spot.
team orders
The practice of one driver letting another from the same team or manufacturer gain a higher finish at the direction of the team management. Often employed to prevent the risk of an accident resulting in damage to both of a team's cars. The practice was briefly forbidden in Formula One as a consequence of the 2002 Austrian Grand Prix controversy. U.S.-based series (NASCAR, IndyCar, etc.) have rarely used team orders, and the practice is widely frowned upon due to sportsmanship issues and fan backlash.
team principal
A management position within many series responsible for overall management of the team, including its drivers, production, strategy, and operations.
tear-offs
Thin plastic sheets layered over a driver's visor or windshield for visibility. Drivers (or pit crews) tear one off after it becomes dirty.
template
A device used by sanctioning body officials to check the shape and dimensions of parts of racing vehicles.
ten-tenths
Refers to when a vehicle is driven to its absolute potential.
throttleman
In offshore powerboat racing, the boat's second occupant who works alongside the driver, whose role is to steer the boat. The throttleman's position is to adjust the trim tab whilst observing water conditions, and extract as much speed out of the boat by controlling the hand throttle during a race whilst it hops over tides. The latter prevents the propellers from spinning wildly whilst the boat is airborne, causing the engine to overrev and possibly leading to engine damage.
throw a belt
In drag racing, to lose the drive belt connecting the engine's crankshaft to the supercharger.
tight
See understeer.
time attack
A competition which involves cars running around the circuit one at a time in pursuit of the fastest lap time.
timed race
Instead of running a predetermined number of laps, a race runs for a predetermined amount of time (i.e. 24 Hours of Le Mans). This is common in endurance racing, although series such as Formula 1 have a limit on how long a race can be run (usually two hours), which means that a race may be ended after the time limit expires but before the predetermined number of laps is run.
tin-top
Road car-derived vehicles with a roof, mainly in touring car racing.
tire compound
On racing slicks: the 'hardness' of the tires relative to others available. Different tire compounds may provide greater durability at a cost to outright speed, and vice versa. In Formula One, there are five available: soft, medium, hard, intermediate, extreme wet.
tire shake
In drag racing, when the engine is putting out more horsepower than the drive axle can handle, causing the rear tires to shake violently. This results in a loss of speed and sometimes steering, and occasionally leads to on track accidents. Sometimes referred to in other disciplines as axle tramp.
top end
The part of an engine's power curve at higher engine speeds; in drag racing, the end of the drag strip where the finish line is.
track limits
The limits of the racing circuit, defined by the series' governing body. In Formula One and its feeder series, track limits have been defined by the white lines on the circuit-edge since 2021.
traction bars
In drag racing, struts fixed to the driven axle to keep it from twisting, which causes wheel hop (see below) and loss of traction.
traction control
An electronic system that regulates power supplied to the driven wheels to prevent wheelspin. It is banned in many forms of motor racing.
trap
In drag racing, the 20-metre (66 ft) timing lights at the top end of the drag strip to measure speed & E.T.
trap speed
In drag racing, speed as measured by the speed trap near the finish line, indicative of the maximum speed reached on a pass.
tsuisō (追走; 'chase-attack')
In drifting, a Japanese term for tandem passes, where two cars are paired against each other over two passes within a heat, with each driver taking a turn to lead.
triple-header / triple header
Three consecutive race weekends in a series.

== U ==
undercut
Making an earlier pit stop in an attempt to gain time on other competitors. The opposite of an overcut.
understeer
Cornering behaviour where the front wheels do not follow the steered course, but instead push out toward the outside of the turn. Known as push in NASCAR and other stock car racing. The opposite of oversteer.
undertray
Flat or stepped flat surface on the bottom of open wheel and sports prototype racing cars. Theory has varied along with aerodynamic developments and regulations, from the sidepod tunnels of ground effect to the flat undertrays of the 1980s in various attempts to use aerodynamics to suck the cars closer to the bitumen, minimising the air underneath the car that could slow its progress. Today most such categories feature a stepped undertray with sidepods siting higher in the air than the centre of the car, usually mandated by series organisers in an attempt to limit vehicle performance. Also refers to flat surfaces extending behind splitters in sedan and GT based racing cars.

== V ==
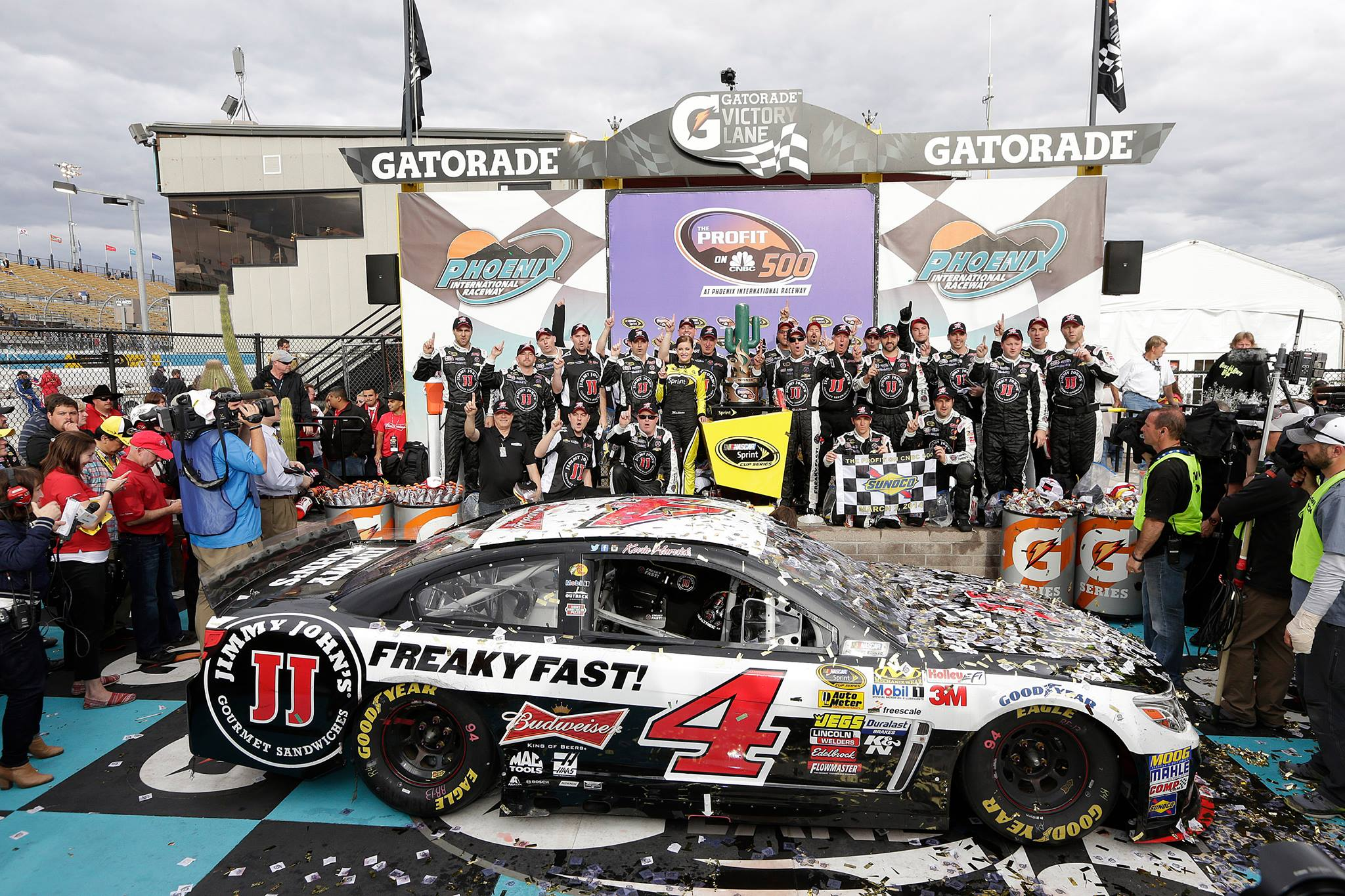
Victory lane

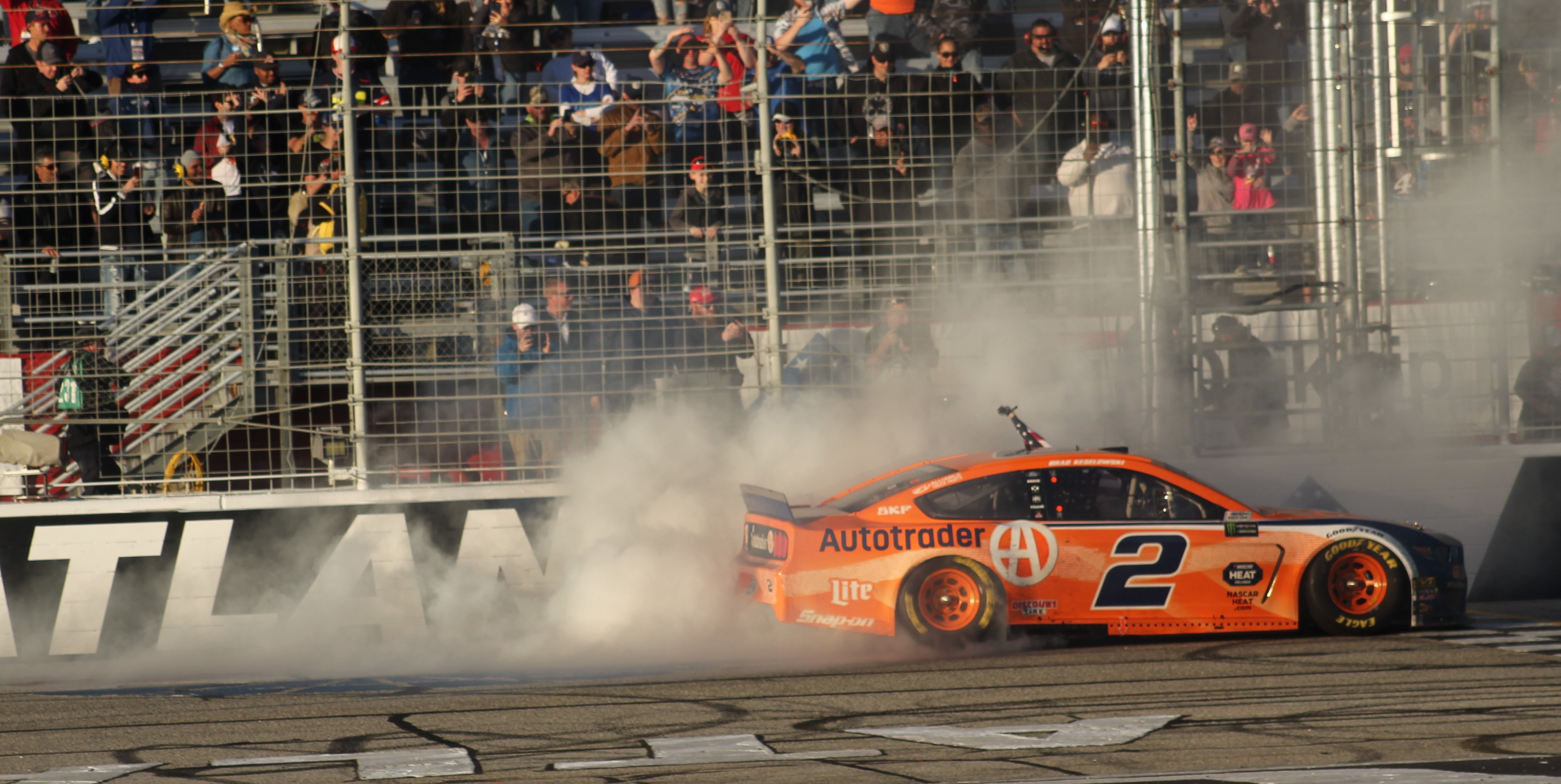
Brad Keselowski celebrating victory lap

victory lane
Also winner's circle, because of early motorsport's roots at horse racing tracks, the American term for the place where the winner of a race goes to celebrate victory after winning an event.
victory lap
A lap, after the conclusion of the race, where the winning racer drives at reduced speed to celebrate their victory.

== W ==
The Wally
In the NHRA, The Wally is the nickname of the trophy that is earned by the winner of an event. The nickname refers to the founder of the NHRA, Wally Parks.
wastegate
A device attached to a turbocharger, used to limit the additional horsepower it produces. It consists chiefly of a valve that is opened when sufficient turbocharger pressure is reached, preventing further boost pressure from accumulating and protecting the engine and turbocharger system from damage.
weight shifting
A technique used to reduce understeer. This involves the driver decelerating through a corner to shift the weight of the car from the back to the front, increasing front grip.
wet (or wet-weather) tyre
A racing tyre with deep grooves designed to displace standing water, allowing the tyre to obtain grip in conditions where dry weather tyres (slicks) would aquaplane.
wheel banging
When the wheels of two different race cars slightly collide during an overtaking manoeuvre.
wheel hop
In drag racing, when a car violently shakes as the tires lose and regain traction in quick succession.

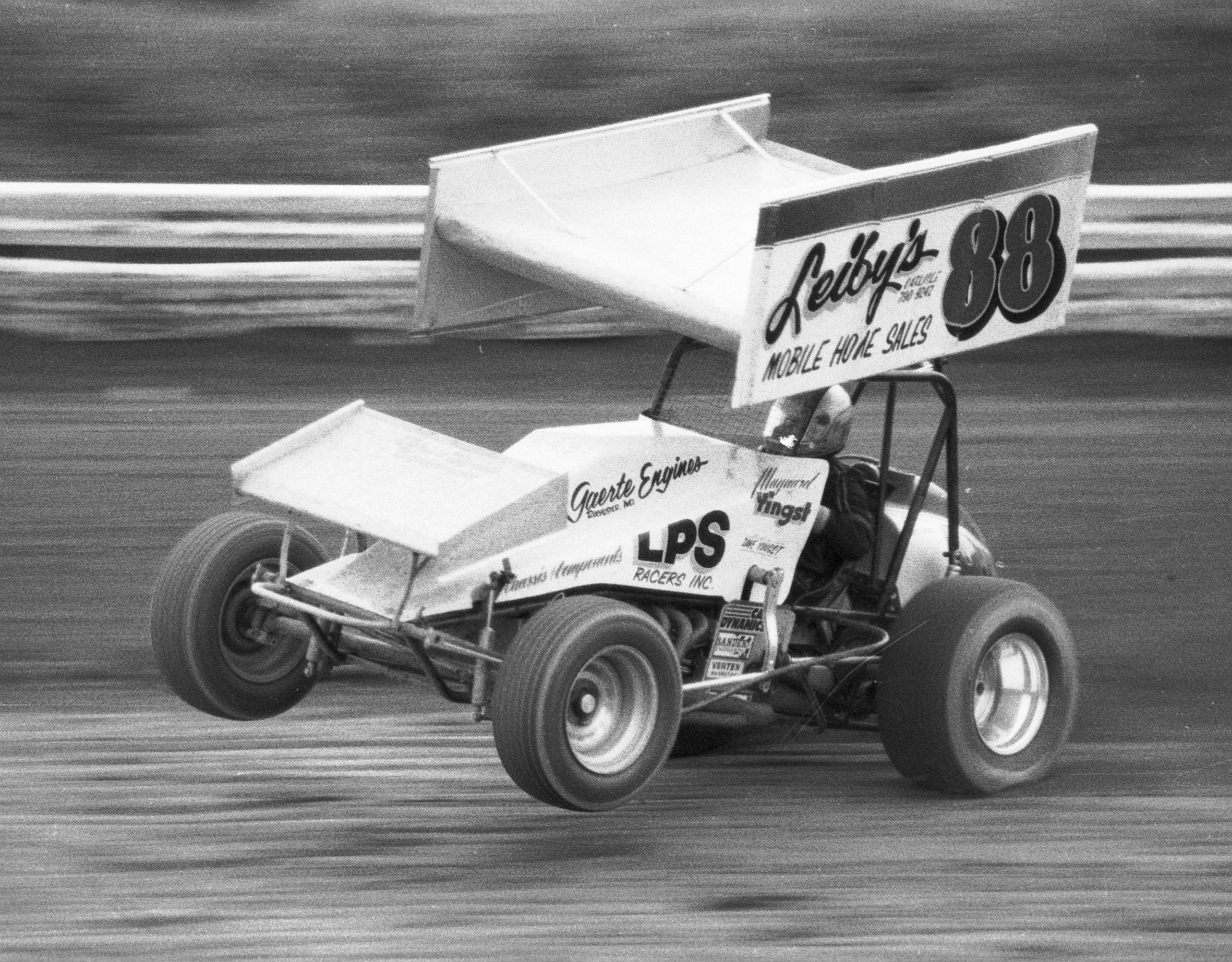
Maynard Yingst performing a wheelie in his sprint car

wheel shroud
A wheel cover designed to distribute airflow to the brakes, assisting with cooling. Saw common use in Group C, in IndyCar until banned in 1993, and in F1 between 2006 and 2009.
wheelie
When a vehicle's front wheel(s) leave the ground under hard acceleration.
wheelie bars
In drag racing, struts fixed to the rear of the car which protrude rearward to prevent a car's front from raising too high or flipping over on launch.

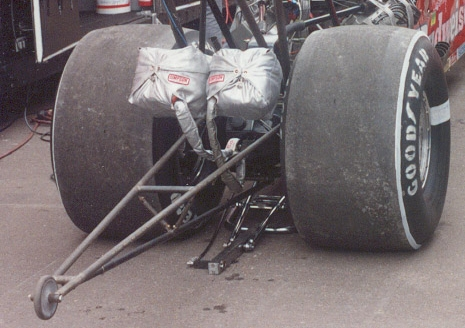
The wheelie bar (foreground) and parachute (gray) on Kenny Bernstein's Top Fuel dragster

wheelspin
When the rear tyres (or front tyres in the case of a front wheel drive vehicle) break traction with the racing surface under acceleration, spinning the wheels faster than they move across the surface. On higher traction surfaces like bitumen the tyre will begin to shred and melt from the friction, producing white smoke.
wheelstand
In drag racing, a severe wheelie where the car is pitched nearly vertically.
whip
A motocross technique in which the rider pitches their bike sideways and repositions themselves for the landing whilst airborne.
wickerbill
See Gurney flap.
wing
An aerodynamic device on many racing cars. The principle is the same as with an airfoil, except that in motor racing applications, the wing is inverted to create downforce instead of lift, pressing the car onto the road surface to increase traction.
wishbone
A suspension control arm with three points, shaped roughly like a chicken wishbone.
works team
A motor racing team supported by a vehicle manufacturer, usually run in-house at the manufacturer's premises. A works driver is a driver who drives for the works team.

== Y ==
yellow checker
A term derived when the final lap in a race is completed during a full course yellow while the field is under the control of the safety car. In this instance, the yellow and checkered flags are waved together, and the race is declared finished with the order the same as when the full course yellow began. IndyCar has a yellow checker rule, and NASCAR allows it if a race is shortened because of a curfew or darkness, if the race is already on its final lap when the yellow must be waved, or if there is a yellow implemented after the leader crosses the finish line during a valid green-white-checker finish once the race has restarted. In Formula One, when there is a yellow checker, the safety car will not lead the leader to the finish line.

== Z ==
zero car
In rallying, the official vehicles (numbered 000, 00, and 0) that run through a special stage at near rallying speeds to check for road conditions, obstructions, and safety risks (such as spectators or animals) prior to the rally cars running through the course, as well as to notify the public of the rally event.
