= Impound race (NASCAR) =

Occasional auto racing rule

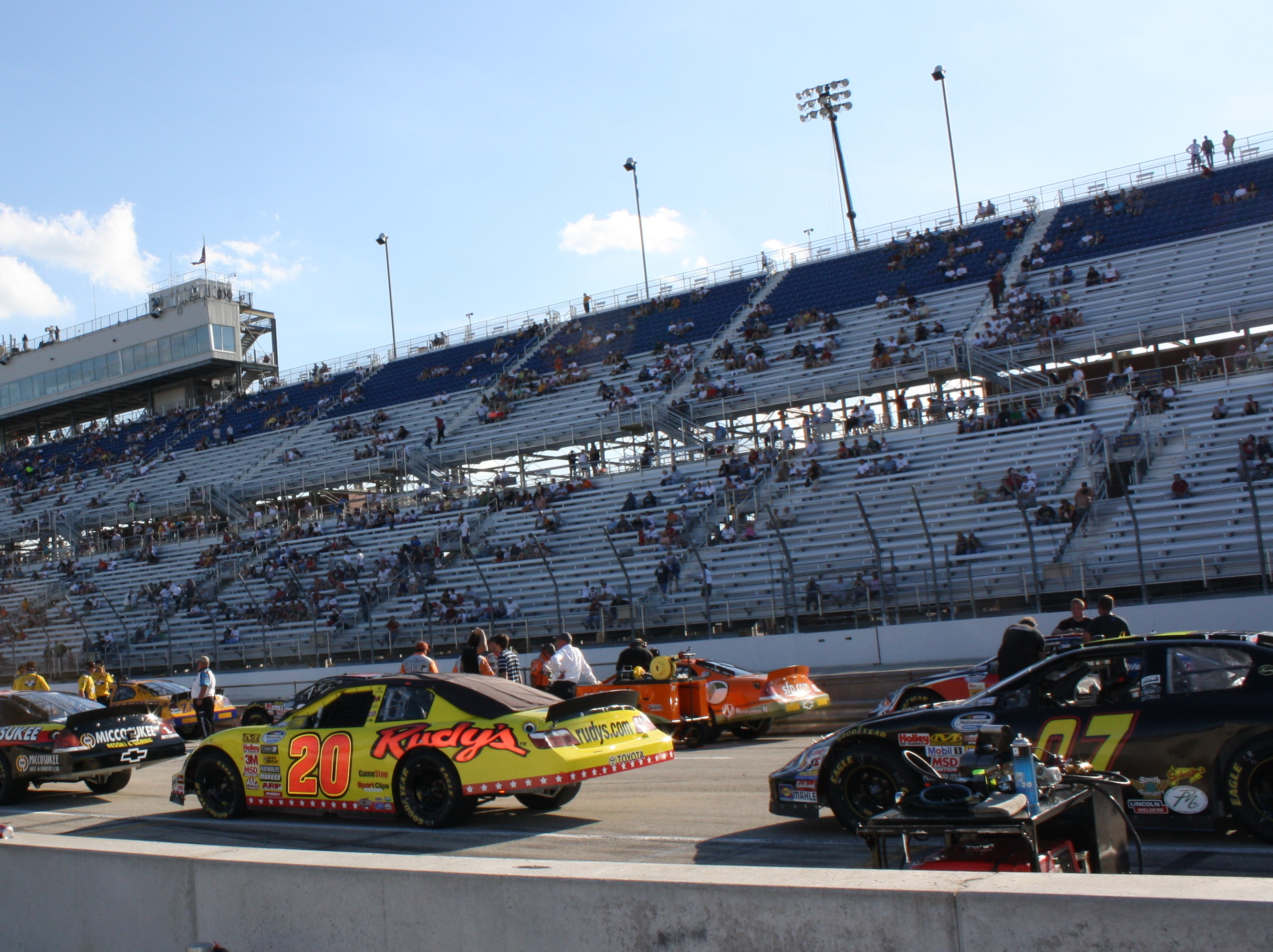
Impounded NASCAR Nationwide cars in 2009 on the front stretch at the Milwaukee Mile

An impound race (known as parc fermé in other motorsport) is a race where the crew members are not allowed to make any adjustments to the car after qualifying and before the race.

== History ==
The first impound races in NASCAR were implemented during the 2005 season. The concept of the impound race was designed to limit the costs of racing, and thus make it more affordable for all teams. This was to have the effect of leveling the playing field between the small limited budget teams and well financed multi-car teams. Initially these new rules were confusing, limited schedules, and made the events hectic for the teams. Over time NASCAR adjusted, tweaked, and changed the rules so they were less imposing. In 2005 a total of 21 out of the scheduled 36 races were run as impound races. The NASCAR series (Nextel at that time) director John Darby said "Ultimately, all the teams will arrive at the track with a focus on one goal," ... "That goal will be to have the best possible race setup, and hopefully that will enhance the overall competitive element throughout the field." The displeasure of the drivers, owners, and team members forced NASCAR to back pedal from 21 impound races in 2005, to a total of 5 races in 2006.

== After qualifying rules ==
Depending upon the layout of the track, and the resources available, how the rules are implemented may differ from track to track. They are rather defined however; once qualifying is complete, then only 2 crew members are allowed into the garage at a time, and only in the presence of NASCAR officials. The crew members inside the garage are subject to the following rules:

- they may not jack up the car or lift any part of the car.
- they may not add water or change the cooling system pressure.
- they may not get inside the car.
- they may not any adjust or change any shocks, bolts or adjust the sway bar.
- they may not add fuel, oil, or brake fluid.
- they may not adjust any body components including the spoilers or fenders
- they may not remove air box
- they may not change or add any components or spring inserts

If the crew members violate any of the rules, and/or adjust any part of the car that was not allowed by NASCAR, the car is relegated to the rear of the field at the start of the race.

What teams were allowed to do was:

- Shut off electrical switches and master power switch
- Remove radio
- Check air pressure in tires
- Cover the car

and then Crew members must exit the garage and close the garage doors. The process of selecting their pit road stalls for race day was done immediately after the last team had completed qualifying.

== Race day rules ==
On race day NASCAR officials will escort a maximum of 2 crew members to their respective stalls. Once there, teams may perform the following tasks:

1. Plug in oil heater (any generators must remain outside the garage)
2. Open hood
3. Prime oil system
4. Back car out of garage to start
5. Turn master switch on
6. Open oil cooler bypass valve (optional)
7. Start engine
8. Close hood
9. Adjust tire pressure
10. Torque wheels
11. Install radio and water bottle
12. Change, remove, or repair tape on front of car (i.e. grille, valance, brake ducts, etc.)
13. Equipment batteries may be replaced, but only under NASCAR supervision.

Teams are still restricted to the same rules as qualifying day "may not" rules. The number of crew members performing fuel pump operations are limited to a maximum of three crew members per car at any time; and must be escorted by NASCAR officials.

- For tracks 1 mile and under, a maximum of two gallons of fuel may be added.
- For tracks 1½ miles, a maximum of three gallons of fuel may be added.
- For tracks above 1½ miles, a maximum of four gallons of fuel may be added.

Height platform: A maximum of three crew members per car at any time, accompanied by NASCAR officials, may escort the respective car to the height platform.

Teams may:

1. Adjust front and rear wedge bolts: A maximum of one turn for front bolts. A maximum of 1½ turns for rear bolts.
2. Adjust track bar at frame end adjuster. No maximum on track bar adjustment.
3. Adjust external shock bleeds.

Teams may not:

1. Change any components.
2. Add spring inserts.

Scales: A maximum of three crew members are allowed to attend to the car at any time and must be accompanied by NASCAR officials Officials will escort team members and the respective car to the scales. Any car that does not meet required weight specifications may be subject to penalty. After completion, the generator may be reconnected to the car and pushed to pit road. Generators will be permitted out on pit road with the car.

== Weekend schedule ==
The impound rules caused a great deal of consternation when they were first implemented. The typical schedule allowed drivers two sessions of practice time on track on Friday, and qualifying would happen the following day, Saturday. In addition, teams were usually allotted two additional practice session on Saturday.

== See also ==
- Glossary of motorsport terms § I
- Glossary of terms: Parc fermé
- Parc fermé
