= Fan car =

A fan car uses a combination of fans and skirts to increase downforce under a racing car.

== Racing cars ==
- Chaparral 2J (1970) sports-prototype racing car
- Brabham BT46B (1978) Formula 1 car
- McMurtry Spéirling (2021) sports car
- Tesla Roadster (2028) electric sports car

== Miniature robotics ==
- Micromouse autonomous racing, using fans for downforce during cornering
