= Bootleg turn =

Driving maneuver

A bootleg turn is a driving maneuver intended to reverse the direction of travel of a forward-moving automobile by 180 degrees in a minimum amount of time while staying within the width of a two-lane road. This maneuver is also known as a smuggler's turn, powerslide, or simply bootlegger. Handbrake turn is also a way.

== Technique ==
The driver performs the turn by putting the vehicle quickly into a lower gear, usually the second, and quickly turning the wheel in the direction of the opposite lane. If performed correctly, it will cause the vehicle to enter a controlled skid, enter the opposite lane, and turn completely around. In a perfect bootleg turn, the car will be at a complete stop at the end of the maneuver and ready to accelerate and depart in the opposite direction.

It is easier to initiate this with some cars by applying a flick of the steering wheel the wrong way initially, before turning it in the direction the driver wants to go. This maneuver (known in racing as a Scandinavian flick) increases the load transfer to the outer wheels.

Classic bootleg turns can be performed only on cars with a manual transmission and are most easily accomplished with a rear-wheel-drive car, as the spinning back wheels aid in the turn. This is because the maneuver is essentially a controlled fishtail-like spin-out. Vehicles with an automatic transmission can be modified to make a bootleg turn possible. This is a most common modification for stunt vehicles used in motion pictures, to reduce the stress on the stunt driver to change gears while turning.

Drivers of cars with a handbrake connected to the rear wheels can enter a controlled turning skid by employing the handbrake, locking the wheels, and turning the steering wheel sharply in either direction. This maneuver can also be called a bootleg turn, but is more precisely described as a handbrake turn. Using the handbrake to break the traction of the rear wheels is much simpler than trying to do this by power alone.

== Origins ==
The name of the turn originates from its use by bootleggers transporting illegal liquor to escape from police officers. Bootleggers were notorious for using modified high-speed cars to transport their goods and for using daring driving maneuvers to escape authorities. The man credited with inventing the bootlegger turn is Robert Glenn "Junior" Johnson, who ran liquor from his father's moonshine still and went on to become a highly successful NASCAR racer.

Other nations and languages have their own colloquial names for the maneuver. For instance, it is known as "Cavalo-de-pau" (wooden horse) or "Baianada" (a pejorative reference to the state Bahia) in Brazil.

== Related ==
A "moonshiner's turn", or J-turn, or Rockford turn begins instead with a stationary automobile accelerating straight backward for a few seconds before the steering wheel is turned quickly to complete a skidded 180 degree turn.

== In popular culture ==
In the 1979 made-for-TV film Death Car on the Freeway protagonist Janette Clausen (Shelley Hack) is taught this maneuver in a defensive driving course, here referred to as a “bootlegger's turnaround.” She ultimately evades the killer by use of it, which results in his crash and presumed death.

The presidential limousine performs an emergency bootleg turn near the start of "In the Shadow of Two Gunmen, Part I", the first episode of season 2 of U.S. television series The West Wing.

In the film Pirates of the Caribbean: Dead Men Tell No Tales, whilst being pursued by Captain Salazar, a young Captain Jack Sparrow orders the crew to throw a heavy rope over a nearby rock formation near a cave entrance to force the Wicked Wench pirate ship into a sharp 180-degree turn, to escape the aforementioned Captain and his own ship.

Similar maneuvers are used in many car chases in film and TV, including numerous episodes of Knight Rider and similar shows.

In the Shadowrun 6e Actual play Emerald Glitch on Twitch this maneuver is quickly renamed as the "Donut Hole" much to the consternation of the GM.

== See also ==
- J-turn
- U-turn
- Stunt
- Drifting (motorsport)
