= Tafheet =

Illegal sideshow-like automotive subculture in Saudi Arabia

Tafheet

Tafheet (Arabic: تَفْحِيط) or hajwala (هَجْوَلَة), (Note: Also spelled Hagwalah, Hagwallah, or Hjwlh or Hgwlh in Saudi Arabizi.) also colloquially known as Arab drifting or Saudi drifting, is a type of sideshow-like subculture believed to have started in the late 1970s in Saudi Arabia, which involves driving cars that are generally non-modified or factory-setup (sometimes stolen or rented cars) at very high speeds, around 160–260 km/h (100–160 mph), across wide highways throwing the car left and right to mimic the appearance of drifting. In the process, drivers often drive dangerously close to traffic, barriers, and spectators watching from the roadsides without any protection.

Tafheet driver practice and events are generally seen on the wide sectioned highways of Riyadh, Al-Qassim Province and, less notably, in other parts of Saudi Arabia. In the United Arab Emirates, tafheet are commonly seen on the highways of Abu Dhabi and Dubai, which also feature long straightaways.

Apart from the risk involved for the drivers, spectators are also at a high risk of injury or possible death. Drivers sometimes lose control of their vehicles and drive into other road users or spectators.

The technique differs from high-speed cornering on tracks as cars drift sideways at high speed and recover with opposite lock. Tafheet practice and events occur with little or no concern for vehicle occupants, other drivers, or spectator safety, and as a result there often are fatal accidents.

== Culture ==
Some of the more popular tafheet maneuvers include:

- Aksiyat (عكسيات) or 3ksyat in Saudi Arabizi, meaning lit. "reversals": turning the car 180 degrees from side to another completing a full 360 by starting from the right to the left or opposite.
- Harakat Al-Mawt (حَرَكات المَوت, lit. "movement of death"): power slides where one must keep the car going on forward in a straight line until the car stops by itself without fixing the steer or going off track
- Sefty (سفتي), lit. "pull over"): turning the car a full 360 degrees starting from any side and then spinning the opposite side of the first 360 with a short power slide between
- Ta'geed (تَعقِيد, lit. "Loops"): turning the car a full 360 degrees while driving either straight or sideways more than once
- Tanteel (تنْطيل): repeatedly creating powerslides and steering it back with opposite lock at high speed 160–260 km/h (100–160 mph), starting with 4 or more power slides and usually concluded with Ta'geed, Sefty, or 'Aksiyât. It is also considered the main maneuver.
- Tatweef (تَطوِيفْ, lit. "circuiting"): passing another vehicle, truck, or more going sideways at very high speed up to 160 km/h (100 mph) on a public highway no matter how busy the traffic is

The cars are generally stock mid-size or entry-level luxury sedans, usually front-wheel drive, such as the Toyota Camry, Toyota Avalon, Kia Optima, Kia Cadenza, Honda Accord, Nissan Altima, Nissan Maxima, Chevrolet Cruze, Chevrolet Malibu, Hyundai Azera, Hyundai Sonata, Hyundai Elantra, Hyundai Accent, and they also drive rear-wheel drive cars such as the Chevrolet Caprice, Chevrolet Lumina, Dodge Charger, Toyota Hilux (in RWD mode), or any other vehicles they could get their hands on, minimizing personal cost and repair liability. While there have been instances involving high-end vehicles such as Rolls-Royces, Ferraris and Nissan GT-Rs, these are relatively less common compared to joyriders stealing sedans or compact cars for the purpose of drifting, abandoning them after an event.

SUVs and pickup trucks, most notably the Toyota Land Cruiser family (both the modern and classic variants), are sometimes used for this purpose.

Sociologists and criminologists in the region cite what is locally known as "tufush", roughly translating to idleness or desperation, indicating "the lack of recreational activities that might interest them", hence why many young Saudis turn to the extreme underground sport despite both safety risks and law enforcement reprisals.

== Response ==
Often, reports about high-speed drifting from concerned citizens demanding arrest are submitted because of the risk to public safety. Drifters are rarely caught as tafheet events are organised using illegal spotters; if they were, investigations often prove fruitless. Occasionally, police attempt to intercept them but are chased away by both them and spectators. When drifting activities were at its peak, Saudi Arabia had one of the highest traffic accident death tolls in the world.

In March 2014, Ahmad Shtewi Al-Ruwaili (born 1992), nicknamed "King Al-Nazeem", was sentenced to ten years in prison and 1,000 lashes for a series of drifting and firearms offenses in Riyadh and Al-Qassim Province. He died on 23 September 2016, aged 23, when his Kia Optima spun off and flipped over while drifting.

To combat this, academies and leagues have since been established by professional racers in the region in an effort to mitigate illegal street drifting incidents and to educate youths against the dangers of such activities, encouraging them instead to participate in officially sanctioned events.

With the Saudi government eager to end this life-endangering activity, the police needed to come up with a prompt solution. Speed limit cameras and GPS tracking systems began to roll out nationwide to ease apprehending the street drifters and enforcing stricter sanctions on reckless driving, among several measures taken by Saudi Arabia.

In June 2026, the Saudi Automobile and Motorcycle Federation (SAMF) enacted sporting regulations in an effort to legitimize hajwala into a legally sanctioned motorsport in the country, where drivers are required to wear a helmet and to have their cars fitted with safety equipment and certified by the SAMF in order to legally participate. The first such event took place on June 26 in Riyadh.

== See also ==
- Sideshow
- Street racing
- Boy racer
- Hoon
- Mat Rempit
- Ah Beng
- Touge

== Bibliography ==
- Abdullah Aldawsari, Investigating 'tafheet' as a Unique Driving Style Behaviour, 2016, Montfort University
- Suhasini Ramisetty-Mikler, Abdulkarim Almakadma, Attitudes and behaviors towards risky driving among adolescents in Saudi Arabia, International Journal of Pediatrics and Adolescent Medicine, 2016
- Pascal Menoret, Joyriding In Riyadh Oil Urbanism And Road Revolt, Cambridge University Press, 2014
- Salameh Ahmad Sawalah, Talal M. Abu-Mansour, Nesreen Mosa Al-Salem & Mohammad Luay M. Shaban, Steering speed suspension device (triple "S" device), to prevent burnouts-tafheet phenomena, IASET, 2013
- Imed Ben Dhaou, An electronic system to combat drifting and traffic noises on Saudi roads, Institute of Electrical and Electronics Engineers, 2012
