= Diffing =

Diffing may refer to:

- A type of drifting (motorsport) or doughnut (driving)
- diffing, use of the diff utility in computing
