= Spinning (motorsport) =

South African motorsport

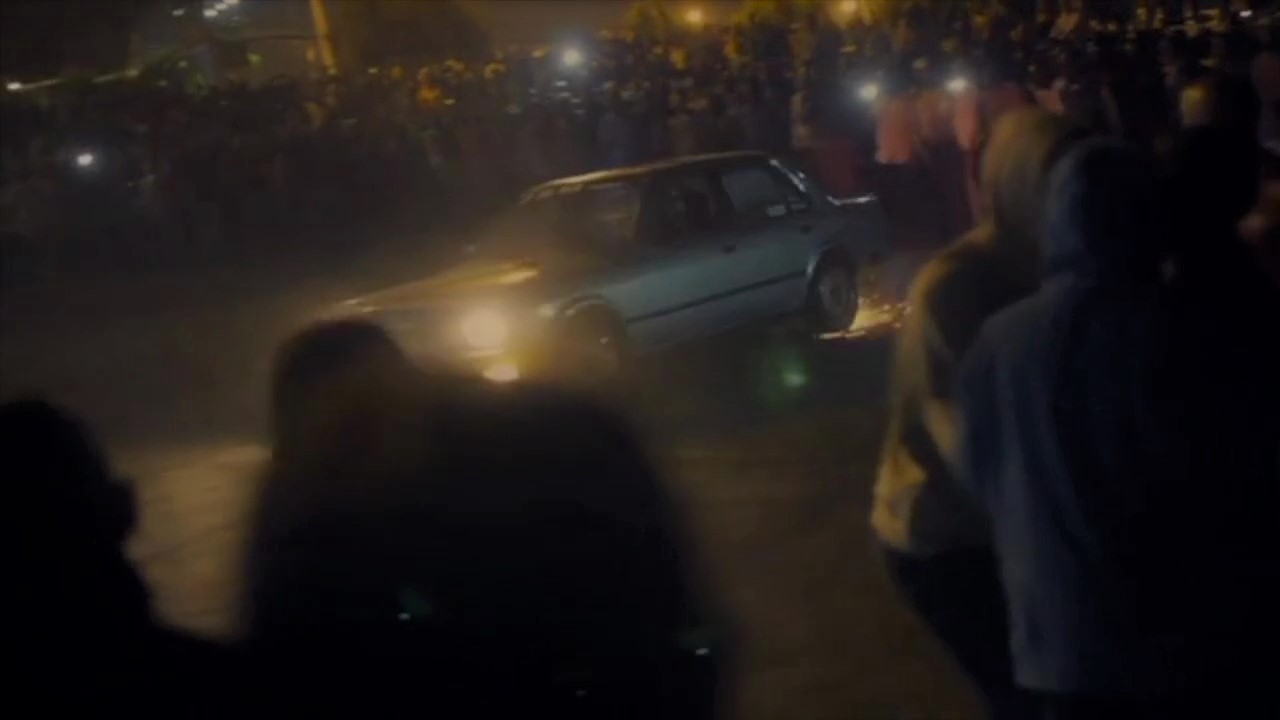
Spinning event at night

Spinning is a South African motorsport that involves driving cars at speed in circles and performing stunts in and out of the car. It originated in Soweto, Johannesburg in the late 1980s, and was performed as a funeral ritual in which a car was spun around to honour the deceased. It is now a recognised motorsport.

== History ==
Examples of spinning

The motorsport originated in Soweto, Johannesburg in the setting of apartheid and gangster culture. In the late 1980s, spinning increased in popularity. It was initially performed as a funeral ritual. A car would be stolen and spun around to honour the deceased.

In the early 1990s, spinning became practised outside of the criminal world. Drivers drag-raced and performed stunts with their cars. Spinning has since evolved to become more formalised as a legitimate sport, complete with promoters, performers, and spectators. Motorsport South Africa now regulates and licenses spinning events. In 2012, Motorsport South Africa recognised an event in Soweto in which the spinners received "Official Motorsport Licenses for Spinning". In 2014, spinning was recognised as an official motorsport by Motorsport South Africa. Nevertheless, informal and illegal spinning events still occur.

== Description ==
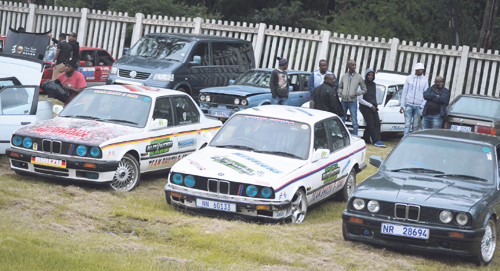
"Gusheshe" on display

The basic concept of the sport is that the driver drives in circles at speed and climbs outside of the vehicle to perform stunts. Spinning is related to drifting and is an extreme sport with elements of danger. In addition to drivers, spectators often stand close to the action and can be in harm's way.

== Top Known Spinners in South Africa ==
The 2022 Red Bull Shay’iMoto featured South African car spinners, focusing on technical vehicle control and performance.

- King Katra – A crowd favorite known for his jaw-dropping precision and daring moves.
- Veejaro Padayachee – A trailblazing female spinner who commands respect with her powerful performances.
- Shayal Ramduth – Famous for his smooth, stylish driving and bold techniques.
- Moses Nkunika and Sam Sambo – Icons of the scene, pushing boundaries with death-defying stunts.
- Samkeliso “Sam Sam” Thubane, from Hazyview, Mpumalanga, who is no stranger to victory of this competition.

These spinners embody the energy, danger, and excitement that define the spinning culture in South Africa.

Spinning can involve riders hanging out of the car with their heads close to the ground, or running alongside the spinning car. Some spinners balance on the car roof as the car does doughnuts, sometimes using bike chains or a partner to keep the steering wheel in place. The spinners will often select old tires with worn treads; popping tires is part of the sport and spinning on the rim marks completion. The spinners will usually drive around from one to five minutes, but can go as long as twenty minutes. The top speed rarely exceeds 60 kilometres per hour (37 mph).

The BMW 325i, known as "gusheshe", is iconic to the sport. In the early days, 5- and 7-series BMWs were favored, before the 3-series became preferred. The BMW 325 has rear-wheel drive and good stability. A BMW 325i can cost R20,000 (about US$1640), and because of the vehicle's image and scarcity, owners often prefer to repair their own vehicles despite the high cost. Other car models used in spinning include Toyota, Chevy, Ford, and Nissan Skyline.

== Popularity ==
Spinning has spread across southern African to places such as Zimbabwe and Eswatini. Part of the sport is the celebrity aspect, where drivers are known for their personalities as well as their driving abilities. Spinning has become a cultural phenomenon and has been featured in films and music videos.

Because of the nature of the sport, maintenance and repair of the car can become expensive. Most drivers, including those who are celebrities, have day jobs to pay for their sport. Even after being recognized as an official motorsport, spinning still lacks a formal sponsorship structure that would ensure drivers a reliable income. The average driver will not earn more than US$300 at an official event. In 2017, it was reported that a ticket to watch a spinning show cost about US$7.

In media, spinning has been seen in Die Antwoord's "Baby's on Fire" music video.

== Future prospects ==
There is a current debate between maintaining spinning's authenticity and moving towards regulation, such as safety regulations. In an unregulated setting, spinning and some car modifications are illegal under the National Road Traffic Act 93 of 1996. However, organizing a legitimate event can be prohibitively expensive. Thus, underground spinning events still occur.

== See also ==
- Car surfing
- Drifting
- Ghost riding
- Sideshow (automobile exhibition)
- Spinning with stance bikes
