= Left-foot braking =

Driving technique

Left-foot braking is the technique of using the left foot to operate the brake pedal in an automobile, leaving the right foot dedicated to the throttle pedal. It contrasts with the practice of using the left foot to operate the clutch pedal, leaving the right foot to share the duties of controlling both brake and gas pedals.

At its most basic purpose, left-foot braking is used to decrease the time spent moving the right foot between the brake and throttle pedals, and can also be used to control load transfer.

It is most commonly used in auto racing, where simultaneous gas and brake keeps revs up. In turbocharged vehicles, left-foot braking keeps pressure up and reduces turbo lag.

== Racing and rallying ==
Karts, many open-wheelers, and cars that are equipped with automatic transmissions, or semi-automatic transmissions with paddle-shifters (as used in motorsports such as Formula One) have no foot-operated clutch, and allow, or sometimes even require the driver to use their left foot to brake.

One common race situation that requires left-foot braking is when a racer is cornering under power. If the driver does not want to lift off the throttle, potentially causing trailing-throttle oversteer, left-foot braking can induce a mild oversteer situation, and help the car "tuck", or turn-in better. Mild left-foot braking can also help reduce understeer.

In rallying left-foot braking is very beneficial, especially to front-wheel drive vehicles. It is closely related to the handbrake turn, but involves locking the rear wheels using the foot brake (retarding actually, to reduce traction, rarely fully locking – best considered a misapplication), which is set up to apply a significant pressure bias to the rear brakes. The vehicle is balanced using engine power by use of the gas pedal, operated by the right foot. The left foot is thus brought into play to operate the brake. It is not as necessary to use this technique with rear-wheel drive and four-wheel drive rally vehicles because they can be easily turned rapidly by using excess power to the wheels and the use of opposite lock steering, however the technique is still beneficial when the driver needs to decelerate and slide at the same time. In rear wheel drive, left foot braking can be used when the car is at opposite lock and about to spin. Using throttle and brake will lock the front tires but not the rears, thus giving the rears more traction and bringing the front end around.

Finnish rally legend Flying Finn Rauno Aaltonen used left-foot braking as a driving style in rallying when he competed for Saab in the 1950s.

In restrictor plate NASCAR events, drivers were known to left-foot-brake at times, particularly in heavy traffic situations. Rather than lift off the throttle, which could lose considerable power and speed (due to the restrictor plates), a mild tap of the brakes while the right foot was still planted flat on the gas, could help avoid contact and bump drafting.

This technique should not be confused with heel-and-toe shifting, which is another driving technique.

=== Switch-foot braking ===
A left-foot braking technique occurs where the driver will complete the heel-and-toe downshift using standard right-foot braking at which time they will switch to left-foot braking. This is most often used by drivers wishing to employ left-foot braking, but that must still use the left foot to operate the clutch.

=== Throttle-braking ===
A braking technique where the driver will combine the use of left-foot braking with throttle to dynamically control brake bias and remove engine braking. In a rear wheel drive vehicle, greater throttle usage while braking will counteract the rear braking force and move the brake bias forward.

== Road use ==
Many commentators advise against the use of left-foot braking while driving on public roads. Critics of the technique suggest that it can cause confusion when switching to or from a vehicle with a manual transmission, and that it is difficult to achieve the necessary sensitivity to brake smoothly when one's left foot is accustomed to operating a clutch pedal. Other factors cited include potential brake damage as well as driver fatigue. Most of the arguments are based on the difficulty of switching from automatic to manual cars, and do not apply to people who only drive automatic cars.

However, some commentators do recommend left-foot braking as routine practice when driving vehicles fitted with an automatic transmission, when maneuvering at low speeds.

Proponents of the technique note that in low-speed maneuvers, a driver of a vehicle with a manual transmission will usually keep a foot poised over the clutch pedal, ready to disengage power when the vehicle nears an obstacle. This means that disengagement is also possible in the event of malfunction such as an engine surge. However, the absence of a clutch pedal on a vehicle with automatic transmission means that there is no such safety override, unless the driver has a foot poised over the brake pedal.

== Bibliography ==
- Ross Bentley (1998). Speed Secrets: Professional Race Driving Techniques. Osceola, WI, USA: MBI Pub. Co. ISBN 0-7603-0518-8.
- Henry A. Watts (1989). Secrets of Solo Racing: Expert Techniques for Autocrossing and Time Trials. Sunnyvale, Calif.: Loki Pub. Co. ISBN 0-9620573-1-2.
