= J-turn =

Driving maneuver

Animation of a J-turn

A J-turn is a driving maneuver in which a reversing vehicle is spun 180 degrees and continues, facing forward, without changing direction of travel. The J-turn is also called a "moonshiner's turn" (from the evasive driving tactics used by bootleggers), a "reverse 180", a reverse flick, a "Rockford Turn", a "Rockford Spin", or simply a "Rockford" popularized by the 1970s TV show The Rockford Files. A J-turn differs from a bootleg turn in that the vehicle begins in reverse gear. It is often performed by stunt drivers in film and television shows. It can be performed both on dry and snowy surfaces; the latter is preferable while learning the skill.

== Technique ==
The turn is achieved by transferring the momentum of the car by reversing quickly in a straight line then turning the wheel sharply while using a brake to lock the front wheels. The driver changes into a forward gear—typically first—as the nose comes about.

== World record ==
The narrowest J-turn was performed in a Renault Twingo, between barriers set 3.78 metres (12.4 ft) apart. The diagonal length of the car, 3.70 metres (12.1 ft), meant stunt driver Terry Grant had a gap of 4 centimetres (1.6 in) on each side. This happened at the National Exhibition Centre in Birmingham, UK, at the PistonHeads show on 11–13 January 2008.

== See also ==
- Handbrake turn
