= Lift-off oversteer =

Form of sudden oversteer

Lift-off oversteer (also known as trailing-throttle oversteer, throttle off oversteer, or lift-throttle oversteer) is a form of sudden oversteer. While cornering, a driver who closes the throttle (by lifting a foot off the accelerator, hence the name), usually at a high speed, can cause such sudden deceleration that the vertical load on the tires shifts from rear to front, in a process called load transfer. This decrease in vertical load on the rear tires in turn decreases their traction by lowering their lateral force (that perpendicular to the direction of travel), making the vehicle steer more tightly into the turn. In other words, easing off the accelerator in a fast turn can cause a car's rear tires to loosen their grip so much that the driver loses control and drifts outwards, even leaving the road tailfirst.

== Dynamics ==
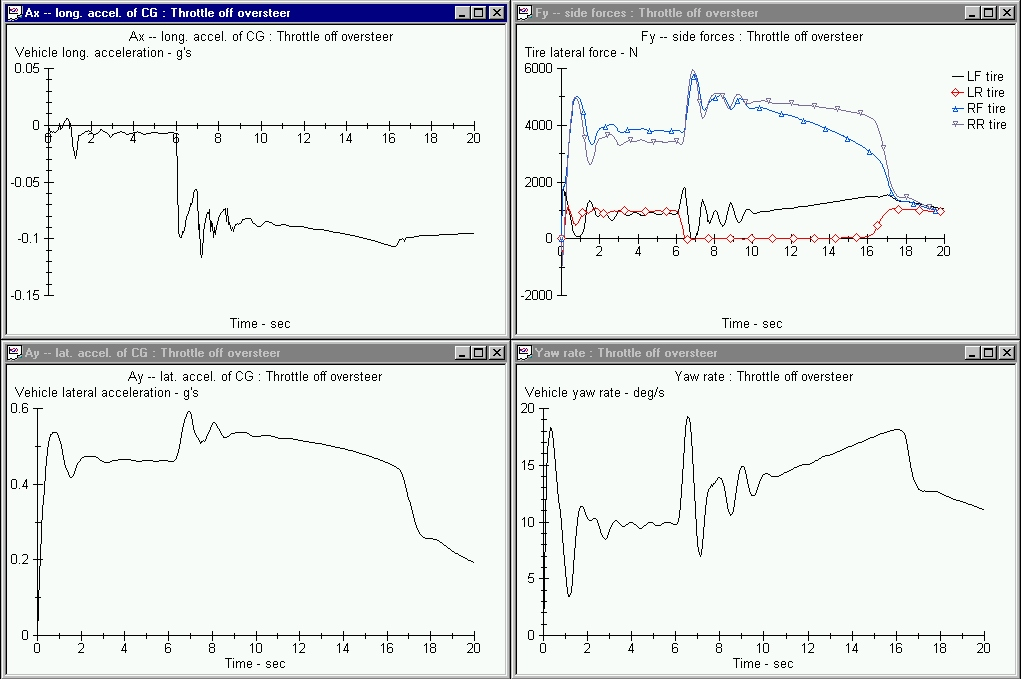

The graphs to the right show the simulated effect of lifting off the throttle in the middle of a left turn. The transients in the first couple of seconds are due to the test, in which a step steer input (wheel angle) is applied at 0 s and held constant throughout. The steady state cornering is at constant speed, with a lateral acceleration of 0.45 g approximately until the throttle is released at 6 s.

The yaw rate plot shows the oversteer due to the rear wheels losing traction - after an uncomfortable jerk at 20 deg/s, the vehicle spins sharply in the direction of the turn. The lateral acceleration also spikes to 0.6 g and levels at about 0.55 g, meaning that the radius decreased (i.e., the turn tightened). The side forces on the outside wheels increase and the inside rear (LR) wheel even lifts off the ground, a common occurrence.

Lift off oversteer is induced when the throttle is lifted while midway through a corner, often by inexperienced drivers who have entered the corner at an excessive speed.

=== Moment of inertia ===
Lift off oversteer is most common with mid-mounted engine, rear-wheel-drive (MR) vehicles. Mid-mounted engine vehicles have a much lower rotational inertia than vehicles with a front-mounted or rear-mounted engine. The lower rotational inertia of mid-mounted engine vehicles causes the vehicle to spin much faster than a front or rear mounted engine vehicle. If unexpected, it can catch the driver off guard when cornering, ultimately leading to loss of control of the vehicle.

== Recovery ==
As in all situations where the vehicle experiences loss of rear tire traction on the road surface, the proper maneuver to recover is to turn the steering wheel in the opposite direction of the spin (Countersteering). e.g. If the front of the vehicle is spinning to the left, countersteering to the right and applying mild throttle will help recover control. More specifically aiming the wheels in the desired direction of travel. In the case of a very violent spin the safest thing to do is turn the wheel so the tires are pointing straight forward with respect to the vehicle. This is often easier to accomplish for inexperienced/panicked drivers.

== Real life instances ==
Lift-off oversteer is often exploited in motorsport – particularly on loose surfaces (e.g. in rallying) – as a method of cornering faster as, when controlled, it has the effect of turning the nose into the apex and the car slightly sideways which allows early application of power on exiting the corner. Formula One driver Jim Clark's late-braking technique exploited the lift-off oversteer characteristics of mid-engined race cars to attain higher cornering speeds. It became standard competition driving technique as an enhancement of the four wheel drift technique that preceded it.

On April 10, 2010, Consumer Reports magazine rated the 2010 Lexus GX 460 SUV a "Don’t Buy: Safety Risk," as their panel of test engineers determined the vehicle was subject to excessive lift-off oversteer during a standardized evaluation for emergency handling. The test simulates scenarios such as transiting a highway exit ramp while traveling with excessive speed.

== See also ==
- Drifting (motorsport)
- Engine braking
