= Scandinavian flick =

Driving technique

Scandinavian flick, showing a car entering at the bottom of the image

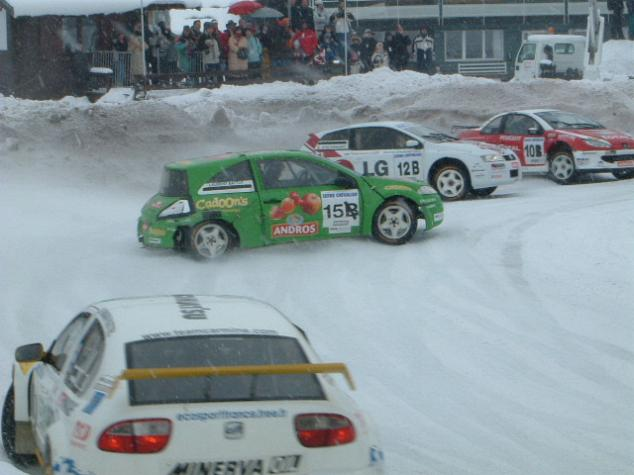
Andros Trophy ice-racers at various points in a right-hand hairpin turn

The Scandinavian flick is a technique used predominantly in ice racing and rallying. The technique induces oversteer using weight transfer to carry a vehicle through a turn while simultaneously reducing speed.

== Origin of the name ==
Beginning in the 1960s, Nordic rally-car drivers popularized the technique. The "flick" part comes from the technique of "flicking" the wheel in a direction opposite of the turn to build up angular momentum.

== Technique ==
Scandinavian flick mechanics

Approaching along the inside of an upcoming turn, the driver steers sharply towards the outside of the turn, then lifts off the throttle and lightly applies the brakes. This causes weight transfer that rotates the car toward the outside of the turn. Then, steering into the turn and releasing the brake pedal while applying full throttle will cause the car to rotate into the corner. Towards the corner exit, the driver may countersteer, while lifting off of the throttle, and reapplying as necessary to maintain the correct exit angle, all in an effort to control oversteer. When properly executed this technique neatly lines the car up for the exit while maintaining momentum.

== Contemporary usage ==
Since the 1990s, most cars produced have been front-wheel drive which are prone to understeer. This makes a vehicle stable at high speed but requires larger steering inputs near the limits of adhesion, especially on low-grip surfaces. Skilled drivers are able to use a maneuver similar to the Scandinavian flick, though with less steering input and control the possible slide by using opposite lock. Since the 2010s, several models of electric vehicles have gone back to rear wheel drive, and this can again change which driving techniques are used in competitive driving.

The ability of a vehicle to handle sudden changes in direction at high speeds without sliding or rolling over is assessed through the so-called moose test. This scenario occurs when the driver is trying to avoid an obstacle (ostensibly a moose, or any other large animal that may appear on the road) in their lane and then returning to the lane to avoid oncoming traffic. The succession of sharp turns in opposite directions combined with lifting off the throttle is exactly how the Scandinavian flick is performed. Since the technique is used at race speeds, it's not normal for a vehicle to start a slide while driving at road speeds.

This technique is commonly used in ice-racing in North America and Europe (e.g. the Andros Trophy). On loose surfaces, contemporary rally drivers tend to rely more on left-foot braking for directional control in cornering FWD cars.

== Cultural references ==
It is frequently used by former racing driver Tiff Needell on the motoring programme Fifth Gear and previously during his time as a presenter on the television show Top Gear.

It was also used in 2002 reboot of Top Gear, in which Richard Hammond tried to achieve the Scandinavian flick whilst cornering in his "lightweight, mid-engined" Suzuki Super Carry. The result was a less than spectacular roll-over to its side. Additionally, it is featured on Top Gear in an episode in which James May hones his rally skills with Mika Häkkinen in the woods and snowy landscape of Finland. It was also used as an episode title for the first episode of the fifth season of The Grand Tour as, "A Scandi Flick". The episode follows the trio as they journey through Norway, Sweden, and Finland. It was also used in The Grand Tour Season 2 Episode 9 during a celebrity segment in which Penn of Penn & Teller attempted the move.

In Initial D First Stage (Anime), the protagonist Takumi Fujiwara used this Scandinavian Flick to corner after overspeed a turn during an impromptu race, and is called an Inertia Drift in the anime. The drift shocked the opponent, Keisuke Takahashi and even felt ashamed that he was beaten by a Toyota Sprinter Trueno AE86. The scene also became an internet meme.

In the 2006 animated movie Cars, protagonist Lightning McQueen is taught the Scandinavian flick by his soon to be mentor Doc Hudson.

== See also ==
- Drifting (motorsport)
- Left-foot braking
- Moose test
- Opposite lock
