= Stunt =

Unusual and difficult physical feat

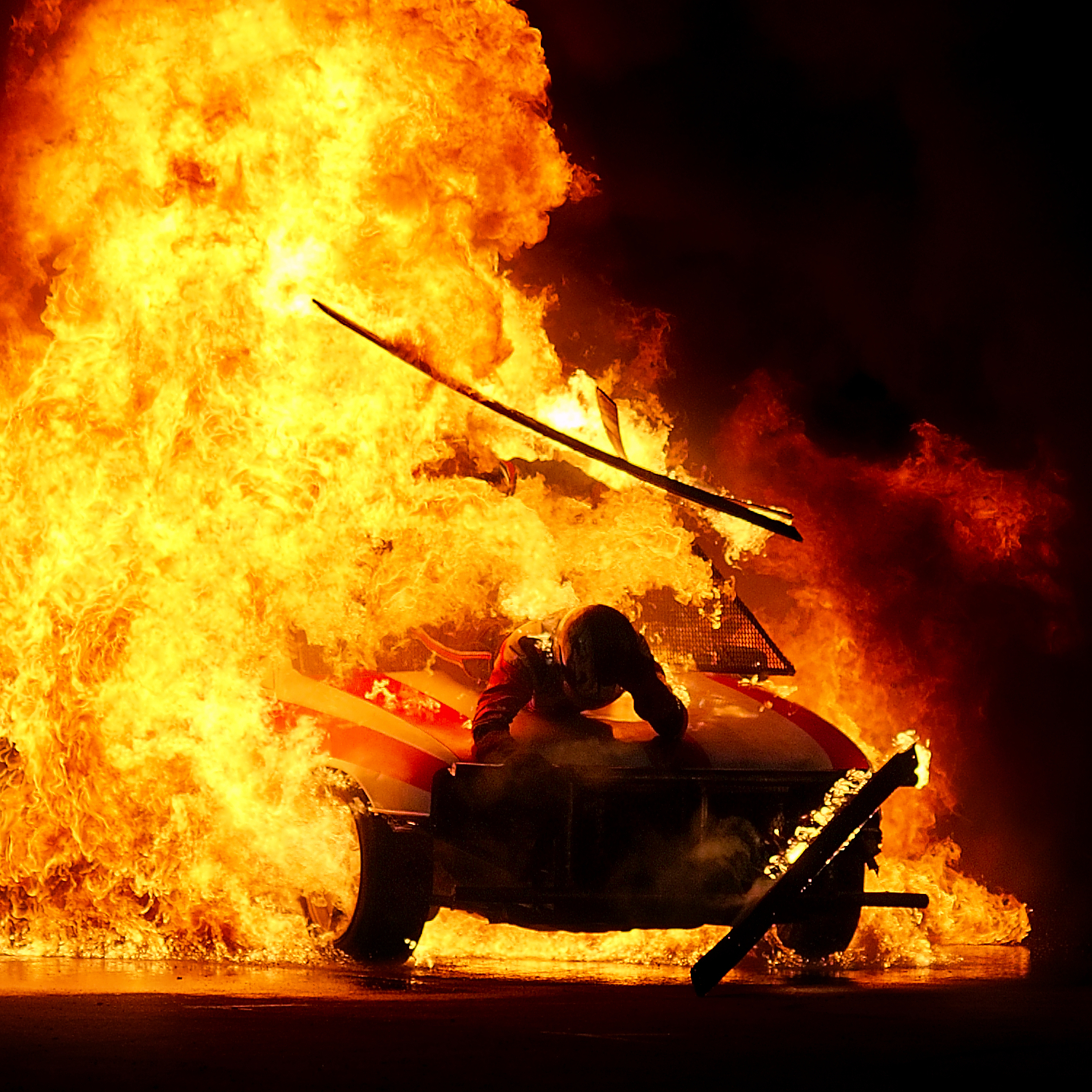
Pyrotechnics stunt exhibition by "Giant Auto Rodéo", Ciney, Belgium

A stunt is an unusual, difficult, dramatic physical feat that may require a special skill, performed for artistic purposes usually for a public audience, as on television or in theaters or cinema. Stunts are a feature of many action films. Before computer-generated imagery special effects, these depictions were limited to the use of models, false perspective and other in-camera effects, unless the creator could find someone willing to carry them out, even such dangerous acts as jumping from car to car in motion or hanging from the edge of a skyscraper: the stunt performer or stunt double.

== Types of stunt effects ==
=== Practical effects ===
One of the most-frequently used practical stunts is stage combat. Although contact is normally avoided, many elements of stage combat, such as sword fighting, martial arts, and acrobatics required contact between performers in order to facilitate the creation of a particular effect, such as noise or physical interaction. Stunt performances are highly choreographed and may be rigorously rehearsed for hours, days and sometimes weeks before a performance. Seasoned professionals will commonly treat a performance as if they have never done it before, since the risks in stunt work are high, every move and position must be correct to reduce risk of injury from accidents. Examples of practical effects include tripping and falling down, high jumps, extreme sporting moves, acrobatics and high diving, spins, gainer falls, "suicide backflips," and other martial arts stunts. Stunt airbags (or "stunt mats"), large deep airbags that may be the size of a small swimming pool, are typically used by professional stunt performers to cushion their landings from staged falls from heights.

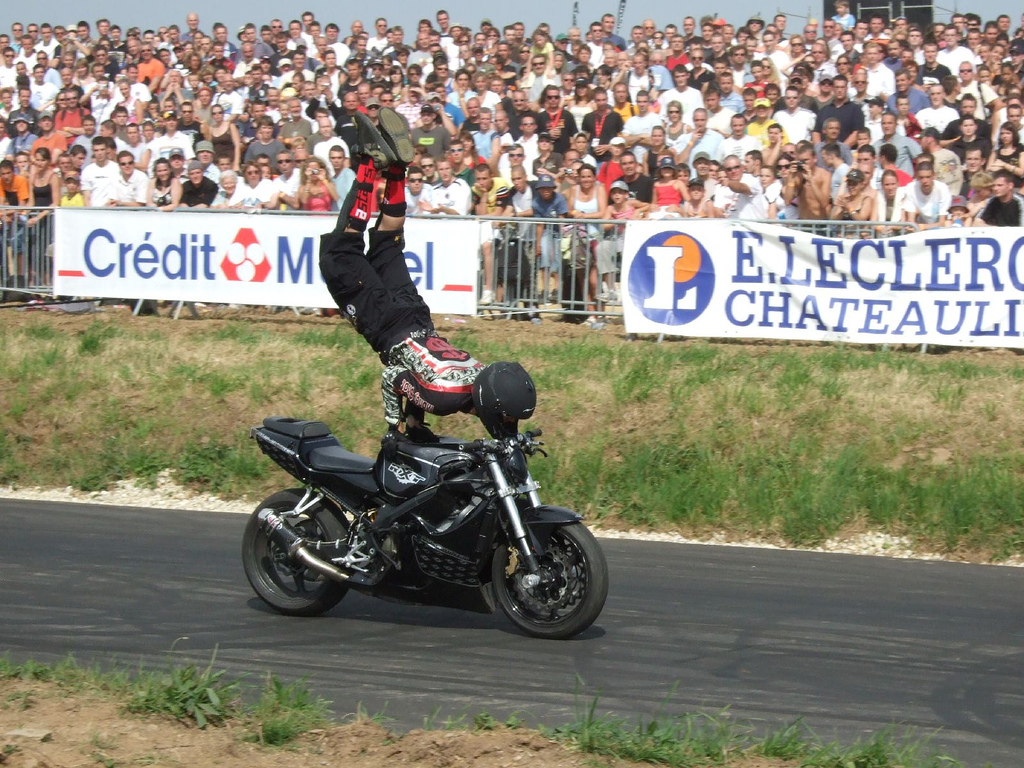
Freestyle & Stunt Show 2007 in Landrévarzec, France

=== Mechanical effects ===
A physical stunt is usually performed with help of mechanics. For example, if the plot requires the hero to jump to a high place, the film crew could put the actor in a special harness, and use aircraft high tension wire to pull them up. Piano wire is sometimes used to fly objects, but an actor is never suspended from it as it is brittle and can break under shock impacts. Hero (2003) and House of Flying Daggers (2004) are examples of wuxia films that use kung-fu and are heavily reliant on wire stunts. The Matrix is an example of extensive wire and rigging work in Western cinema.

=== Vehicular stunts ===
Performers of vehicular stunts require extensive training and may employ specially adapted vehicles. Stunts can be as simple as a handbrake turn, also known as the bootleg turn, or as advanced as car chases, jumps and crashes involving dozens of vehicles. Rémy Julienne is a well known pioneering automotive stunt performer and coordinator. A Guinness Book of World Records holder stunt driver, Bobby Ore, performed in numerous movies and events and holds a world record for longest distance driven on two wheels in a London double decker bus (810 feet).

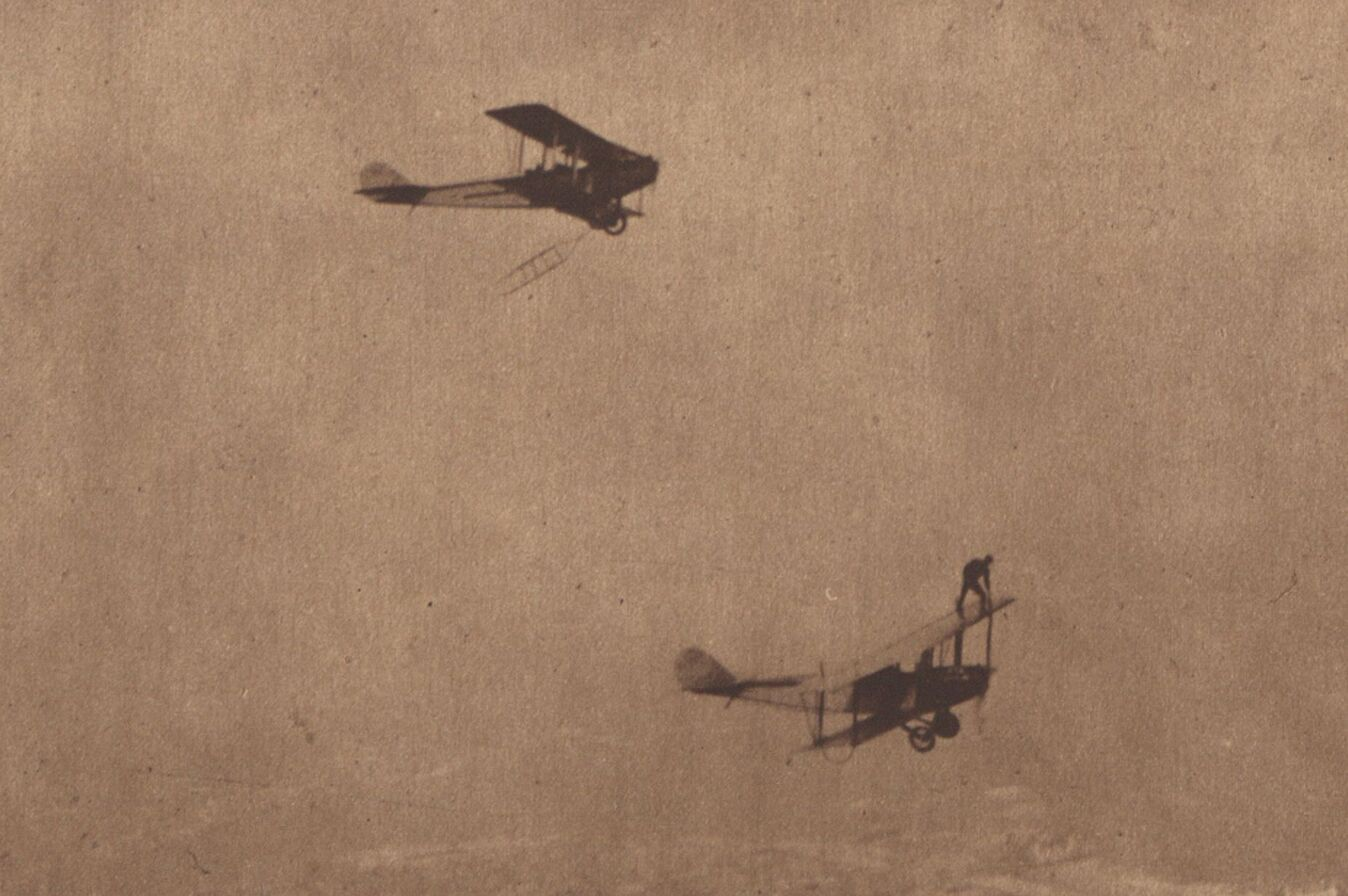
On 1 June 1919, Ormer Locklear waited on one biplane for a second one trailing a rope ladder.

Aviation stunts go back to those performed in balloons in the 18th century. After the advent of powered aircraft in 1903, barnstorming and aerobatics came into existence. Ormer Locklear invented or helped develop many of the basic tricks of stunt flying, which included wing walking and transferring between airplanes in mid-air. Hollywood and the public's fascination with aviation made great demands on stunt pilots, resulting in many injuries and fatalities.

=== Computer-generated effects ===
In the late 20th century stunt men were often placed in dangerous situations less and less as filmmakers turned to relatively inexpensive (and much safer) computer graphics effects using harnesses, fans, blue- or green screens, and a huge array of other devices and digital effects. The Matrix (1999) is an example of a film that extensively enhanced real stunts through CGI post production. The Lord of the Rings film series and the Star Wars prequel films often display stunts that are entirely computer generated. Examples of computer-generated effects include face replacement and wire removal.

== Hong Kong action cinema ==
In 1982, Jackie Chan began experimenting with elaborate stunt action sequences in Dragon Lord, which featured a pyramid fight scene that holds the record for the most takes required for a single scene, with 2900 takes, and the final fight scene where he performs various stunts, including one where he does a back flip off a loft and falls to the lower ground. In 1983, Project A saw the official formation of the Jackie Chan Stunt Team and added elaborate, dangerous stunts to the fights and slapstick humor (at one point, Chan falls from the top of a clock tower through a series of fabric canopies).

Police Story (1985) contained many large-scale action scenes, including an opening sequence featuring a car chase through a shanty town, Chan stopping a double-decker bus with his service revolver and a climactic fight scene in a shopping mall. This final scene earned the film the nickname "Glass Story" by the crew, due to the huge number of panes of sugar glass that were broken. During a stunt in this last scene, in which Chan slides down a pole from several stories up, the lights covering the pole had heated it considerably, resulting in Chan suffering second-degree burns, particularly to his hands, as well as a back injury and dislocation of his pelvis upon landing. Chan performed similarly elaborate stunts in numerous other films, such as several Police Story sequels, Project A Part II, the Armor of God series, Dragons Forever, Drunken Master II, and Rumble in the Bronx among others.

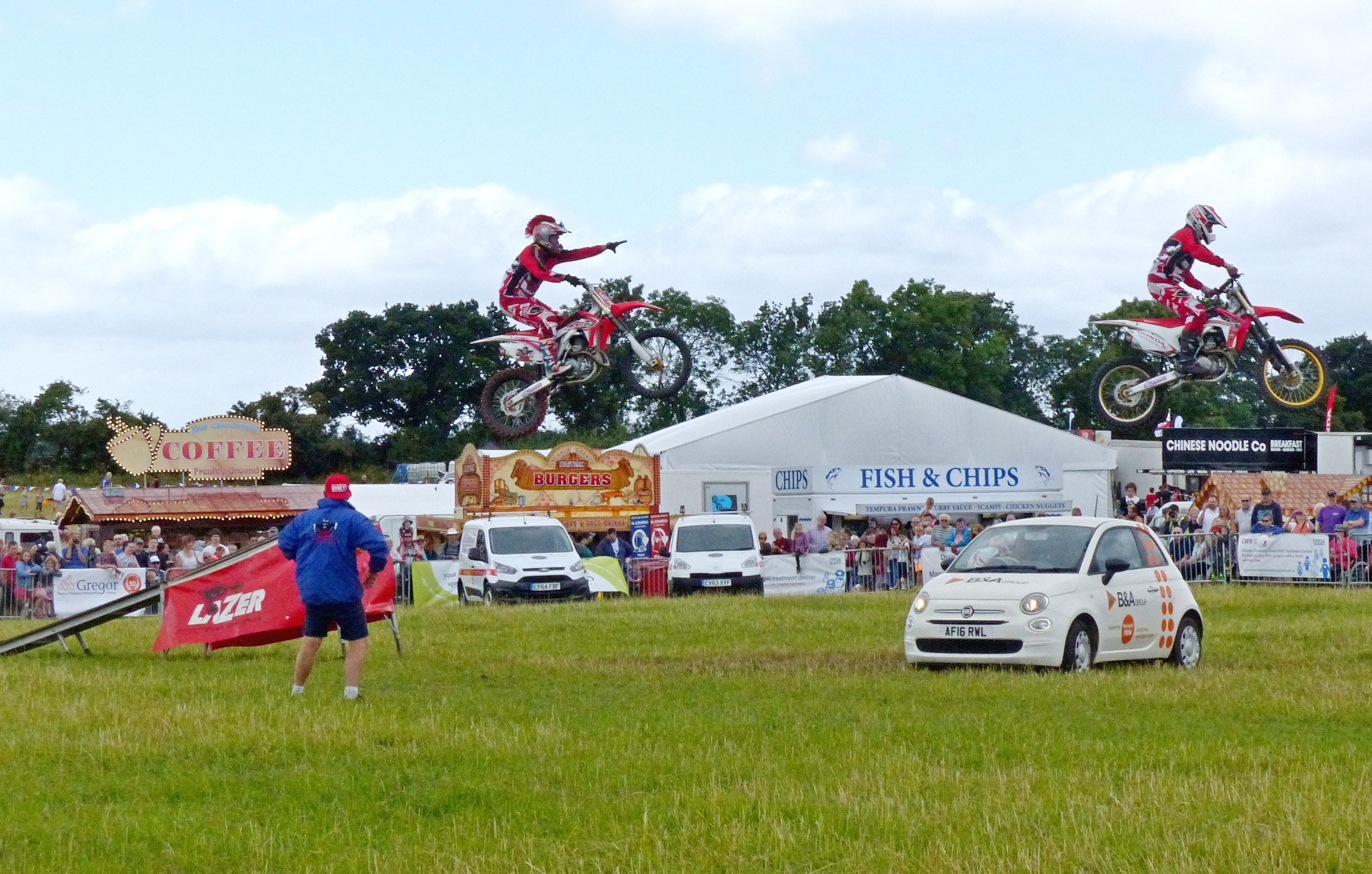
Two motorbikes jump a car at a country fair, England

Other Hong Kong action movie stars who became known for performing elaborate stunts include Chan's Peking Opera School friends Sammo Hung and Yuen Biao, as well as "girls with guns" stars such as Michelle Yeoh and Moon Lee. Other Asian cinema stars also known for performing elaborate stunts include Thai actor Tony Jaa; Indonesian actors Iko Uwais and Yayan Ruhian; and Indian actors Jayan, Akshay Kumar, Vidyut Jammwal and Tiger Shroff.

== Recognition of stunt performers ==
Films such as Hooper and The Stunt Man and the 1980s television show The Fall Guy sought to raise the profile of the stunt performer and debunk the myth that film stars perform all their own stunts. Noted stunt coordinators Hal Needham, Craig R. Baxley, and Vic Armstrong went on to direct the action films The Cannonball Run, Action Jackson, and Joshua Tree. Vic Armstrong became the first stuntman to win both an Academy Award (for developing a descender rig as a safe alternative to airbags) and a BAFTA award (for lifetime achievement in film). But the status of stuntmen in Hollywood is still low; despite the fact that few films of any genre or type could be made without them, stunt performers are still perceived as working mainly in action films. Repeated campaigns for a "Best Stunts" Academy Award have been rejected.

In 2001, the first "World Stunt Awards" were presented in Los Angeles by actor Alec Baldwin. The event had A-list stars presenting the statues to Hollywood's stunt performers. Arnold Schwarzenegger was presented with the first "Lifetime Achievement" award. He presented the awards in 2001. The awards show hands out eight awards: Best Fight, Best Fire Stunt, Best High Work, Best Overall Stunt by a Stunt Man, Best Overall Stunt by a Stunt Woman, Best Speciality Stunt, Best Work with a Vehicle and Best Stunt Coordinator or 2nd Unit Director.

== Equality in stunts ==
In past Hollywood films it was common for men to portray women and white American stunt performers to portray African American performers, in a practice known as "wigging". Veteran stunt man Dave Sharpe, a man of shorter than average height, often doubled for women in film serials of the 1930s and '40s. Veteran stunt performer Jeannie Epper, who doubled for Lynda Carter in Wonder Woman, explained that the situation improved in the 1970s as actresses did not want to be doubled by men, and could be more convincingly doubled by a woman. SAG-AFTRA union rules for stunt performers say that to double an actor of a different gender or race the stunt must be so dangerous that there are no volunteers available of the appropriate gender or race. For example, in A View to a Kill, stuntman B.J. Worth doubled for the black Jamaican actress Grace Jones whose character parachuted off the Eiffel Tower.

== The future of stunt work ==
A backlash against dangerous stunts followed the fatal 42-foot backward fall of Sonja Davis off a building on the set of Vampire in Brooklyn. Despite speculation that developments in computer-generated imagery (CGI) would make stunts unnecessary and reduce stunt performers to the status of body doubles, stunt work has increasingly been made safer and enhanced by CGI effects; nevertheless, stunt performers remain essential to provide a human quality to the action.

== See also ==
- Stunt coordinator
- Stunt performer
- Stunt double
- Motorcycle stunt riding
