= Stance bike =

Customized BMX bike

A stance bike is a heavily modified, stylized BMX bike used in South African youth culture.

== Origins and characteristics ==
The trend evolved in the 2020s from the South African car stance culture and car spinning scene. Teens in Soweto began modifying their BMX bikes with improvised means; lowered frames, chrome parts, flashy paint jobs, or extended rear sections. This gave rise to a hybrid culture between BMX riding, creative design, and street sport.

== Design and technique ==
Modifications include removing brakes or installing extra-long brake cables, fitting oversized rims, shortening or lengthening frame tubes, removing the saddle, adding loudspeakers, and using chrome parts. Some bicycles are designed primarily for “spinning.” Many stance bikes have no saddle and are ridden standing on the pedals.

== Spinning ==
The subculture of "spinning" bicycles emerged from the car spinning subculture. The bikes are elongated to mimic the wheelbase of a car. Simple BMX bikes are heavily modified by completely dismantling the original frames and rebuilding them with a new geometry and appearance. To reduce friction and break traction, the rear tire can be covered with plastic bottles.

== Social significance ==
The movement is seen as a creative form of expression for young people. Since many families can't afford expensive sports equipment, modified bicycles provide an affordable opportunity for physical activity, hands-on learning, and artistic self-fulfillment. Media reports emphasize that this culture gives young people a sense of belonging, a form of recognition, and in some cases even a source of income through repairs, modifications or sales.
