= Opposite lock =

Driving terminology

A diagram showing the use of opposite lock steering with a car driving up and turning to the right. Note the angle of the front wheels where blue indicates right steer, red left steer.

Powerslide simulated using MSC Adams

Opposite lock, also commonly known as countersteer, is a colloquial term used to mean the steering associated with the deliberate use of oversteer to turn a vehicle rapidly without losing momentum. It is typified by the classic rallying style of rear-wheel drive cars, where a car travels around a bend with a large drift angle. The terms "opposite lock" and "counter-steering" refer to the position of the steering wheel during the maneuver, which is turned in the opposite direction to that of the bend.

The technique works best on loose or wet surfaces where the friction between the tires and the road is not too high, but can also be used on asphalt or other surfaces with high friction if the vehicle has enough power to maintain speed.

Before entry to the bend, the car is turned towards the bend slightly, but quickly, so as to cause a rotating motion that induces the rear of the car to slide outwards. Power is applied which applies further sideways movement. At the same time, opposite lock steering is applied to keep the car on the desired course. As the car reaches the bend it will have already turned through most of the needed angle, traveling sideways and losing some speed as a result. A smooth application of power at this point will accelerate the car into the bend and then through it, gradually removing the sideways component of travel.

For front-wheel drive vehicles, there is much less natural tendency for the rear wheels to break traction because they are not transmitting power, so often such vehicles are set up with a strong bias to the rear brakes, allowing the driver to control traction using the brake pedal. The brake balance (front/rear braking force) may be continually controllable by the driver using a hand lever. Left-foot braking is the favored technique for using opposite lock in a front drive vehicle.

A related technique is the handbrake turn, in which the rear wheels are deliberately locked in order to break the friction between the tires and the road, allowing the car to be spun around a very tight bend or junction, etc.

== See also ==
- Drifting (motorsport)
- Scandinavian flick
