= Sideshow (automobile exhibition) =

Informal automotive skills event

A sideshow in San Jose, 2021.

A sideshow (so-called in the San Francisco Bay Area; a street takeover in the Los Angeles area) is an informal and often illegal demonstration of automotive stunts now often held in vacant lots and public intersections, originally seen in the East Bay region of the San Francisco Bay Area, United States. Sideshows first appeared in Oakland, California, in the 1980s as informal social gatherings of Bay Area youth.

== History ==
Sideshows first emerged on the streets of Oakland, California during the mid-1980s. The first sideshows were originally ad hoc carshows, where people would congregate in the Eastmont Mall or Foothill Square parking lot. The original intent of the sideshows at this time was for people to show off their cars, typically 1960s- and 1970s-made muscle cars. Sideshows became the alternative hot spot for those too young to gain entrance into 21-and-over nightclubs and had outgrown the parking lots of Eastmont Mall and Foothill Square. They were made even more popular throughout the 1990s with such songs as Bay Area rapper Richie Rich's "Sideshow" anthem: "Down Bancroft / To the light / Let me warm it up, I hit a donut tight / Chevy on my side / Windows straight tinted / He got hype when he saw me spinnin’ / I’m up outta there, sideways to the next light."

In the 21st century, sideshows have become increasingly prevalent in other cities, such as Los Angeles, Orlando, Boston and in multiple cities in Texas, despite the danger that they pose to the public. These sideshows are now considerably more intense than during their peak in the 1980s and 1990s. Sideshows in the 21st century have increasingly involved stolen cars, with cars such as the Infiniti G-Line, seventh-generation Dodge Charger, third-generation Dodge Challenger, and fifth and sixth-generation Chevrolet Camaro being common targets for car thieves. In some cases, a likely stolen car is set on fire to erase evidence.

== Activities ==
Common activities at sideshows include screeching tires, doughnuts and ghostriding. The latter involves driving a car, opening the door and climbing out, sometimes onto the hood, sometimes standing or dancing next to the car while it continues to roll. Violent incidents, including fights and shootings, sometimes occur at the events.

== Law enforcement ==
To crack down on illegal sideshows, the Oakland Police Department opened a police substation at Eastmont Mall and set up "No Cruising Zones" along International Boulevard. In efforts to keep the events from spreading west to Downtown Oakland, an additional no cruising law was established along Grand Avenue and Lakeshore Avenue in 1996. The phenomenon is most strongly associated with the city of Oakland (the birthplace of the sideshow), with the events there often being attended by those in the hip hop community. Such events are promoted in local rap by artists including E-40.

On June 8, 2005, the Oakland City Council narrowly defeated a measure (pushed by then-mayor Jerry Brown) which would have subjected spectators at sideshows to criminal sanctions, such as fines and jail terms. Drivers face various penalties, including having their cars impounded. On April 30, 2019, the San Jose City Council passed an ordinance making spectators punishable with a fine of up to $1,000 and 6 months in jail.

In June of 2023, Oakland City Council passed an ordinance making it a misdemeanor to organize, facilitate or promote sideshows. If found guilty, persons convicted under the law could receive up to a six month sentence in the Alameda county jail or a fine of $1,000 to $5,000, with increased fines for repeat violations.

Contemporaneously, the Oakland Police Department and City of Oakland Department of Transportation jointly initiated a program to install traffic-calming engineering features such as speed bumps at twelve locations where sideshows are commonly held, most of them along MacArthur Boulevard and Foothill Boulevard.

On February 23, 2023, the state of Texas and Governor Greg Abbott launched a task force to address sideshows following numerous incidents that arose in Dallas-Fort Worth, Houston and Austin. The latter garnered statewide attention when one takeover saw participants repel police officers of the Austin Police Department (APD), who arrived over twenty minutes late, to disperse and potentially arrest both the drivers and spectators. Texas police groups like the Combined Law Enforcement Associations of Texas and Austin mayor Kirk Watson said they approved Abbott’s state task force announcement, with Watson calling the sideshows "lawless and wrong." By the following month, seventeen people associated with the Austin sideshow were apprehended by the APD and facing charges, ranging from misdemeanors for reckless driving to felonies for organized crime. Steve McCraw, the director of the Texas Department of Public Safety who is working with both the APD and Travis County District Attorney José Garza, warned the street takeovers are not isolated to Austin and are occurring statewide. He further stated that those who participate in the sideshows, even as a spectator, would be arrested: "If you're involved in a street takeover, we're certainly going after you. We're going after your vehicle. You'll [...] be arrested, prosecuted, your vehicle seized, and [we're] also going after your driver's license, as well."

On June 10, 2023, a street takeover in the North Richland Hills area of Tarrant County, Texas, led police into a chase that ended in a crash. After making doughnuts at an intersection, the driver sped off once police arrived. Video footage captured shows a passenger hanging out the side of the window before jumping off as the police began to chase the driver. The driver then recklessly drove through winding streets until crashing into a company van owned by a Watauga resident. The driver was later arrested. Further information revealed the driver was nineteen years old and had no insurance.

On June 11, 2023, Oklahoma City police arrested over 110 people involved in a street takeover in the parking lot of a warehouse at a business complex. The number of automobiles present varied from 75 to 100, and more than 50 of them were impounded. The police were tipped off about the takeover dating back to early May and that other gatherings had happened on several occasions. Most of the charges that were implemented were related to trespassing on private property since the drivers involved disregarded the "No Trespassing" signs and security cameras that were at the location.

On August 2, 2023, Texas Governor Greg Abbott signed two bills into law that would crack down on sideshows. One bill, House Bill 2899, went into effect, allowing cars involved in a street takeover to be immediately removed and impounded. The other bill, House Bill 1442, will take effect on September 1 and plans to have law enforcement and prosecutors pursue organized street racing and takeover events statewide. Additionally, the latter bill will add two new offenses to the organized criminal activity statute: reckless driving exhibition and racing on a highway. Law enforcement can also seize vehicles and contraband used in the commission of the crimes. Abbott was joined by Fort Worth Mayor Mattie Parker, Fort Worth Police Chief Neil Noakes, Tarrant County Sheriff Bill Weybourn, and Texas Department of Public Safety Director Steven McCraw. "Both of these laws will safeguard Texans from dangerous and illegal street racing," Abbott said in the press conference. "Texas is a law and order state. As long as I am governor, we will back the blue, protect our citizens, and ensure that law enforcement have the tools they need to secure our streets." Parker said the takeovers were "not victimless crimes" and that "[...] oftentimes, lives are lost."

== See also ==
- Bike Life – A Harlem counter-culture
- Hyphy – San Francisco Bay Area slang meaning "hyperactive"
- Tafheet – Illegal sideshow-like automotive subculture in Saudi Arabia
