= Doughnut (driving) =

Maneuver performed while driving a vehicle

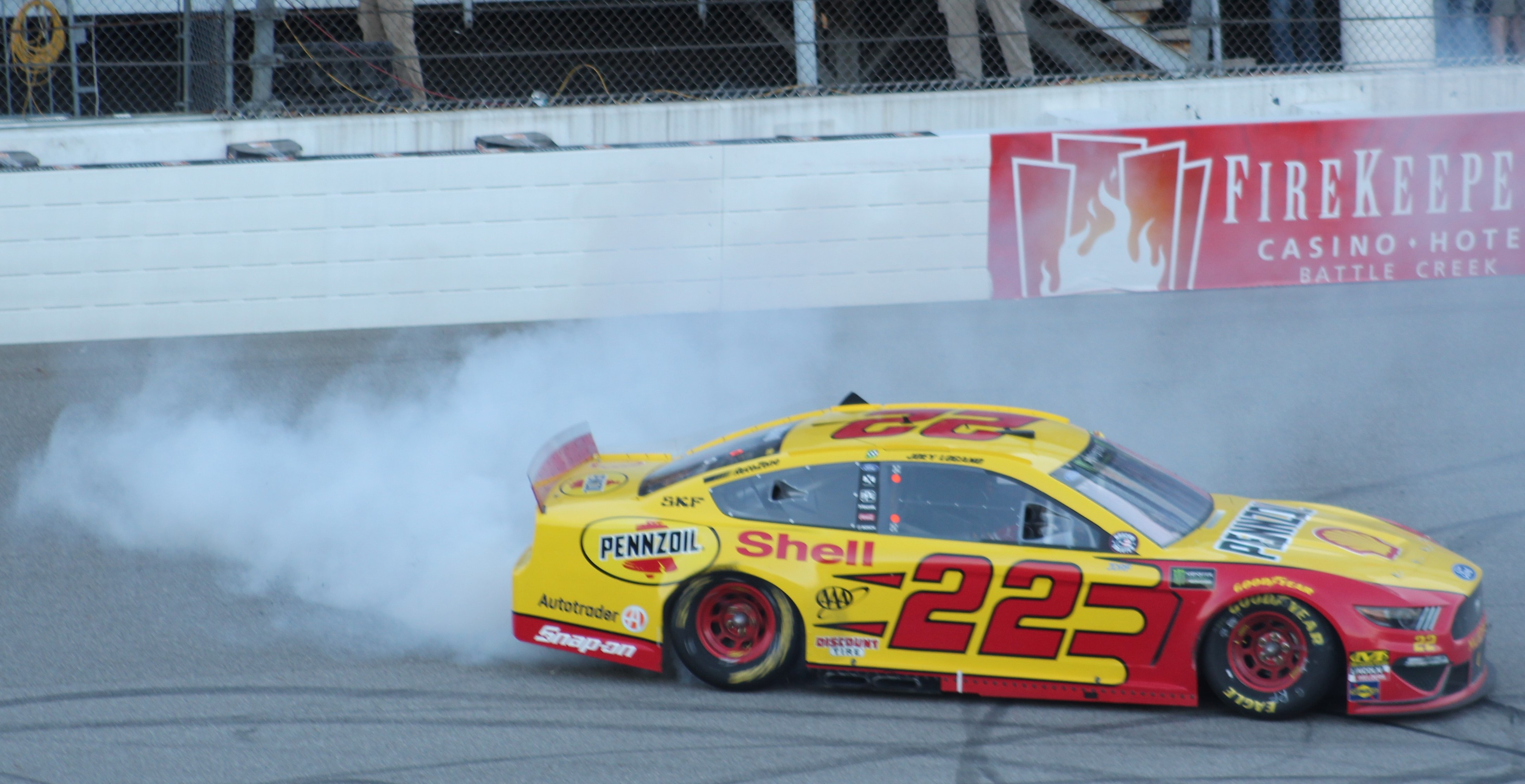
Joey Logano performs a doughnut at the end of the 2019 FireKeepers Casino 400 after he won the race

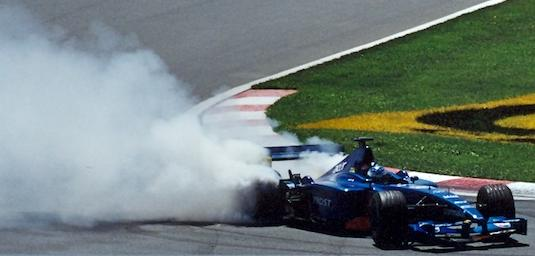
Jean Alesi performs a doughnut at the end of the 2001 Canadian Grand Prix after a fifth place finish

Jean Ragnotti performs a doughnut at the exhibition on Masaryk Circuit within 2010 World Series by Renault in Brno

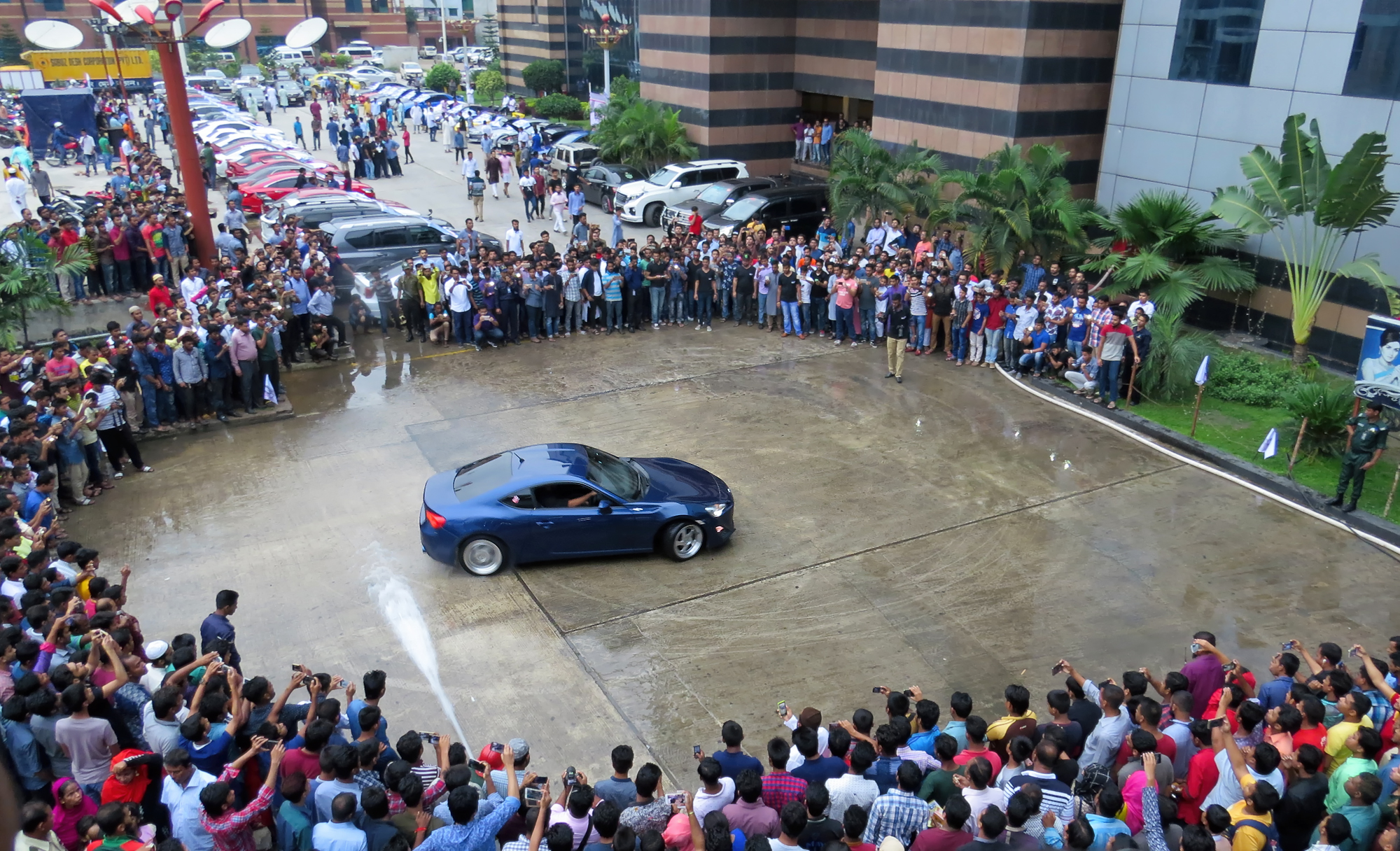
Doing the donut on wet pavement in Bangladesh

A doughnut (or donut) is a vehicle driving maneuver characterized by an intentional and sustained oversteer action. The maneuver entails rotating the rear or front of the vehicle around the opposite set of wheels in a continuous motion. This creates a circular skid-mark pattern of vulcanized rubber on the pavement and typically generates significant tire smoke due to friction. While common in motorsports and stunt driving, the maneuver is also associated with illegal recreational activities on public roads such as "street drifting" and "sideshows".

== Origins ==
The doughnut has its roots in the earliest days of automotive history; automotive historians note that the maneuver could be accomplished even in a Ford Model T. Historically, performing doughnuts in empty parking lots has been described as a "rite of passage" for young drivers to demonstrate vehicle control.

In the United States, particularly in the Midwest, the maneuver is colloquially known as "whippin' shitties." In Australia, similar maneuvers performed specifically in dust or mud are referred to as "circle work."

== Motorsport ==
The doughnut gained widespread popularity as a victory celebration in professional racing during the mid-1990s.

NASCAR: While Ron Hornaday Jr. performed the maneuver earlier in 1995 in the SuperTruck Series, it was Jeff Gordon's celebration after winning the 1995 NASCAR Cup Series championship that popularized it. This has since been performed by other drivers such as Dale Earnhardt (after his 1998 Daytona 500 win) and Tony Stewart.

Formula racing: Alex Zanardi performed doughnuts after the 1997 Long Beach Grand Prix to thank the fans, a gesture he repeated throughout his career. FIA regulations regarding the longevity of engines and transmissions typically restrict doughnut celebrations to the final race of the season, aiming to avoid mechanical penalties or failures during the competitive year.

== Mechanics ==
The ease of performing a doughnut depends heavily on the coefficient of friction between the tires and the surface.

Doughnuts are more easily initiated on "loose" surfaces such as dirt, gravel, or wet pavement. On frozen surfaces (such as snow and ice), the reduced traction allows for maneuvering with less mechanical strain, making it a preferred environment for rally drivers to practice car control.

The Guinness World Record for the most consecutive doughnuts in a car is 280, achieved by Jamie Morrow (UK) driving a Westfield Sport on September 4, 2011.

== Cultural depictions ==
The maneuver appears in media as a symbol of rebellion or youth culture.

An example is the 1979 movie Mad Max which includes a motorcycle stunt rider creating a "donut" burnout and then a wheelie.

The music video for Eminem's 2000 song "The Real Slim Shady" features a blue 1978 AMC Pacer performing doughnuts in an empty parking lot. Critics have noted that this imagery depicts the "petty acts of rebellion" central to the song's themes of suburban teenage restlessness.

The 2006 film The Fast and the Furious: Tokyo Drift has a donut performance on a empty intersection around a car with two women. It is a method to meet girls.

== Hazards ==
Performing doughnuts on public roads is illegal in most jurisdictions, typically classified under "reckless driving" or "exhibition of speed."

The maneuver carries several mechanical and property risks. It places extreme stress on the vehicle's drivetrain, differential, and suspension components, which can lead to catastrophic mechanical failure. High friction causes rapid tire wear and heat buildup, increasing the risk of a sudden blowout. The loss of lateral stability during the spin can result in vehicle rollovers or collisions if the tires suddenly regain grip (a "high-side" event). The maneuver may also cause crashes and destruction of property.

== See also ==
- Drifting (motorsport)
- Burnout
