= Jackknifing =

Folding of an articulated vehicle

These diagrams illustrate possible scenarios when driving a truck on a slippery road surface. Jackknifing is depicted in image 3.

Jackknifing is the folding of an articulated vehicle so that it resembles the acute angle of a folding pocket knife. If a vehicle towing a trailer skids, the trailer can push the towing vehicle from behind, causing it to spin around and face backward. This may be caused by equipment failure, improper braking, or adverse road conditions such as an icy road surface. In extreme circumstances, a driver may deliberately attempt to jackknife the vehicle to halt it after brake failure.

== Trailer swing ==
When a trailer skids to one side, this is known as a trailer swing or trailer slew. This can occur on a slippery road surface, often where there is a cant. This is not the same as jackknifing and is not as serious, as the trailer will move back into line as the vehicle continues forwards. The driver must be aware, however, that the trailer could slide up against parked cars or a guard rail, or that the wheels could slide into a ditch. This situation can occur especially when the trailer is empty or lightly loaded, and weather conditions cause violent gusts of crosswind.

== Anti-jackknife devices ==
One system with limited success was a device that mechanically limited the angle at which a trailer could swing. A much more successful system was to fit the tractor with anti-lock brakes. Fitted originally to airplanes in the 1950s, anti-lock brakes have significantly reduced the number of heavy-vehicle accidents. Electronic brakeforce distribution varies the pressure to the rear brakes during heavy loads or hard braking, enhancing driver control. Tractors were once commonly fitted with a lever in the cab to operate the trailer brakes (a trolley brake). The vehicle could be slowed or stopped using only the trailer brakes. Theoretically, this was a guaranteed way to prevent jackknifing; however, frequent use of the trailer brakes alone caused them to overheat and fade while the tractor brakes remained fresh. In the event of an emergency stop, the driver, applying the foot brake, could cause the trailer to jackknife because the tractor brakes lock while the trailer brakes are ineffective due to previous overheating. Trolley brakes largely disappeared from tractor units in North America in the 1980s and 1990s. An alternative to having a trailer brake lever in the cab is to fit the trailer with an electromagnetic brake.

== See also ==
- Aquaplaning
- Black ice
- Fishtailing
- Underride guard
- T-boning
