= Fishtailing =

Vehicle handling problem

Diagram of a car undergoing fishtailing.

Video of a car fishtailing or drifting on the street of Riia maantee in Tartu, Estonia (December 2021)

Fishtailing is a vehicle handling problem which occurs when the rear wheels lose traction, resulting in oversteer. This can be caused by low-friction surfaces (sand, gravel, rain, snow, ice, etc.). Rear-drive vehicles with sufficient power can induce this loss of traction on any surface, which is called power-oversteer.

== Mechanics and causes ==
=== Accidental fishtailing ===
During fishtailing, the rear end of the car skids to one side, which must be offset by the driver counter-steering, which is turning the front wheels in the same direction as the skid, (e.g. left if the rear swings left) and reducing engine power. Over-correction will result in a skid in the opposite direction; hence the name. Without a proper driver's reaction, the fishtailing vehicle will spin completely.

Friction is the main reason this action is effective. If a car is moving across a surface in any direction other than the direction it is pointed, it is skidding (or sliding), and a sideways load is being imposed against the tires. This causes a lot of friction, even if the tires are allowed to rotate freely.

The ability of the rear suspension to keep tires in contact with, and perpendicular to the road is also a key factor in the amount of grip available through the rear axle. For example, a live beam axle suspension will have far less grip on a bumpy road than an independent rear suspension, due to its far greater unsprung weight and forces from one wheel being transmitted through the axle to the other wheel, leading to the tire being out of contact with the road surface more of the time.

=== PIT maneuver ===
Fishtailing may be the result of the police pursuit technique called the PIT maneuver, in which the driver of a pursuing vehicle deliberately induces directional instability in a pursued vehicle with the intent of spinning it off the road.

== Solutions ==
By turning the front wheels into the direction of the skid, the front wheels will become aligned with the direction of travel. The side load will no longer be imposed against the front tires, and they will then roll freely to match the speed of the vehicle. This reduces the friction between the front tires and the surface. The rear tires will still be sliding sideways, and the greater friction that exists will cause the back end to trail directly behind the front end, similar to a shuttlecock in flight; thus the car straightens out. As the car straightens, the front wheels must be kept aligned with the direction the vehicle is moving, not the direction it is pointed, to keep the friction of the front tires at or below the friction of the rear tires, or a skid in the opposite direction will quickly develop.

Most modern rear-wheel-drive cars solve this problem by using a form of traction control, such as anti-lock brakes, which limits engine power when fishtailing occurs.

Similar behavior is evident during heavy braking in all types of road vehicles due to weight transfer to the front. This can be mitigated by re-proportioning the braking forces (more to the front, less to the rear) to keep the rear wheels from locking up.

== See also ==
- Aquaplaning
- Black ice
- Doughnut (driving)
- Drifting
- Jackknifing
- Speed wobble
- Hydroplaning
