= Drifting (motorsport) =

Driving technique

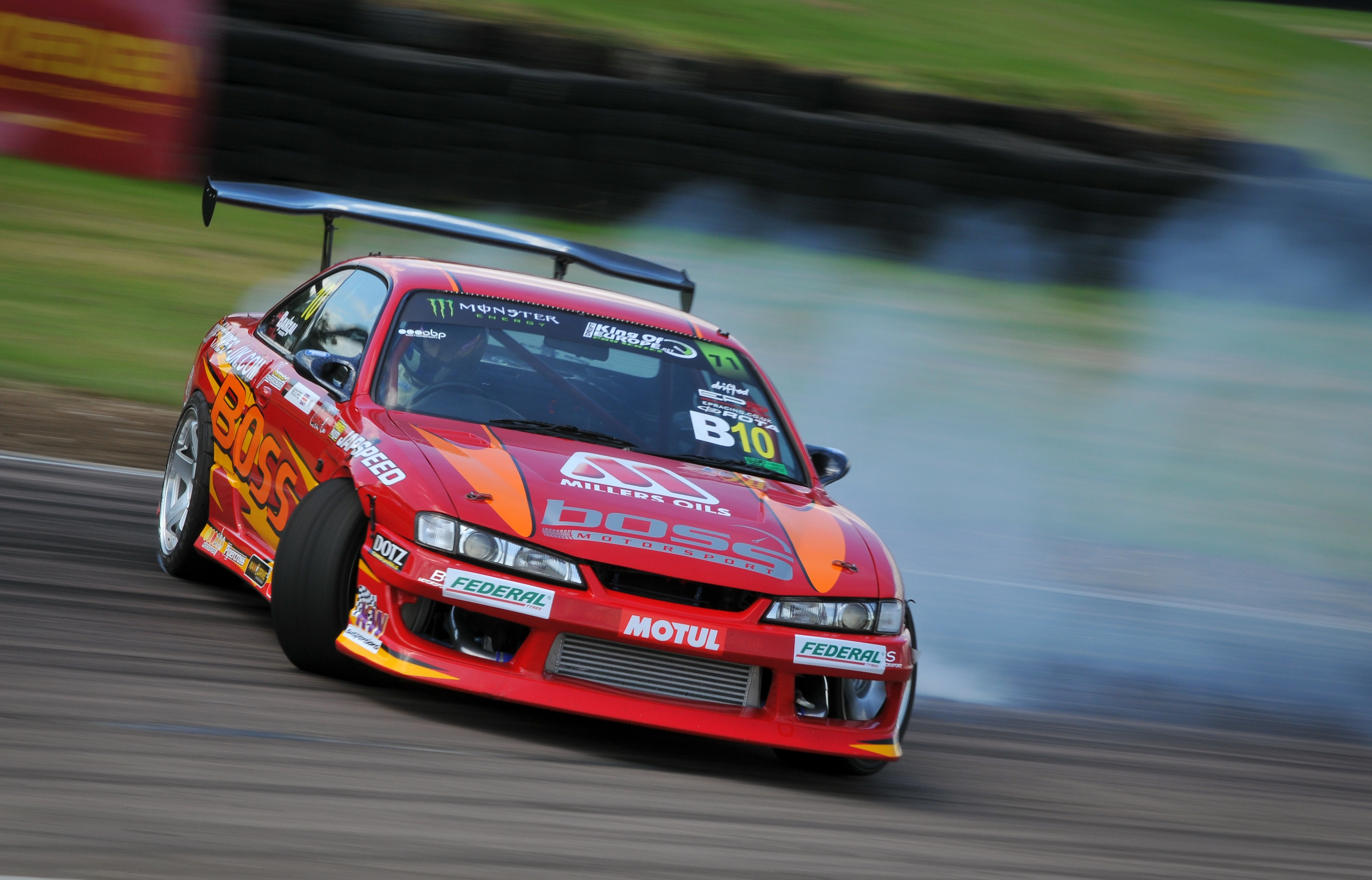
Steve Moore drifting his Nissan Silvia around Lydden Hill at King of Europe Round 3 (2014)

Video of drifting

Drifting is a driving technique where the driver purposely oversteers, with loss of traction, while maintaining control and driving the car through the entirety of a corner or a turn. The technique causes the rear slip angle to exceed the front slip angle usually to such an extent that often the front wheels are pointing in the opposite direction to the turn (e.g. car is turning left, wheels are pointed right or vice versa, also known as opposite lock or counter-steering). Drifting is traditionally performed using four methods: clutch kicking (where the clutch is rapidly disengaged and re-engaged with the intention of upsetting the grip of the rear wheels), a power-oversteer (applying excessive throttle to induce oversteer), weight transfer (using techniques such as the Scandinavian flick or lift-off oversteer), and employing a handbrake turn. This sense of drift is not to be confused with the four wheel drift, a classic cornering technique established in Grand Prix and sports car racing.

As a motoring discipline, drifting competitions were first popularized in Japan in the 1970s and further popularized by the 1995 manga series Initial D. Drifting competitions are held worldwide and are judged according to the speed, angle, showmanship, and line taken through a corner or set of corners.

== History ==
=== Origin ===
Famous motorcyclist turned driver Kunimitsu Takahashi was the foremost creator of drifting techniques in the 1970s. This earned him several championships and a legion of fans who enjoyed the spectacle of smoking tires. The bias-ply racing tires of the 1960s–1980s lent themselves to driving styles with a high slip angle. As professional racers in Japan drove this way, so did street racers.

Keiichi Tsuchiya, known as the "Drift King" (ドリフトキング, Dorifuto Kingu), became particularly interested in Takahashi's drift techniques. Tsuchiya began practicing his drifting skills on the mountain roads of Japan, and quickly gained a reputation amongst the racing crowd. In 1987, several popular car magazines and tuning garages agreed to produce a video of Tsuchiya's drifting skills. The video, known as Pluspy, became a hit and inspired many of the professional drifting drivers on the circuits today. In 1988, alongside Option magazine founder and chief editor Daijiro Inada, he helped to organize one of the first events specifically for drifting called the Ikaten (short for Ikasu Hashiriya Team Tengoku). He has also drifted through every turn in Tsukuba Circuit.

=== Popularity ===
One of the earliest recorded drift events outside Japan took place in 1996 at Willow Springs Raceway in Willow Springs, California, hosted by the Japanese drifting magazine and organization Option. Daijiro Inada (founder of the Japanese D1 Grand Prix), the NHRA Funny Car drag racer Kenji Okazaki, and Keiichi Tsuchiya gave demonstrations in a Nissan 180SX that the magazine had brought over from Japan. Entrants included Rhys Millen and Bryan Norris. Drifting has since exploded into a form of motorsport in North America, Australia, Asia and Europe. Grassroots drifting has seen a huge increase in popularity in the 21st century.

In 2002, Grip Video teamed up with Signal Auto and Battle Version to host an official drift competition and demonstration in Hawaii at Hawaii Raceway Park. Japanese D1 Grand Prix driver Fumiaki Komatsu (known as Drifter X) demonstrated D1 level drifting in Signal Auto’s 180SX

Ken Miyoshi was one of the first to bring drifting to United States with Drift Showoff events in early 2003.

Drifting has evolved into a competitive sport where drivers compete (almost exclusively in rear-wheel-drive cars) to earn points from judges based on various factors. At the top levels of competition, the D1 Grand Prix in Japan pioneered the sport in 2001. Other events such as Drift Games Extreme (formally known as the IDC — Irish Drift Championship) in Ireland, Formula D in the United States, Drift Allstars, King of Europe, Drift Masters and the British Drift Championship in Europe, WDS in China, RDS in Russia, Formula Drift Asia in the Malaysia/Singapore/Thailand/Indonesia/Philippines, NZ Drift Series in New Zealand, the Australian Drifting Grand Prix, Spec - D Drift Series in Western Canada and the Greek Drift Championship (Drift Wars) have come along to further expand it into a legitimate motorsport worldwide. Drivers within these series are able to keep their cars sliding for extended periods of time, often linking several turns.

== Drift competition ==
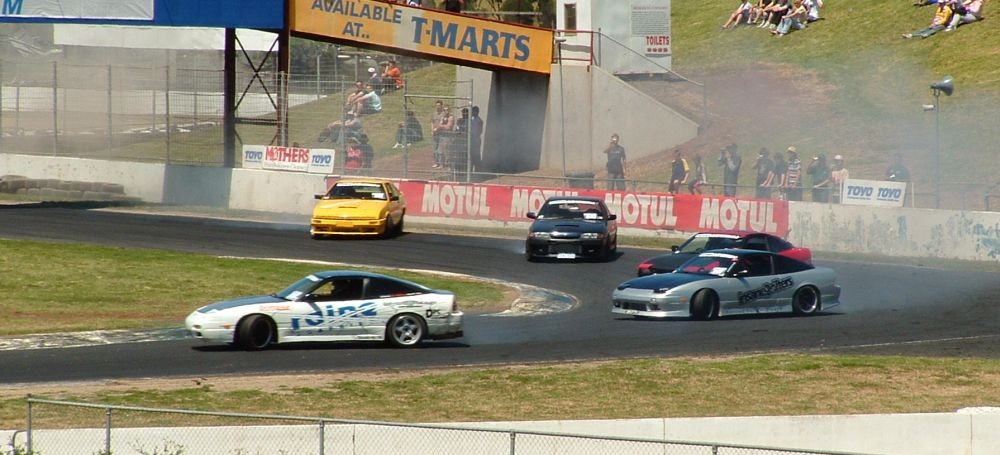
Team Drift Competition in Melbourne

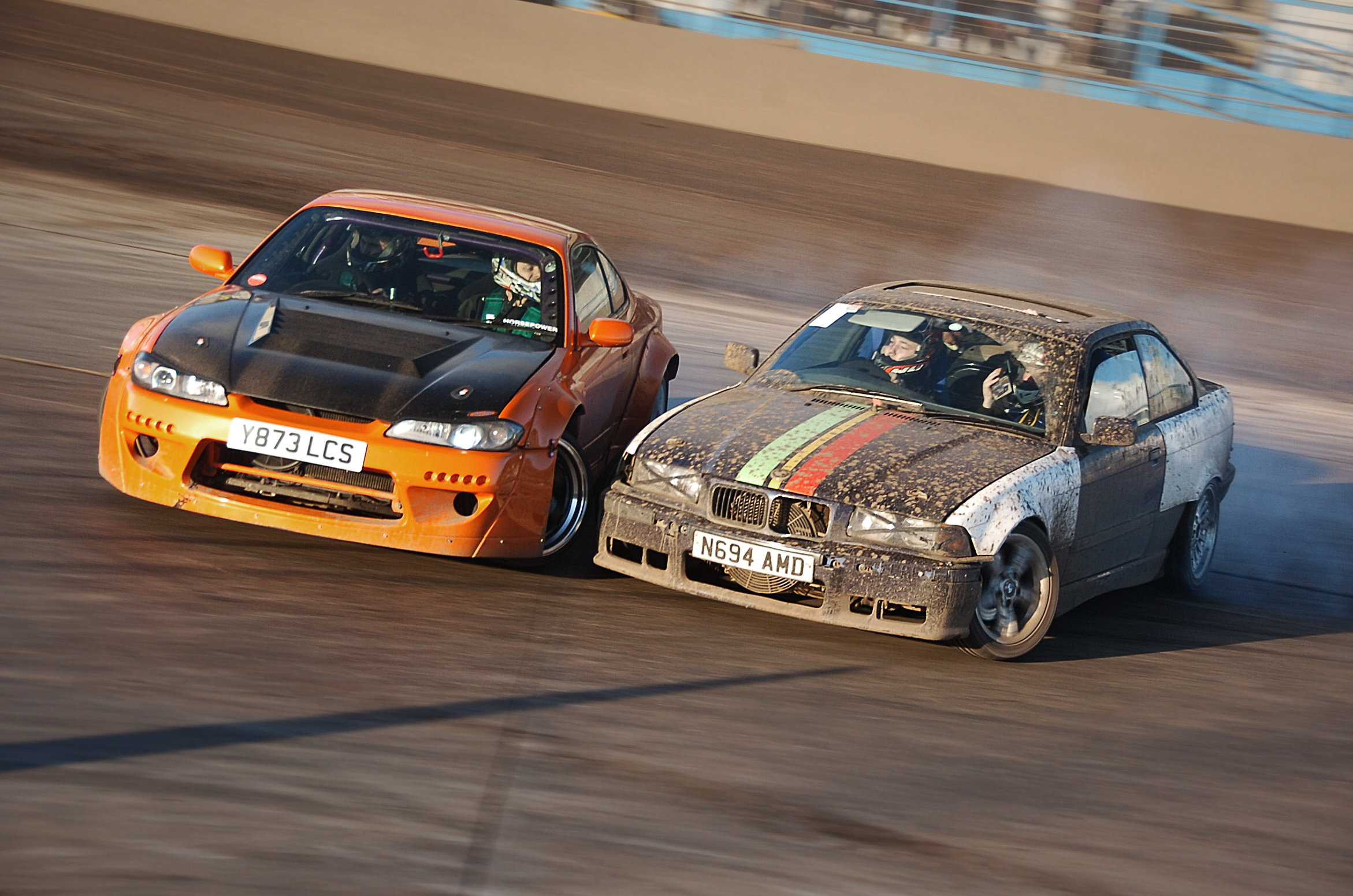
A Nissan Silvia S15 and a BMW E36 tandem drifting

Drifting as an officially sanctioned motorsport competition was initially popularized with the D1 Grand Prix in Japan, which began in 2001 and helped establish judging standards and competition guidelines. Judging takes place on just a small part of the circuit, a few linking corners that provide good viewing, and opportunities for drifting. The rest of the circuit is irrelevant, but it pertains to controlling the temperature of the tires and setting the car up for the first judged corner. In tandem passes, the lead driver (in the lead car, Senko) often feints their entry to the first corner to upset the chase driver (in the chase car, Atooi); however, in some European series, this practice is frowned upon by judges and considered foul play, resulting in deduction of points.

There are typically two sessions – a qualifying or practice session, and a final session. In qualifying sessions, referred to as "solo runs" (単走, tansō), drifters get individual passes in front of judges (who may or may not be the final judges) to try to make the final 16. This is often on the day preceding the final.

The finals are tandem passes called "chases" (追走, tsuisō). Drivers are paired off, and each heat comprises two passes, with each driver taking a turn to lead. The best of the eight heats go to the next four, to the next two, to the final. The passes are judged as explained above; however, there are some provisos such as:

- Overtaking the lead car under drift conditions is frowned upon even if the chasing car doesn't interrupt the lead car's drift.
- Overtaking the lead car under grip conditions automatically forfeits a pass.
- Spinning forfeits a pass, unless the other driver also spins.
- Increasing the lead under drift conditions helps to win a pass.
- Maintaining a close gap while chasing under drift conditions helps to win a pass.
- The level of smoke from the tires is also a factor.

Points are awarded for each pass, and usually, one driver prevails. Sometimes, the judges cannot agree, or cannot decide, or a crowd vocally disagrees with the judge's decision. In such cases, more passes may be run until a winner is produced. On occasion, mechanical failure determines the battle's outcome, either during or preceding a heat. If a car cannot enter a tandem battle, the remaining entrant (who automatically advances) will give a solo demonstration pass. In the event of apparently close or tied runs, crowds often demonstrate their desire for another run with chants of 'one more time'.

Commitment is about how much throttle the driver applies, and the confidence and dedication the driver shows when approaching track edges and barriers. The higher the rate-to-angle, the more speed and angle a driver can carry through the course. In addition, the fewer corrections they apply through the course and the closer they drive to the track edges or barriers, the higher their style score.

=== Outside Japan ===
There is some regional variation. For example, in Australia, the chase car is judged on how accurately it emulates the drift of the lead car, as opposed to being judged on its own merit — this is only taken into consideration by the judges if the lead car is on the appropriate racing line. Other variations of the tansō/tsuisō and the tansō-only method is multi-car group judging, seen in Drift Tengoku videos where the four-car team is judged in groups.

The D1GP drift series has been prototyping and fine-tuning an electronic judging system based on custom sensors that record and transmit car data to a computer that judges the run. This system is also being tested in some European series. It is designed to remove subjectivity and/or predisposition of judges. Usually the track for such a system is broken up into several sections (usually three) and the system automatically generates scores based on speed, angle and fluidity of the driver in each section, combining the scores for the final score. In certain situations judges can change or overrule a score, which happens, though rarely.

Formula Drift is the top United States Drifting series. Its judging style for competition is based on line, angle, and speed. When judging for line the driver is judged based on their ability to stay on the line set in place by the judges. Points are allocated to outside zones and inner clips, and are also allocated to touch and go areas. Angle is the drivers ability to maintain a high level of angle that will be set by the angle judge in the drivers meeting. Style is judged based on three areas of focus; initiation, fluidity, and commitment. Initiation is based on how early and smooth the driver initiates into a drift. Fluidity is how smooth the driver drives from lock to lock, high angles of drift, and just overall smoothness on the track. Commitment is judged on consistent throttle throughout, and how close the driver is willing to get to walls and clipping points. The King of Europe Drift ProSeries has developed its own telemetry system, which uses GPS data to accurately measure speed, angle and line, thus leading to a very objective result for the qualifying sessions.

== Drift cars ==
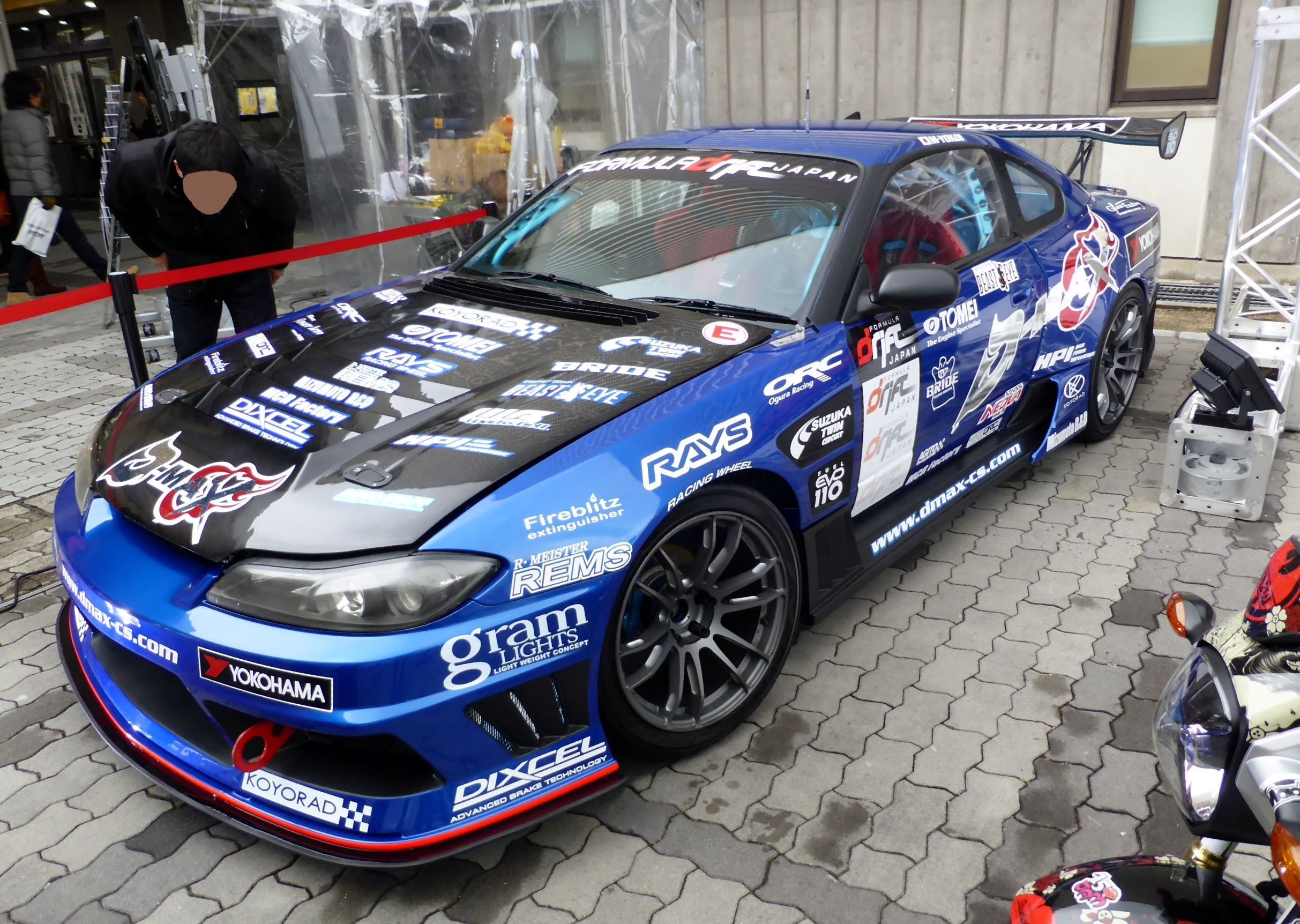
Nissan Silvia S15 drift car built to compete in Formula Drift Japan

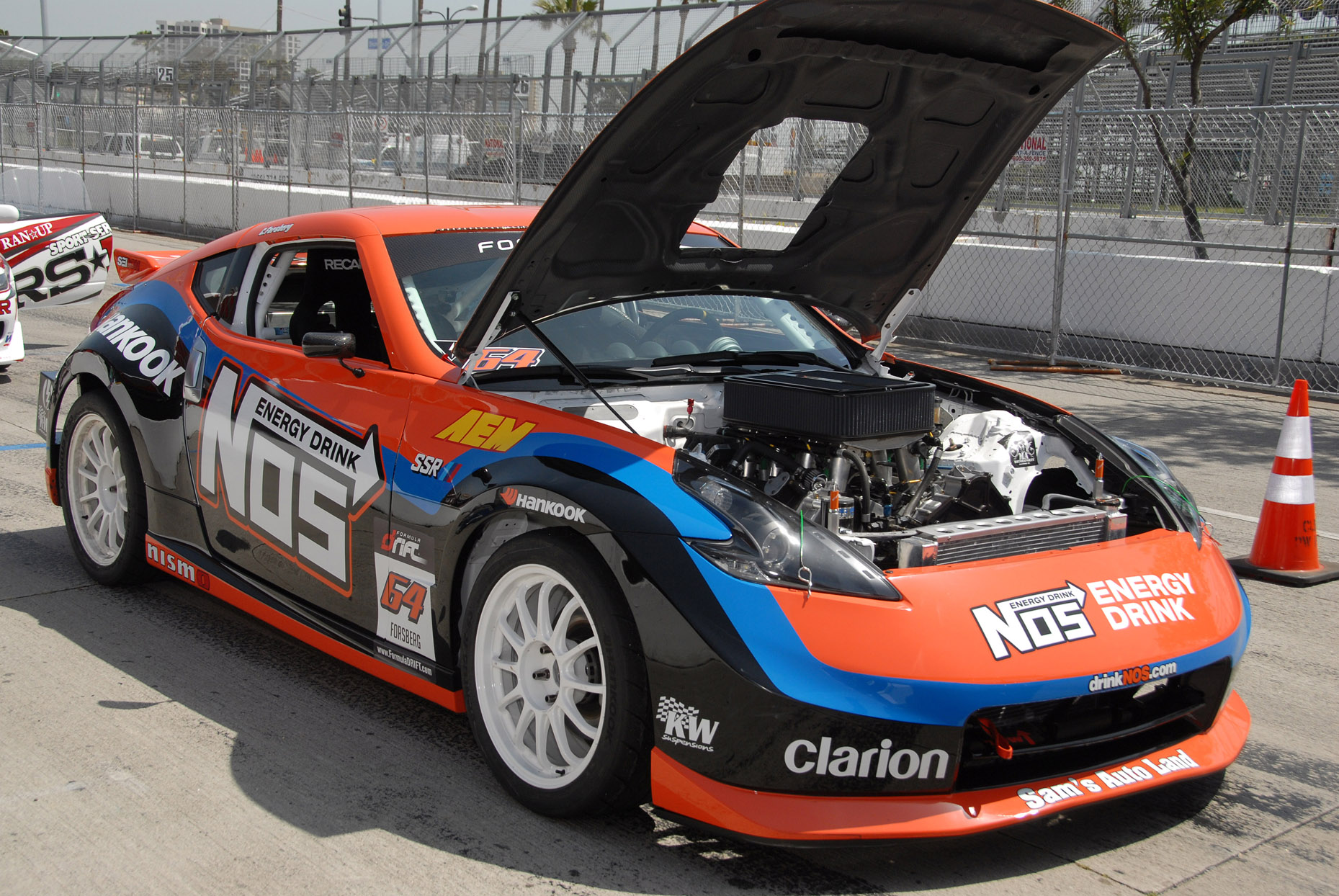
Nissan 370Z built to compete in Formula D with a naturally aspirated VK56 V8 engine swap from a Nissan Titan

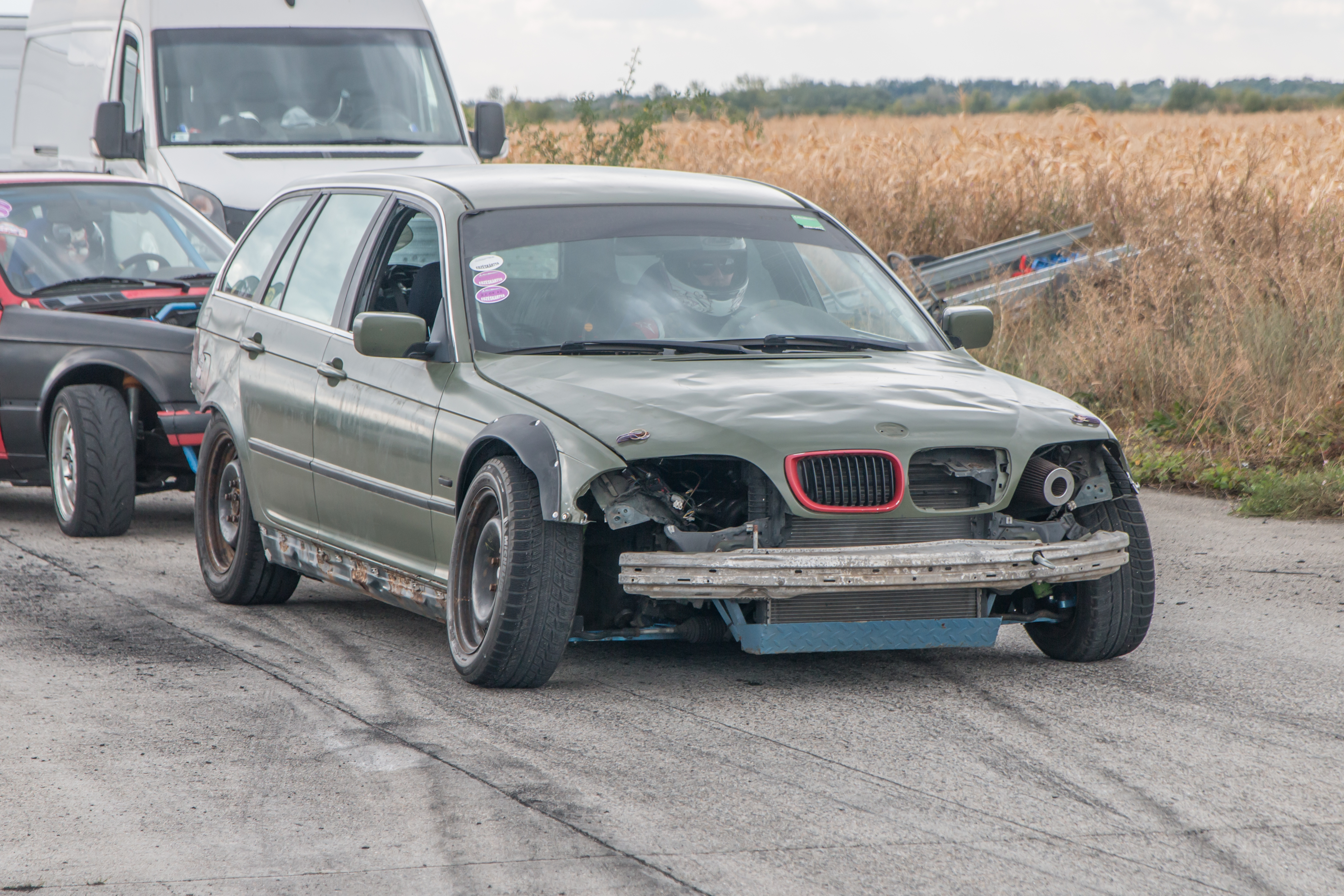
BMW E46 – note the negative front wheel camber and widened wheel arches

Drift cars are usually light- to moderate-weight rear-wheel-drive coupes and sedans, offering a large range of power levels. There have also been all-wheel drive cars that have been converted to rear-wheel drive such as the Subaru WRX, Toyota Avensis, BMW M4 Competition, Scion tC, Mitsubishi Lancer Evolution, Dodge Charger, and Nissan GT-R. Early on, AWD cars without conversion were allowed in some drifting competitions, and usually the rules allowed only a certain percentage of power to be sent to the front wheels, but they are banned in most drifting competitions today.

Despite the possibility of obtaining desirable Japanese domestic market vehicles in continents outside Japan, drifters in other countries prefer to use local versions of the same cars (for example, a Nissan 240SX instead of a Nissan Silvia S13, etc.), or even domestic cars. A high volume of Japanese imports were brought to countries such as Australia and New Zealand, however it is not unusual to see Australian/New Zealand domestic vehicles such as the Holden Commodore or Ford Falcon used in drifting competitions.

The American market saw a relatively high volume of JDM cars being imported over the last decade, despite Japanese domestic vehicles being right-hand-drive only. Locally-sold imports such as the Lexus SC and Nissan 240SX feature heavily in American drifting, but they are usually modified with JDM engines to mirror their Japanese domestic equivalents (usually with a Toyota JZ-GTE or Nissan CA18DET/SR20DET/RB26DETT respectively).

In the UK, there are a high level of Japanese imports used within the drifting scene, due in part to the UK sharing a right-hand drive layout with Japan. However, these cars often cost more than UK-market cars, partly due to import costs. There are plenty of UK and European models used as drift cars as well — older BMWs are particularly prominent due to cost and availability, with Volvo 300 series and Ford Sierras also proving popular.

In the Formula Drift Professional series, cars range from highly tuned Japanese automobiles reflecting the original styles of drifting to all-new age makes and models. Due to no power limit restrictions in the series, it is not uncommon for competitors to use a variety of different powerplants. Popular variations of Chevrolet LS engines are often seen bolted down to Japanese frames.

Beginning in 2005, American driver and two-time Formula D champion Vaughn Gittin Jr. began popularizing the use of the Ford Mustang in drifting, when muscle cars had not been used in the top level of drifting competition prior.

In the King of Europe Drift Series, the main professional drift series in Europe, BMW models have long ruled the scene, winning event after event, year after year. The most successful models include the E30, E36 and E46, which also present an advantage in cost (being more affordable than their Japanese rivals). For a few years, BMW V8 engine swaps were the most popular, typically providing a 300 to 400 horsepower output. With the continuous evolution of the sport, however, these have now become obsolete, making way for more powerful American V8 engines or classic Nissan RB26DETT and Toyota 2JZ-GTE engines.

As an example, the top 15 cars in the 2003 D1GP, top 10 in the 2004 D1GP, and top 10 in the 2005 D1GP were as follows:

Car	Model	2003	2004	2005
Nissan Silvia	S15	6 cars	5 cars	3 cars
Toyota Levin/Trueno	AE86	3 cars	3 cars	2 cars
Mazda RX-7	FD3S	2 cars	1 car	2 cars
Nissan Skyline	R34	1 car	1 car	1 car
Nissan Silvia	S13	5 cars		
Toyota Chaser	JZX100	1 car		
Subaru Impreza	GD (RWD)			1 car
Toyota Altezza	SXE10			1 car

The top cars in the Red Bull Drifting Championship were as follows:

Driver	Make	Model
Tanner Foust	Nissan	350Z
Ryan Tuerck	Toyota	GT86
Ken Gushi	Scion	tC
Kevin Huynh	Dodge	Viper
Rhys Millen	Pontiac	Solstice GXP
Samuel Hübinette	Dodge	Charger
Chris Forsberg	Nissan	370Z

As for 2017, the top cars participating in Formula Drift are the Nissan 370Z, Nissan Silvia S14, Nissan Silvia S15, Toyota 86, BMW E46, Ford Mustang, and the Mazda MX-5.

== Drift tuning ==
=== Drivetrain ===
A mechanical limited-slip differential (LSD) is considered essential for drifting. Drifting with an open or viscous differential in a sustained slide generally yields relatively less impressive results. All other modifications are secondary to the LSD.

A diagram showing two different drifting techniques

The preferred form of LSD for drifting is the clutch type, in "two-way" form, for its consistent and aggressive lockup behavior under both acceleration and deceleration. Some drift cars use a spool "differential", which actually has no differential action at all — the wheels are locked to each other. Drifters on a budget may use a welded differential, where the side gears are welded to give the same effect as a spool. This makes it easier to break rear traction, because it reduces maximum traction in all situations except traveling in a straight line. Welded differentials have an inherent risk involved: due to the tremendous amount of internal stress, the welds may fail and the differential completely lock up leaving the rear wheels immobilized. Helical torque-sensing differentials such as the Torsen or Quaife (available on cars in certain stock trims such as the S15, FD3S, MX-5, JZA80, and UZZ3x) are also adequate. It is common for drifters to change the final gear ratio depending on the type of track layout.

The clutches on drift cars tend to be very tough ceramic-brass button or multiple-plate varieties for durability, as well as to allow rapid "clutch kick" techniques to upset the grip of the rear wheels. Gearbox and engine mounts are often replaced with urethane or aluminum mounts, and dampers are added to control the violent motion of the engine and gearbox under these conditions. The driveshafts are often replaced with carbon fiber drive shafts, as they offer the highest rotational mass savings, are stronger than alternative metals, and flexible enough to absorb and dissipate vibrations, thus easing the load on the gearbox as well as the rest of the drivetrain.

Gear sets may be replaced with closer ratios to keep the engine in the power band, or, on some cars that produce enough power and torque to four-gear transmissions similar to the ones used in NASCAR (such as the Andrews four-speed dog box that Vaughn Gittin Jr. ran in his 2016 Mustang) with more open-ratio gears, this limits the number of shifts the driver has to do during their run. These may be coarser dog engagement straight cut gears instead of synchronised helical gears, for durability and faster shifting at the expense of noise and refinement. Wealthier drifters may use sequential gearboxes to make gear selection easier and faster, while sequential shift lever adapters can be used to make shifts easier without increasing shift time.

=== Steering and suspension ===
Steering angles are also crucial as the driver progresses. The first stage of these modifications is usually a modified steering knuckle or upright. Extended control arms can be employed on MacPherson strut vehicles like the Nissan S-Chassis to allow for more clearance for higher steering angles. Many aftermarket companies have developed full lock kits including modification of the vehicle's original scrub radius, kingpin axis, Ackermann angle, amount of bump steer, caster angle, and kinematics as to maximize front grip and eliminate mechanical bind at steering angles in excess of 60°. While MacPherson strut vehicles are prevalent in professional drifting, double wishbone suspension vehicles can also be competitive, with often better caster and camber curves.

Springs and shock absorbers are also tuned for higher skill levels, depending on track layout, which is included on almost all production cars. While Ackermann geometry is helpful in making a car turn easier, it inhibits the ability to slide sideways at full lock necessary to compete in drifting.

==== Common modifications ====
Drift cars need a stiff suspension to reduce things like body roll and bouncing. Having a stiff suspension also allows for stronger suspension components that can withstand the damage and more importantly improved handling making it safer for the driver to drift. The suspension (especially for a drift car) can get quite complex. However, some of the first modifications done to a drift car will be the addition of coilovers as they are the heart of the cars suspension. This is a simple but major modification that stiffens the suspension instantaneously and allows for the car to handle well; all while adding some style with a lowered look.

Sway bars and bushings are typically what many drift builds would complete next. Sway bars are sometimes discounted in the drift world but have a big importance. Sway bars limit the amount of "sway" or body roll you feel when taking corners, thus allowing for a more stable drift. Bushings are replaced with harder bushing to hold up in heavy loading and keep the alignment in place.

When replacing suspension components, oftentimes an alignment will be required to ensure you will handle correctly. The alignment can get tricky when looking on forums so its recommended that you get adjustable parts so that you can adjust your alignment as needed.

==== Steering modifications ====
Steering modification is done by many people to help with angle. Having more angle allows for more countersteer which prevents you from spinning out. There are angle kits are what is needed to complete this mod. Modifying the steering knuckles are a common way to achieve wider steering and sometimes putting a spacer between the inner tire rod joint and steering rack is done.

=== Cockpit ===
Because of the high centrifugal forces encountered during drifting, drivers are usually retained by a racing seat and five-point harness. This allows the hands to merely turn the wheel, instead of bracing the body in the seat. The same applies for the feet, which are free to move rapidly between clutch, brake and accelerator pedals. The steering wheel is usually relatively small, dished, and perfectly round, so that it can be released and allowed to spin in the driver's hands as the caster returns the front wheels to center. The locking knob on the hand brake is usually replaced with a spin turn knob; this stops the hand brake locking on when pulled. Nearly all drivers move the hand brake location or add an extra hydraulic hand brake actuator for greater braking force. Additional gauges are used to monitor boost levels, oil pressure and temperature, intake and coolant temperatures, and air-fuel ratio, among other data. Some drivers, especially in larger cars, move the seating position for a better weight distribution, such as Daigo Saito and his 2014 JZX100 Mk.II Chaser.

=== Tires ===
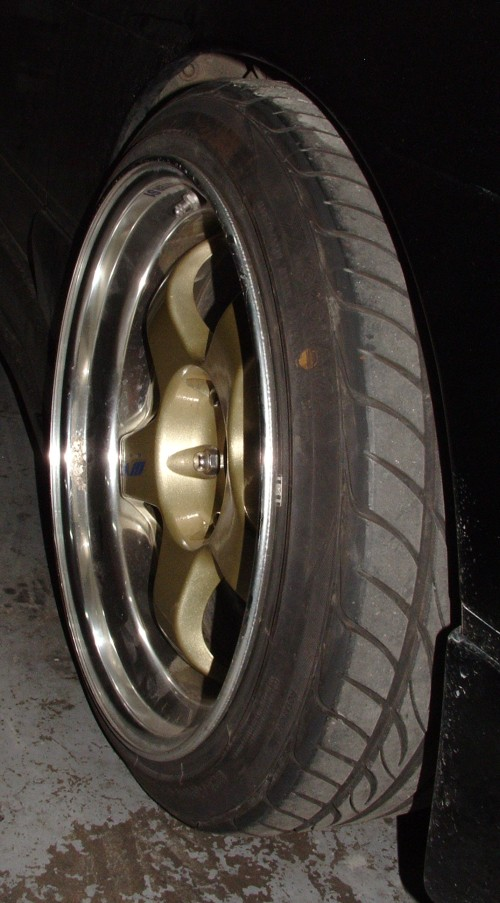
S13 Silvia - tire stretched over a wide rim, increasing sidewall rigidity. The rim has a low offset to increase track.

In the United States, competitive drifters are required to run USDOT-approved (road-legal) tires similar to racing slicks in rubber composition, but with shallow treads included. This is permitted, with the exception of some major championships including D1GP and Formula Drift, which only permit commercially available tires that are approved by the sanctioning body. Professional drifting has come to the point where grip is tuned into cars to be defeated. It makes for a faster drift necessary in the current professional climate. Tires typically used by drifters are around the DOT tread wear rating of 200. Examples include the Hankook Ventus RS-3, Falken Azenis RT615K, Nitto NT05, Yokohama ADVAN Neova AD08R, and Achilles Radial 123s. Some other companies from Asia have also started developing their technology through sponsoring professional drivers. These companies include Nankang, Westlake and Zestino. Tires are often modified with lettering to give them a more customized look.

== R/C drifting ==
R/C drifting refers to the act of drifting with a radio-controlled car. R/C cars are equipped with special low-grip tires, usually made from PVC or ABS piping. Some manufacturers make radial drift tires that are made of actual rubber compounds. The car's setup is usually changed to allow it to drift more easily. R/C drifting is most successful on AWD R/C cars. However, RWD chassis drift cars offer the most realistic experience. In fact beginners will be more at ease with AWD chassis. The drift is easier to handle compared to the RWD chassis. With more experience, they turn to drive with RWD. However the RWD being more expensive, it is advised to start with AWD chassis. Many very good AWD cars with a robust chassis can be found for less than 50 US dollars, what makes this hobby affordable for all. The RWD chassis for more advanced driver could be found above 1,000 US dollars. Companies such as Overdose, Yokomo, MST, Tamiya, Team Associated, and Hobby Products International have made dedicated drift cars and supported the hobby.

== In the media ==
=== Film and television ===
One of the key sources responsible for the international spread of drifting is the Japanese manga and anime series Initial D, which features Takumi Fujiwara, a high school student who learns to drift on the Mount Akina tōge (mountain pass) using a custom Toyota AE86. The series features a large number of Japanese performance vehicles, including the Mazda RX-7, the Nissan Skyline, the Toyota Supra, the Toyota MR-2, the Mazda MX-5 and many other vehicles.

Hollywood embraced the drifting subculture in the film The Fast and the Furious: Tokyo Drift (2006).

Paul Newman's character Doc Hudson, a 1951 Hudson Hornet who is later revealed to be the Fabulous Hudson Hornet, teaches his drifting technique to rookie Piston Cup racer Lightning McQueen in the Pixar film Cars (2006). Hudson's technique is referred to as "right to go left" and is mainly performed on dirt. Lightning, as well as other characters such as Mater, would continue to use variations of the drifting technique throughout the franchise.

The 2017 film Baby Driver features an extended drifting chase scene in which Ansel Elgort's eponymous character drives a Subaru WRX to evade the police after a bank robbery.

The 2019 Netflix television series Hyperdrive is a reality competition show that focuses heavily on drifting, won by Diego Higa of Brazil.

=== Computer and console gaming ===
Drifting's popularity in computer games extends back to early arcade racers where techniques for games such as Sega Rally and Ridge Racer involved drifting. The technique is now considered mainstream in modern games in all their forms. In-game communities have developed within games such as Assetto Corsa, BeamNG.drive, Forza Motorsport and Gran Turismo, made up of teams who battle in user-created tournaments.

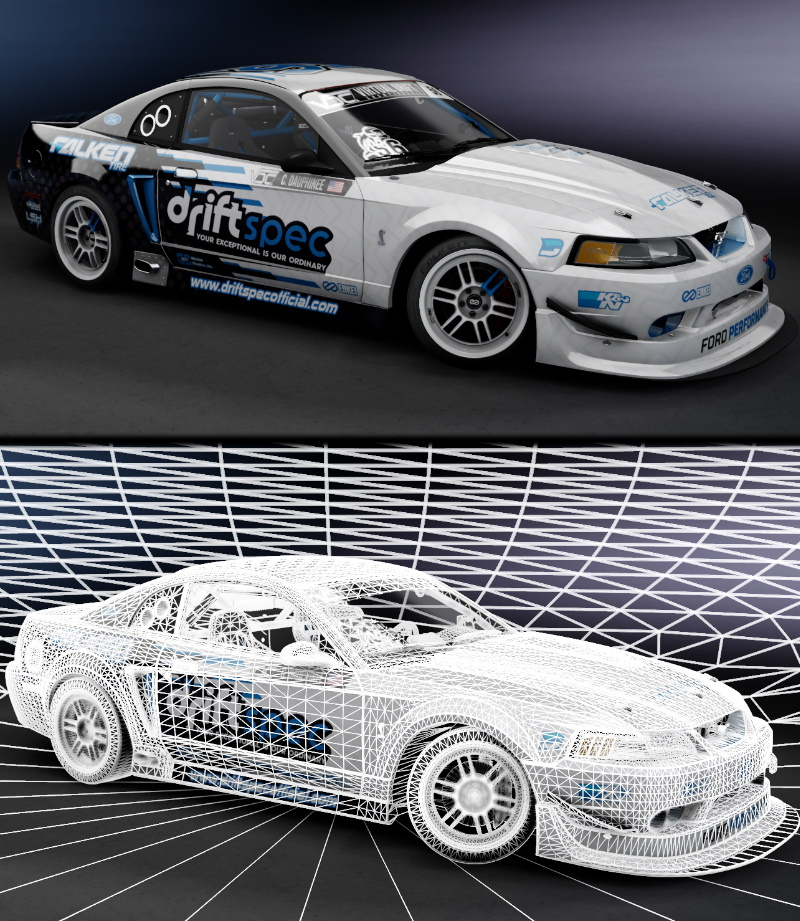
(TOP) A custom 3D modeled Ford Mustang built to compete in VDC. The car also features a player created livery. (BOTTOM) A wireframe view of the model.

Assetto Corsa has become a popular choice for many due to the simulator physics that is close to real world driving and the variety of Championships it offers. Some of the most notable include the Virtual Drift Championship, The Drift Corner Grand Prix, and more recently the eSports Drifting Championship. Some championships have also been created by real world event organizers such as the Drift Masters Virtual Championship. Assetto Corsa is also extremely modifiable with individual players able to create their own custom built cars and tracks from scratch. Many models are controversially pulled from games such as Forza Motorsport 7 and then modified to fit the needs of the driver. The data that drives these cars is also completely customizable, allowing players to recreate engines from real world dynamometer data as well as suspension geometry. This results in an extremely realistic simulation of each vehicle when data is created accurately. Championships often scrutinize car data closely and are constantly aiming to more accurately depict the features of a virtual cars real life counterpart. Because of this, drivers are beginning to use Assetto Corsa as a tool to practice for real world championships.

BeamNG.drive is rising in popularity in the drifting world, through YouTube Shorts content creators and in-game updates. BeamNG.drive has multiple in-game drifting vehicle configurations, from drift missiles to competition vehicles. BeamNG.drive is regarded as one of the most in-depth and realistic driving computer games, as the game focuses heavily on vehicle tunability and simulation, with one of the widest ranges of vehicle customisation options, from everything from individual coilover dampening to adding on roof racks. There are also multiple in-game missions that focus heavily on drifting. The popular multiplayer mod for BeamNG.drive, BeamMP, is downloaded through third-party software and can be used for tandem drifting, drifting competitions and more.

Drifting also features heavily in the Need for Speed franchise (notably games since Need for Speed: Underground), the Grid franchise, the Juiced franchise and in Japanese domestic console games such as Initial D: Extreme Stage (PS3), which is based solely on drifting. It has become mainstream enough that there are also indie games about drifting such as Absolute Drift.

Drifting and the related technique of powersliding feature heavily in the Mario Kart franchise, where a successful drift or powerslide around corners will award the player with a short nitrous boost known as a "mini-turbo", with longer drifts awarding a slightly longer speed boost. Similar gameplay mechanics also exist in games from the Asphalt series, where drifting and other fast-paced vehicular maneuvers are a recurring theme.

Browser-based games include the popular Drift Hunters introduced by Developer illia kaminetskyi in February 2017, NZ Performance Car's Drift Legends (the first online game to feature real racetracks, and now ported to iPhone/iPod touch) and Mercedes-AMG’s Wintersport Drift Competition (the first manufacturer-backed drifting game). Drifting games for mobile devices are readily available from major developers and independent studios.

=== Documentaries ===
High Performance Imports. Volume 10 features Australian journalists from express publications, and Australian professional drifter Darren Appleton traveling to Japan, purchasing a drift vehicle (Nissan R32 GTS-T four-door), traveling with the likes of D1 champions and entering a drift event.

In 2011 Phil Morrison and James Robinson of Driftworks embarked on a journey to Japan where they would shoot a documentary about the local drifting scene, which would become known to the public as "Outsiders".

== See also ==
- Opposite lock
- Tafheet—illegal street drifting in Arab countries.
- Understeer and oversteer
- Fishtailing
- Handbrake turn
- Jackknifing
- Scandinavian flick
- Slip, similar technique applied to aircraft in flight, in which an aircraft is travelling somewhat sideways while moving forward
- Spinning (motorsport)
