= Handbrake turn =

Driving technique

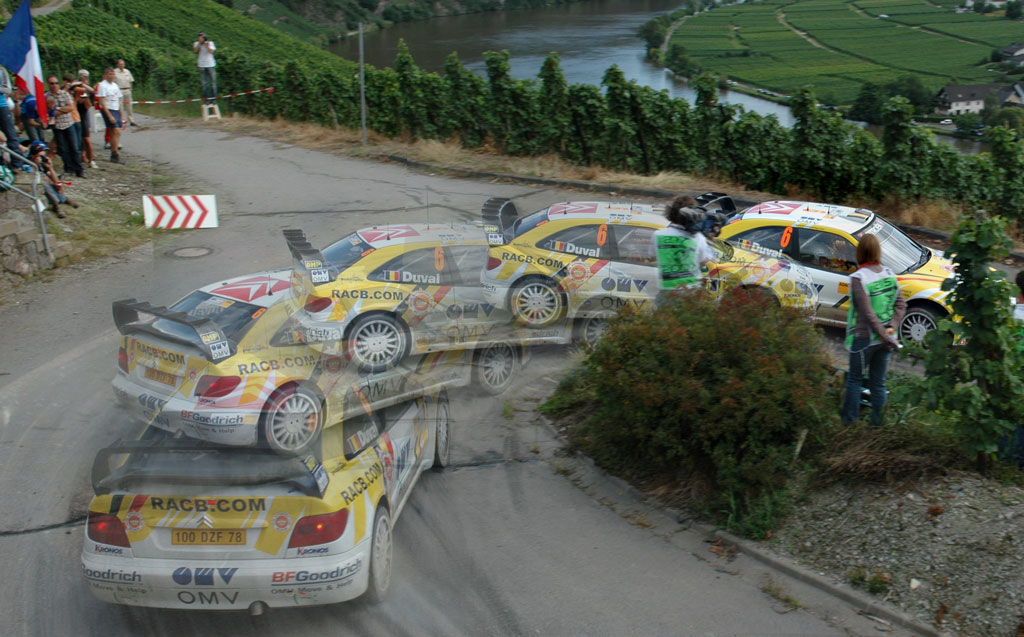
Time-lapse composite of François Duval performing a handbrake turn with his Citroën Xsara WRC during 2007 Rallye Deutschland

The handbrake turn (also known as a bootleg or bootlegger's turn) is a driving technique used to deliberately slide a car sideways, either for the purpose of quickly negotiating a very tight bend, or for turning around well within the vehicle's own turning diameter.

== Technique ==
The driver starts by using steering input to transfer weight to the outside tires; the handbrake is then used to lock the rear wheels, thus upsetting the adhesion between the tires and the road surface. With practice, the car can be placed accurately by releasing the handbrake and accelerating the vehicle. The technique is used in some forms of motorsport, for example rallying, autotesting, drifting and motorkhana.

Many sports cars, especially UK makes such as MG and Triumph, as late as the early 1970s were offered with a fly-off handbrake option for competition purposes—the button on the end of the lever has to be pressed before the brake will lock on, which is the reverse of the normal arrangement—allowing for faster and more controlled application in a handbrake turn, and less liable to be accidentally locked on while doing such a maneuver.

In a rear-wheel drive manual transmission vehicle, it is also necessary to operate the clutch to prevent the handbrake from stalling the engine.

== Physics involved ==
In a normal turn, without wheels sliding, rear wheels follow the front ones because resistance to motion in the forward direction is significantly lower than in the sideways direction. Lateral resistance (tyres' static friction) provides the centripetal force that makes the rear end of the car follow the turn. When the driver locks the rear wheels with the handbrake, both directions offer the same resistance (kinetic friction). Due to inertia, the rear end tends to continue in the same direction, and slides out.

== Usage ==
Handbrake turns are primarily a technique used to negotiate tight turns in motorsport but can also be used in certain other applications such as stunt or pursuit driving.

For stunt purposes, parallel parking can be completed in a single motion using the handbrake. This technique is often demonstrated at car shows, demonstrating the vehicle's agility and the driver's control.

In pursuit driving, the technique can be used for turning the car around in the width of two lanes without using a three-point maneuver (see bootleg turn), for example, to bewilder a pursuer. It can also be used to quickly negotiate tight corners.

The handbrake turn has colloquially been called the bootlegger's turn in the US as it was reported to be used by bootleggers transporting illegally manufactured alcoholic drinks while escaping from the IRS. It has been reportedly used by boy racers on public roads as a manoeuvre to show off to their friends.

== Usage in drifting and rallying ==
Whereas pulling the handbrake is the easiest way to start a drift, it is rarely used in circuit racing because it causes a significant loss of speed at the exit of the corner. Racers use handbrake turning only to negotiate tight 180-degree bends that would otherwise require a three-point turn.

Handbrake turns are commonly used in rallying to negotiate tight, low-speed corners, and also as a means of performing manoeuvres and stunts.

== Dangers ==
The handbrake turn is not recommended for novice racing drivers, as pulling the brake with too little or too much force will not lock the wheels correctly to allow the vehicle to negotiate the corner correctly.

Like other methods of inducing a drift, the handbrake turn does pose a serious risk of the vehicle flipping over, and caution must be taken when performing the maneuver with a vehicle with a high center of gravity (such as an SUV). The basic danger lies in bad judgment of surroundings, resulting in the sliding vehicle hitting an obstacle (another vehicle, a guardrail or a tree), or bad judgment of speed, resulting in the vehicle driving off the road entirely rather than sliding, or releasing the handbrake when the vehicle is moving sideways so that all tire forces are sideways.

== See also ==
- Drifting (motorsport)
- Left-foot braking
- Bootleg turn
