= Understeer and oversteer =

Vehicle dynamics terms

Understeer and oversteer are vehicle dynamics terms used to describe the sensitivity of the vehicle to changes in steering angle associated with changes in lateral acceleration. This sensitivity is defined for a level road for a given steady state operating condition by the Society of Automotive Engineers (SAE) in document J670 and by the International Organization for Standardization (ISO) in document 8855. Whether the vehicle is understeer or oversteer depends on the rate of change of the understeer angle. The understeer angle is the amount of additional steering (at the road wheels, not the hand wheel) that must be added in any given steady-state maneuver beyond the Ackermann steer angle. The Ackermann steer angle is the steer angle at which the vehicle would travel about a curve when there is no lateral acceleration required (at negligibly low speed).

The understeer gradient (U) is the rate of change of the understeer angle with respect to lateral acceleration on a level road for a given steady state operating condition.

The vehicle is understeer if the understeer gradient is positive, oversteer if the understeer gradient is negative, and neutral steer if the understeer gradient is zero.

Car and motorsport enthusiasts often use the terminology informally in magazines and blogs to describe vehicle response to steering in a variety of manoueuvres.

== Dynamics ==
=== Test to determine understeer gradient ===
Several tests can be used to determine understeer gradient: constant radius (repeat tests at different speeds), constant speed (repeat tests with different steering angles), or constant steer (repeat tests at different speeds). Formal descriptions of these three kinds of testing are provided by ISO. Gillespie goes into some detail on two of the measurement methods.

Results depend on the type of test, so simply giving a deg/g value is not sufficient; it is also necessary to indicate the type of procedure used to measure the gradient.

Vehicles are inherently nonlinear systems, and it is normal for U to vary over the range of testing. It is possible for a vehicle to show understeer in some conditions and oversteer in others. Therefore, it is necessary to specify the speed and lateral acceleration whenever reporting understeer/oversteer characteristics.

=== Contributions to understeer gradient ===
Many properties of the vehicle affect the understeer gradient, including tyre cornering stiffness, camber thrust, lateral force compliance steer, self aligning torque, lateral weight transfer, and compliance in the steering system. Weight distribution affects the normal force on each tyre and therefore its grip. These individual contributions can be identified analytically or by measurement in a Bundorf analysis.

=== In contrast to limit handling behavior ===
Great care must be taken to avoid conflating the understeer/oversteer behavior with the limit behavior of a vehicle. The physics are very different. They have different handling implications and different causes. The former is concerned with tire distortion effects due to slip and camber angles as increasing levels of lateral acceleration are attained. The latter is concerned with the limiting friction case in which either the front or rear wheels become saturated first. It is best to use race driver's descriptive terms "push (plow) and loose (spin)" for limit behavior so that these concepts are not confused.

=== Limit handling characteristics ===
Tyres transmit lateral (side to side) and longitudinal (front to back) forces to the ground. The total traction force (grip) available to the tyre is the vector sum of the lateral and longitudinal forces, a function of the normal force and coefficient of friction. If the lateral and longitudinal forces presented at the tyre during operations exceeds the tyre's available traction force then the tyre is said to be saturated and will lose its grip on the ground and start to slip.

Push (plow) can be understood as a condition where, while cornering, the front tyres become saturated before the rear and slip first. Since the front tyres cannot provide any additional lateral force and the rear tyres can, the front of the vehicle will follow a path of greater radius than the rear and if there are no changes to the steering angle (i.e. the steering wheel stays in the same position), the vehicle's front will slide to the outside of the curve.

If the rear tyres become saturated before the front, the front tyres will keep the front of the vehicle on the desired path but the rear tyres will slip and follow a path with a greater radius. The back end will swing out and the vehicle will turn toward the inside of the curve. If the steering angle is not changed, then the front wheels will trace out a smaller and smaller circle while the rear wheels continue to swing around the front of the car. This is what is happening when a car 'spins out'. A car susceptible to being loose is sometimes known as 'tail happy', as in the way a dog wags its tail when happy and a common problem is fishtailing.

In real-world driving, there are continuous changes in speed, acceleration (vehicle braking or accelerating), steering angle, etc. Those changes are all constantly altering the load distribution of the vehicle, which, along with changes in tyre temperatures and road surface conditions are constantly changing the maximum traction force available at each tyre. Generally, though, it is changes to the center of mass which cause tyre saturation and inform limit handling characteristics.

If the center of mass is moved forward, the understeer gradient tends to increase due to tyre load sensitivity. When the center of mass is moved rearward, the understeer gradient tends to decrease. The shifting of the center of mass is proportional to acceleration and affected by the height of the center of mass. When braking, more of the vehicles weight (load) is put on the front tyres and less on the rear tyres. Conversely, when the vehicle accelerates, the opposite happens, the weight shifts to the rear tires. Similarly, as the center of mass of the load is shifted from one side to the other, the inside or outside tyres traction changes. In extreme cases, the inside or front tyres may completely lift off the ground, eliminating or reducing the steering input that can be transferred to the ground.

While weight distribution and suspension geometry have the greatest effect on measured understeer gradient in a steady-state test, power distribution, brake bias and front-rear weight transfer will also affect which wheels lose traction first in many real-world scenarios.

== Limit conditions ==
Spin: The car turns more sharply than intended.

Plow: The car does not turn enough.

When an understeering vehicle is taken to the grip limit of the tyres, where it is no longer possible to increase lateral acceleration, the vehicle will follow a path with a radius larger than intended. Although the vehicle cannot increase lateral acceleration, it is dynamically stable.

When an oversteering vehicle is taken to the grip limit of the tyres, it becomes dynamically unstable with a tendency to spin. Although the vehicle is unstable in open-loop control, a skilled driver can maintain control past the point of instability with countersteering and/or correct use of the throttle or even brakes; this is done purposely in the sport of drifting.

If a rear-wheel-drive vehicle has enough power to spin the rear wheels, it can initiate oversteer at any time by sending enough engine power to the wheels that they start spinning. Once traction is broken, they are relatively free to swing laterally. Under braking load, more work is typically done by the front brakes. If this forward bias is too great, then the front tyres may lose traction, causing understeer.

== Related measures ==
Understeer gradient is one of the main measures for characterizing steady-state cornering behavior. It is involved in other properties such as characteristic speed (the speed for an understeer vehicle where the steer angle needed to negotiate a turn is twice the Ackermann angle), lateral acceleration gain (g's/deg), yaw velocity gain (1/s), and critical speed (the speed where an oversteer vehicle has infinite lateral acceleration gain).
