= Gymkhana (motorsport) =

Type of motorsport

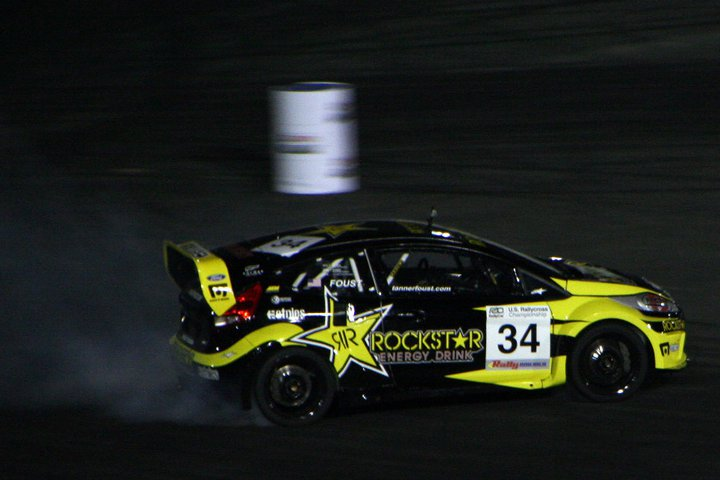
Gymkhana in California, United States

Gymkhana is a type of motorsport, known as motorkhana in Australia and New Zealand and as autotesting in the United Kingdom and Ireland. Similar to autocross, the goal of gymkhana is to achieve the fastest time possible; memorizing the course is a significant part of achieving a fast time. The name is loaned from the equestrian discipline of gymkhana.

Gymkhana events are time and/or speed events in an automobile. These can feature obstacles such as cones, tires, and barrels. The driver must manoeuver through a predetermined track performing many different driving techniques. What separates gymkhana from traditional autocross events is that the gymkhana requires drivers to perform reversals, 180 degree spins, 360 degree spins, parking boxes, figure 8s, and other advanced skills. Drifting is also encouraged where helpful or necessary. Essentially, a gymkhana is any event featuring a starting point, a finish line and some sort of obstacle to get through, around, or by, all within a certain time limit.

== Drivers ==
The driver's goal is to get through the course as quickly as possible with the fewest mistakes. Acceleration, braking, drifting, and grip driving are all necessary. Not only does the driver have to hold control over the car, but gymkhana requires strong mental concentration and memorization.

== History ==
Gymkhana was originally equestrian in nature. Throughout history and cultures, riders have come together to test their skills against one another by competing on horseback in challenges. These challenges could be simple races, or they could incorporate elements such as flag retrieval, maneuvering around pylons, or through rough terrain. As the art of equestrianism evolved, gymkhana became more formalized, taking place at venues such as polo grounds.

The origin of motorsport gymkhana is not certain. However, it is speculated that it might have begun after World War 2, when American soldiers brought home small and nimble cars from Europe. The smaller cars designed for dense European cities could not compete in races against American cars meant for open countryside, so new events were designed for them involving skillful maneuvering through complex courses. This soon evolved into the American form of autocross.

== Courses ==
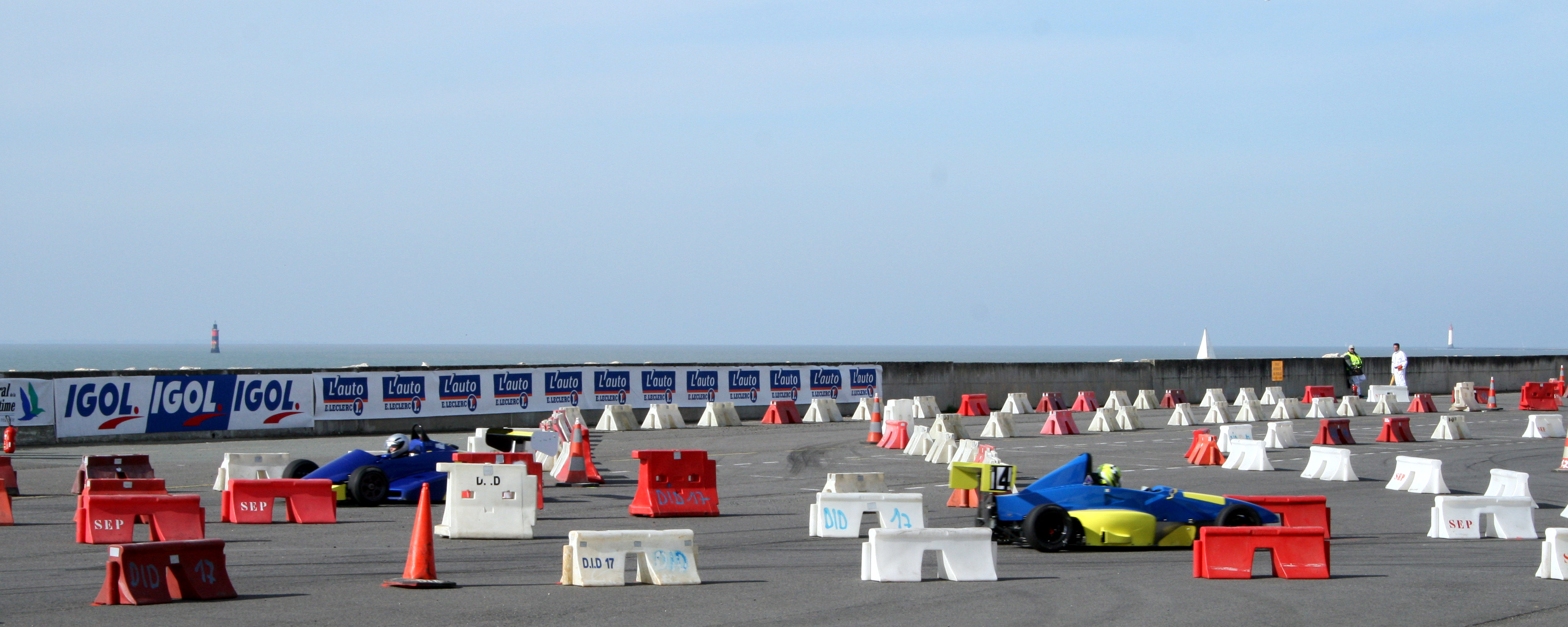
Gymkhana course in France

Gymkhana courses typically involve only the use of first and second gear, where autotesting in the UK and Ireland add the use of reverse gear. A gymkhana course will typically be from 0:45 to 1:30 in length. Like autocross and autotesting, gymkhana courses are laid out with cones representing "obstacles" to navigate through. Unlike autocross, which can be considered to be a small version of a road course, obstacles in gymkhana will often consist of slaloms, 180 degree turns, 360 degree turns, figure eight turns and sometimes parking boxes. Gymkhana requires strong mental concentration and memorization of the track, as sections of the course frequently must be repeated or navigated backwards and or differently. The driver will use many techniques to effectively navigate a course. Handbrake technique, drifting and sliding and Left-foot braking are all necessary skills for gymkhana.

== Competition format ==
As the Japan Automobile Federation (JAF) is a subsidiary of the Fédération Internationale de l'Automobile (FIA), FIA classing is used for Gymkhana in Japan. Gymkhana courses may be used for an entire year, unlike autocross and autotesting where drivers are presented with a new course for each event. Gymkhana participants are allowed two runs of the course, with the fastest time being used to determine the winner of a class. Time penalties are issued for hitting cones, and a failure to navigate the course correctly results in no time score.

== National structure ==
Gymkhana in Japan has a well-defined competition structure, with everything from local to national competitions. Drivers can compete in official events locally in order to qualify for regional events and so on. Japan has an All Japan Gymkhana competition each year. Despite being governed under the FIA in Japan, there is no official international gymkhana competition at this time. Drivers in official events may be required to hold a JAF-issued competition license.

== See also ==
- Autocross (United States)
- Autoslalom
- Autotesting
- Gymkhana Grid
- Motorkhana
- Motorcycle trials
- Motorcycle Gymkhana
