= Autoslalom =

Motorsport on short, temporary courses

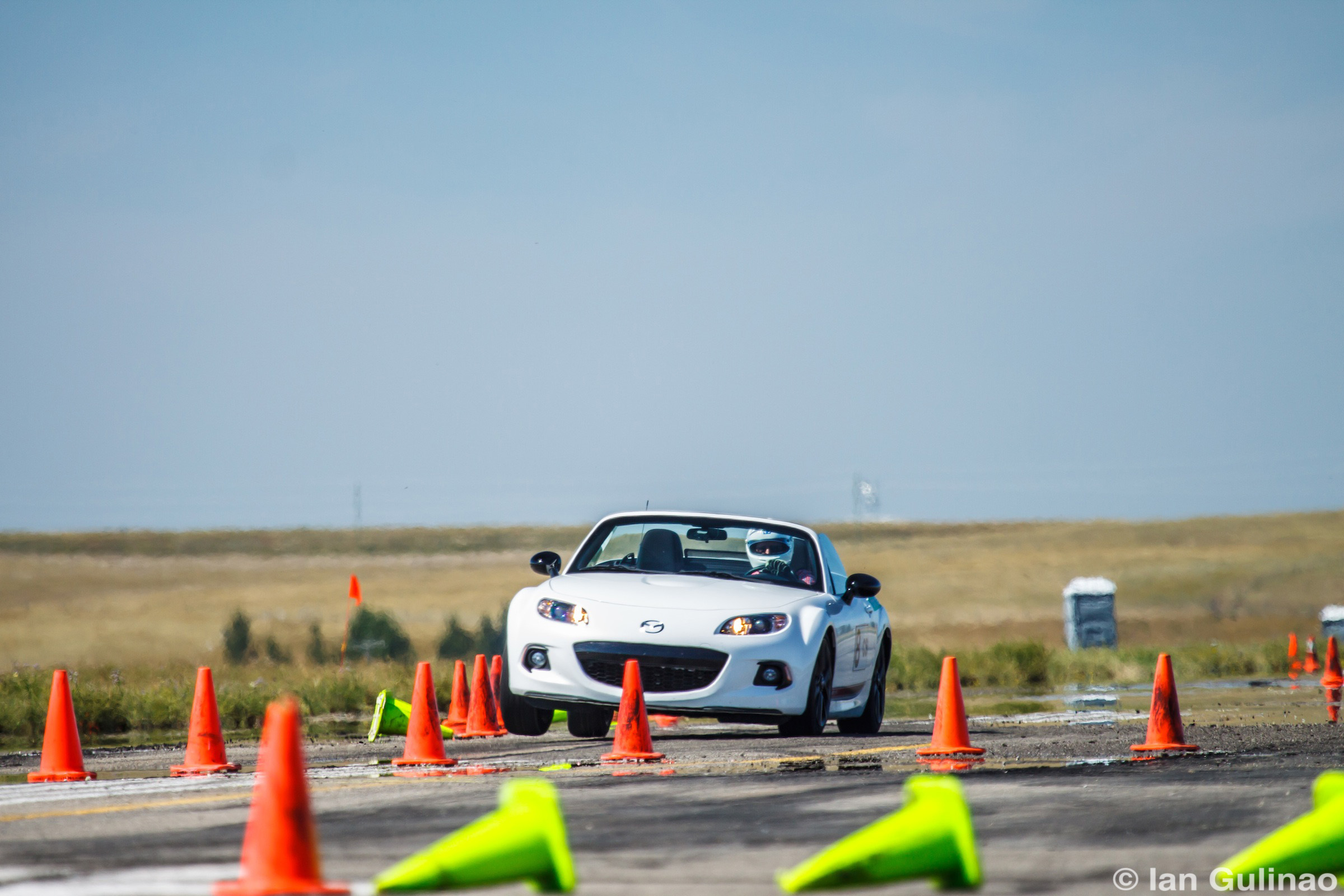
Autoslalom event as part of the Canadian championship

Autoslalom (auto slalom, slalom) is a form of motorsport that takes place on short, temporary courses marked out on areas of sealed-surfaces such as car parks or disused airport runways. Competitors are timed to complete the course, with penalties given for diverting from the route or for touching the course markers. Each competitor starts individually and speeds are kept low to emphasise safety and to require good vehicle control.

Autoslalom is a constituent discipline of the international FIA Motorsport Games. There is also a European Autoslalom Championship for international competition.

In the United States, slalom, along with autocross, is an optional discipline of the Sports Car Club of America's Solo series. The differences between slalom and autocross have been described as slalom being a high speed parking-lot event, whereas autocross has higher speed on longer courses although the terms may be used interchangeably. The official rules also determine that the disciplines are similar, and that a slalom may also be the name of a section of an autocross course.

It is similar to autotesting in the United Kingdom, motorkhana in Australia and New Zealand, and autokhana in India.

== General rules ==
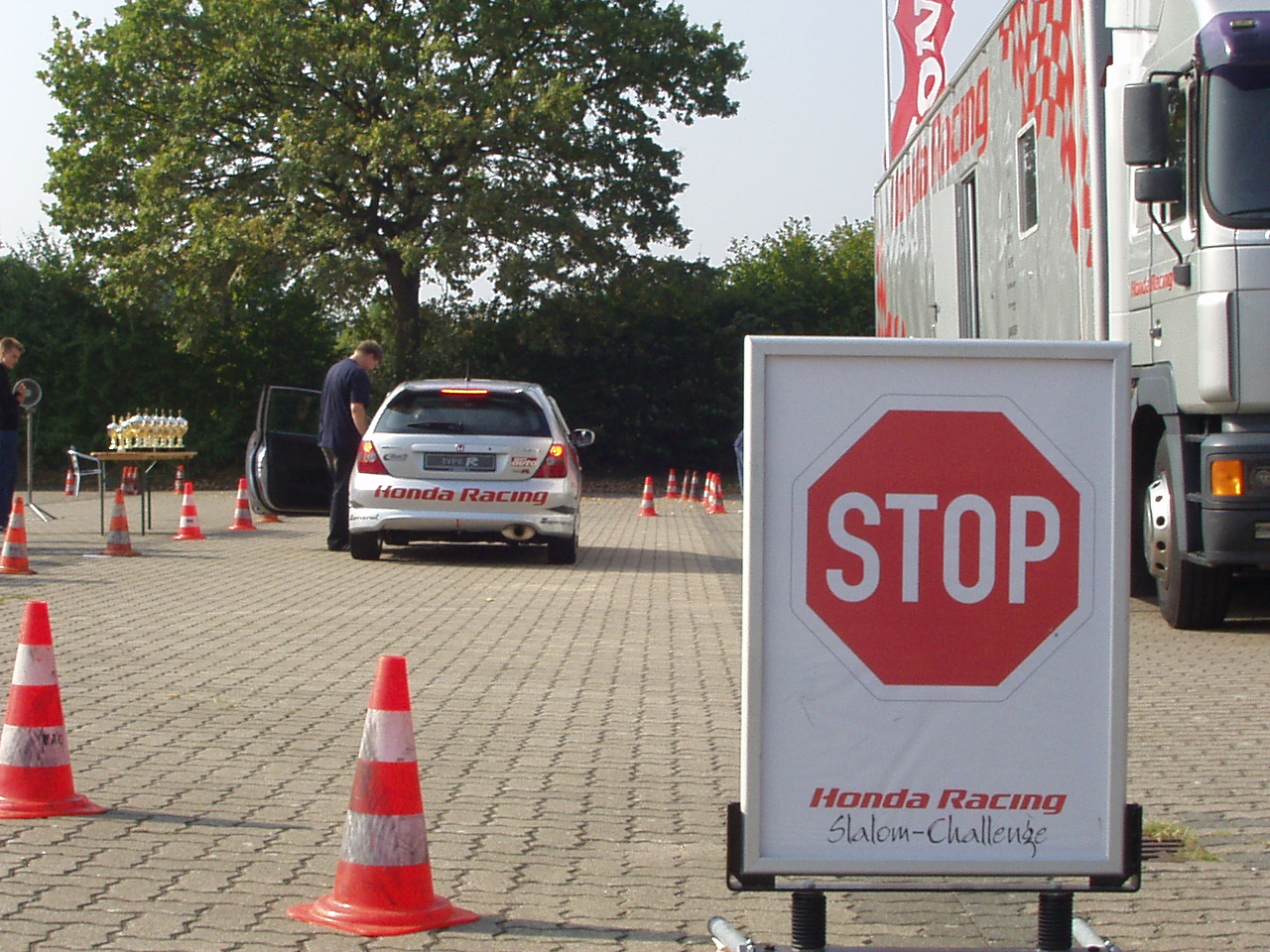
Autoslalom start box.

Courses are set out with traffic cones or pylons and may be placed on a mark to be clear where it has been hit by a competitor. Hitting a pylon is one way to score penalties, another is by getting the route incorrect. Competitors may be permitted to walk the course before competition starts, practice runs may be allowed or alternatively, a diagram of the course may be provided by the organiser. It may be a requirement to learn the course before starting with no directional signs or advice available.

Autoslaloms are usually forwards-direction only, unlike autotesting which includes reversing, and don't require loss of traction skills such as doughnuts or drifting. Some require garaging, which includes parking in a box of pylons.

There are very little restrictions on the types of cars that can be used. Though competition prepared cars may be used, drivers may be able to use their production road cars that they arrive to the event in. Some motorsport governing bodies allow participation without a motorsport license, or a free license.

== FIA Motorsport Games ==
Auto Slalom was included to the schedule of events of the Motorsport Games for the first time at the second games held in 2022 in Marseille, France. All cars were electric and identical in the form of the Opel Corsa eRally, and teams of male and female drivers both took on the course representing their nation. Auto slalom is planned to return for the third Motorsport Games in 2024, held in Valencia, Spain, within a category called Electric Street which also includes karting slalom.

== See also ==
- Autocross / Autocross (USA)
- Autotesting / autosolo (known as Solo) (UK)
- Motorkhana
- Gymkhana (motorsport)
