= Gymkhana (motorcycle) =

Motorcycle time trial sport

Motorcycle Gymkhana is a motorcycle time trial sport in which riders compete to maneuver through a paved course restricted by traffic cones or other obstacles as fast as possible.

After walking the course to familiarize themselves with the obstacles, participants ride through, individually, in a predetermined order. Each rider runs the course once in the morning and once in the afternoon. Their fastest time determines their placement.

== Competition characteristics ==
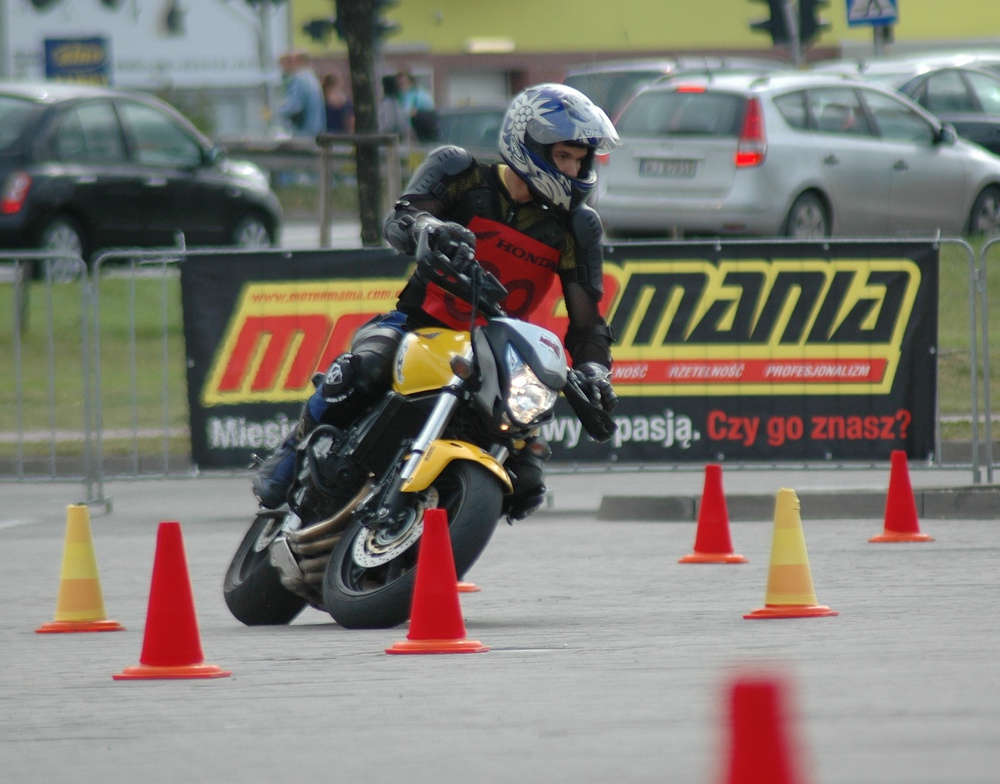
Gymkhana in Poland

Motorcycle Gymkhana is relatively accessible to beginners, as riders need little equipment and no special license to participate. Events are usually held on closed courses such as driving schools, parking lots, small circuits, or other paved areas. The course layout is designed by the organizer which is different for each event.

The riders generally use only first and second gear because of the course's tight turns. The speed range is therefore usually low or moderate.

Because of the tight course layout of Gymkhana, smaller and lighter motorcycles often have an advantage over larger ones. However, courses may include long straight sections in addition to tight turns, so various sizes and styles of machines are potential contenders.

Motorcycle Gymkhana requires technique, ability, knowledge, and motorcycle experience. Riders must know not only the techniques of acceleration, braking, handling, and weight transfer but also how to tune the machine to maximize performance.

== Requirements for machines ==
Motorcycles used in gymkhana must be street-legal. A machine must have one wheel at the front and one wheel at the rear. The regulations do not place any limitations on engine displacement nor on styles such as naked, super-sports, cruisers, scooters, or on-road versus off-road. Tires must be street legal, so racing tires such as dry slicks and supermoto slicks are not allowed. Treads must be deep enough, and worn-out tires are not allowed. Exhaust noise is limited to 100 dB. There must be no sharp edges at the end of handlebars, levers, pedals, or any other projections.

Bikes may be customized freely, provided the above conditions are met. For example, many participants place the handlebars in the upper position for better control, change the front and/or rear sprockets to improve acceleration, change the exhaust system, or eliminate fairings to reduce weight.

== Equipment ==
Riders are generally required to wear a full-face, racing-style motorcycle helmet. Open-face and half helmets are not recommended. Motorcycle gloves and elbow protectors are compulsory, and protectors for shoulders, chest, and back are recommended. Other choices for protection are a leather jacket or a leather racing suit with built-in protectors. On the lower body, riders must wear knee protectors on pants. Protectors for hips and shins are also recommended. Riders may wear boots without laces or racing boots.

== Authorized associations ==
JAGE (Japan Autoby Gymkhana Edifice) is the motorcycle gymkhana association in Japan, which organizes events known as "Official Events", at which all of the participants are classified under JAGE's authorization criteria.

After JAGE released "Welcome to the World of Moto Gymkhana" in English as well as Japanese, the popularity of Moto Gymkhana outside Japan has steadily grown. In March 2011, the Moto Gymkhana Association was set up in the UK. Its primary aims are to run Moto Gymkhana in the UK and to promote the sport to the rest of the non-Japanese-speaking world. In 2012, it is running an eight-round national championship in the UK, as well as Moto Gymkhana Experiences to raise the profile of the sport. Moto gymkhana experience days are three- or four-hour try-out sessions run by the national organization or local clubs.

At the same time, Honda Poland launched a Moto Gymkhana competition series to promote their motorcycles. This series uses different timing and ranking rules from JAGE competitions.

The Moto Gymkhana Association of North America was set up in Toronto, Ontario, Canada, in 2012. Their first event, "Rock the Red", was held on 15 July 2012 at Honda Canada's headquarters.

The formation of the American Motorcycle Gymkhana Riders Association took place in 2011, in Birmingham, Alabama. The first event took place in June, and the sport has been growing in the U.S. since. The American version of motorcycle gymkhana focuses on skill development with a concentration on steering and braking and less emphasis on racing and the competitive nature of timed events.

M Gymkhana was established in Southern California in 2012, with its first event held in October of that year at the Bob Hope Airport in Southern California. Following the same guidelines/rules established by JAGE, M Gymkhana runs both moto gymkhana timed competitions, as well as "experience day" events as an introductory course for those who are new to the sport of motorcycle gymkhana. The establishment of M Gymkhana in the Southern California market was primarily for the purpose of not only spreading the moto gymkhana mantra by growing the sport in the U.S. but also spreading the skills that are gained through moto gymkhana riding to motorcycle enthusiasts in one of the largest motorcycle markets in the U.S.

The Moto Gymkhana Club of Australia (MGCA) was formed in 2016 upon affiliation with the Moto Gymkhana Association UK. The MGCA is a Division of the Australian Motorcyclist Association (AMA), which sanctioned the first practice and play event soon after affiliation. MGCA events can be organized by manufacturers/ dealers, to MGCA Groups and Members, including rounds of the MGCA National Series.

Moto Gymkhana was founded in the Middle East by François Salameh in March 2016, after his visit to Japan and his cooperation with the Japanese Moto Gymkhana Association (JAGE)

== Classification ==
=== Seeded classes ===
- A Class: Riders who recorded less than 105% of the fastest time in an "Official Event", have acquired enough series ranking points, and have been approved for A Class by an organizer.
- B Class: Other riders who recorded less than 105% of the fastest time in an "Official Event".
- C1 Class: Riders who recorded less than 110% of the fastest time in an "Official Event".
- C2 Class: Riders who recorded less than 115% of the fastest time in an "Official Event".

=== Non-seeded novice classes ===
- NO Class: Men who have not recorded less than 115% of the fastest time in an "Official Event", and beginners with "Customized" motorbikes.
- NN Class: Men who have not recorded less than 115% of the fastest time in an "Official Event", and beginners with "non-customized" motorbikes.
- NL Class: Women who have not recorded less than 115% of the fastest time in an "Official Event", and beginners.

=== SB class ===
SB Class is applied only to seeded larger bikes that have over 700cc displacement. Their results are ordered among 'SB Class's too. Furthermore, they can get Series Ranking Points (among 'SB Class's) when recorded less than 107%.

=== Movement between classes ===
- A rider who has been authorized as a member of a Class will never be relegated from that Class.
- A rider who has been promoted to B/C1/C2 can compete in the new class from the next event.
- A rider who has been promoted to A class can compete as an A-class rider from the first event of next year, because A class is organized annually.

== Courses ==
There are three separate courses at an event. One is a short course for warm-up, to allow riders to adjust themselves to their motorbikes and to warm up tires before a timed run. A second warm-up course is the figure-of-eight turning area near the starting point, for tight runs round the cones. The third is the course for timed runs. Gymkhana has various distinct sections such as slalom, figure-of-eight turns, circles, lines to go through, and 180-degree turns. The cones placed on the courses are usually 45 cm or less in height, but they can sometimes be 70 cm.

== Clubs ==
Switzerland: Moto Gymkhana » Moto Gymkhana Swiss

== See also ==
- Autocross (United States)
- Autoslalom
- Autotesting
- Gymkhana
- Gymkhana Grid
- Motorkhana
- Motorcycle trials
