= Autocross =

Type of motorsport

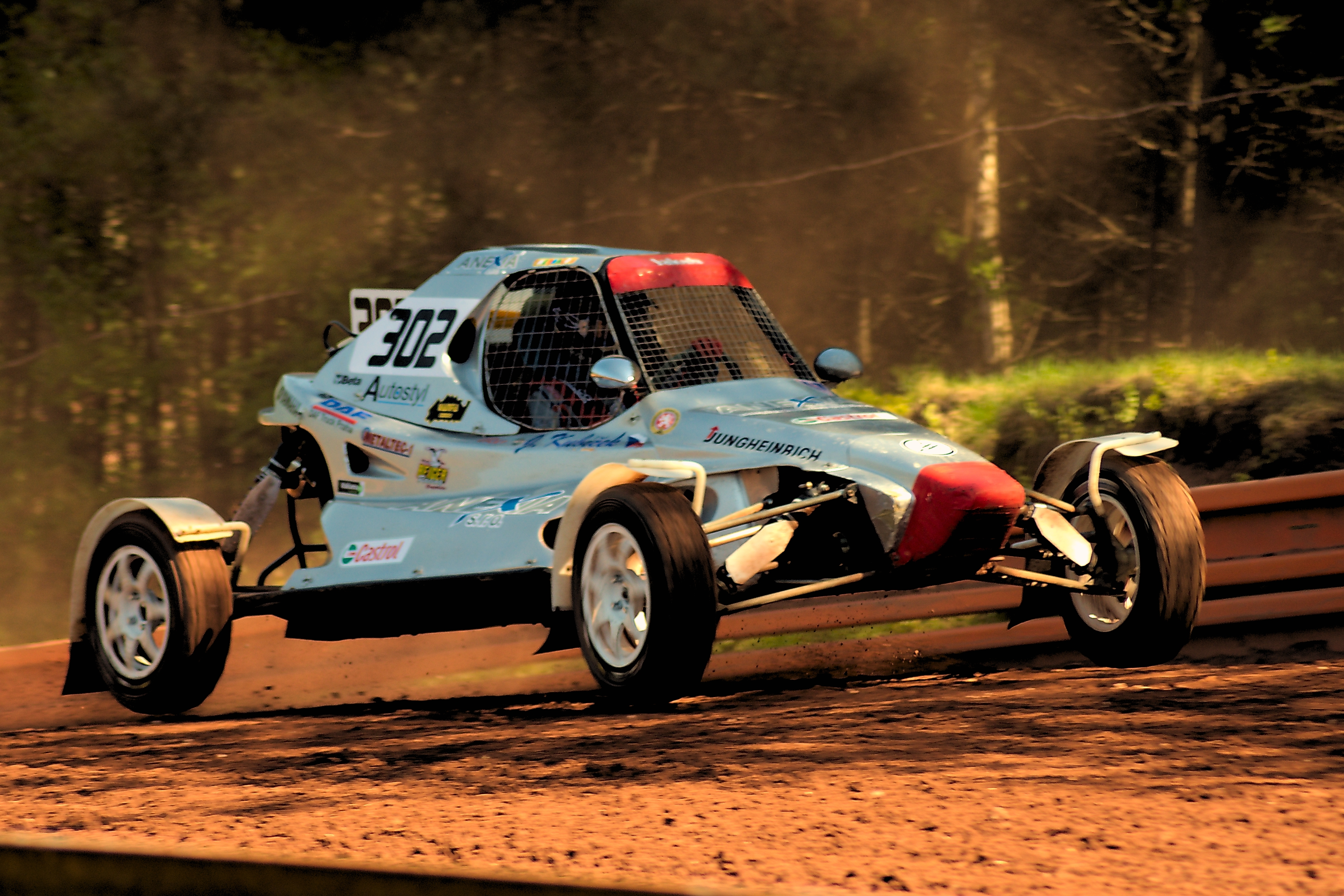
A cross car on a Czech autocross course

Autocross is a form of motorsport in which competitors are timed to complete a short course using automobiles on a dirt or grass surface, except where sealed surfaces are used in the United States. Rules vary according to the governing or sanctioning body, such as the length of the course, the number of permitted attempts, or whether competitors start the course individually at intervals or at the same time as others. In this latter form, Autocross differs from other forms of motor racing by using a system of heats or alternative timing methods for the classification rather than racing for position and declaring the first across the finish line as the winner.

Autocross began in the United Kingdom in the early 1950s at an amateur level within local motor clubs using temporary courses marked on grassy fields to not cause damage to any cars. The creator of rallycross, Robert Reed, wanted a version of autocross with more spectator-appeal to be made for television, using professional racing and rally drivers and teams; and courses featuring jumps, sharper corners and a mixture of sealed and unsealed surfaces.

In the United States, the motorsport called autocross is more like the UK and European sport of autotesting or autoslalom, and what is called rallycross in the US is more like what the UK and Europe call autocross. The Sports Car Club of America (SCCA) publishes rules for autocross, which are also used by many independent clubs, as well as hosting national events and championships within its Solo branded series. The National Auto Sport Association brands its version of US-style autocross as NASA-X, Both take place on sealed asphalt or concrete surfaces, one car at a time running against the clock, with traffic cones defining the path to be driven, and an emphasis on car handling and precision manoeuvring.

Autocross courses can be as short as 800 metres or several kilometres long. Courses may be temporary and marked by traffic cones which can be reconfigured during events, or be permanent tracks with approval by a motorsport body.

Events typically have many classes that allow almost any vehicle, from production touring cars to purpose-built racing cars. The international body for autocross, the FIA, and the French body, FFSA, both provide technical specifications for cross cars, lightweight buggy cars.

== Australia ==
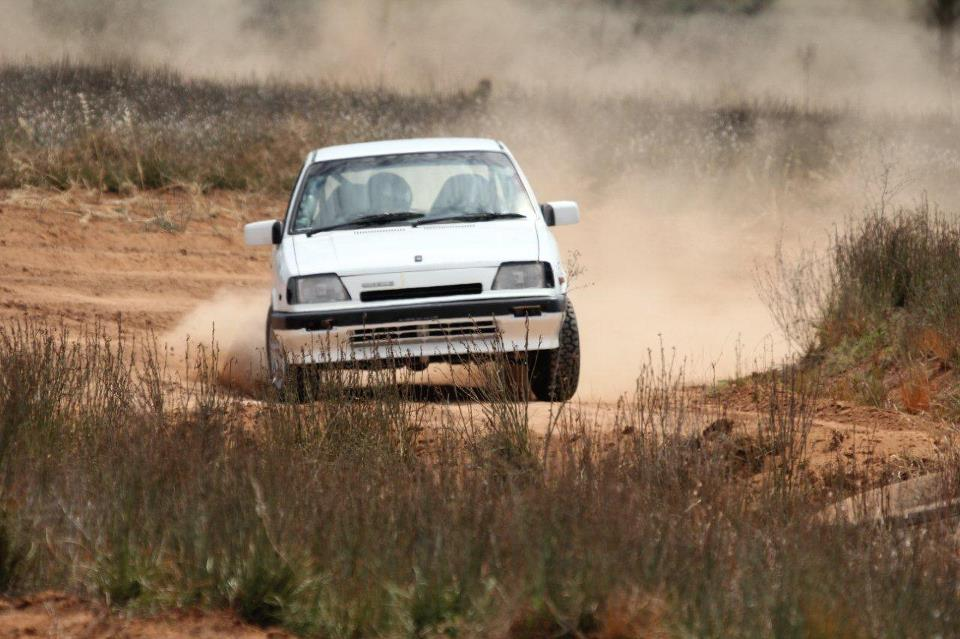
A Swift GTI participating in an Australian autocross event

Autocross is sanctioned in Australia by MotorSport Australia, where it is defined as an event held on a course less than four kilometers long. Vehicles are timed during each pass of the course and results are typically tallied over a number passes. Eligible vehicles include regular road-going cars, purpose-built buggies and full racing or rallying-prepared machines. Many events allow junior participants as low as 14 years old.

== United States ==
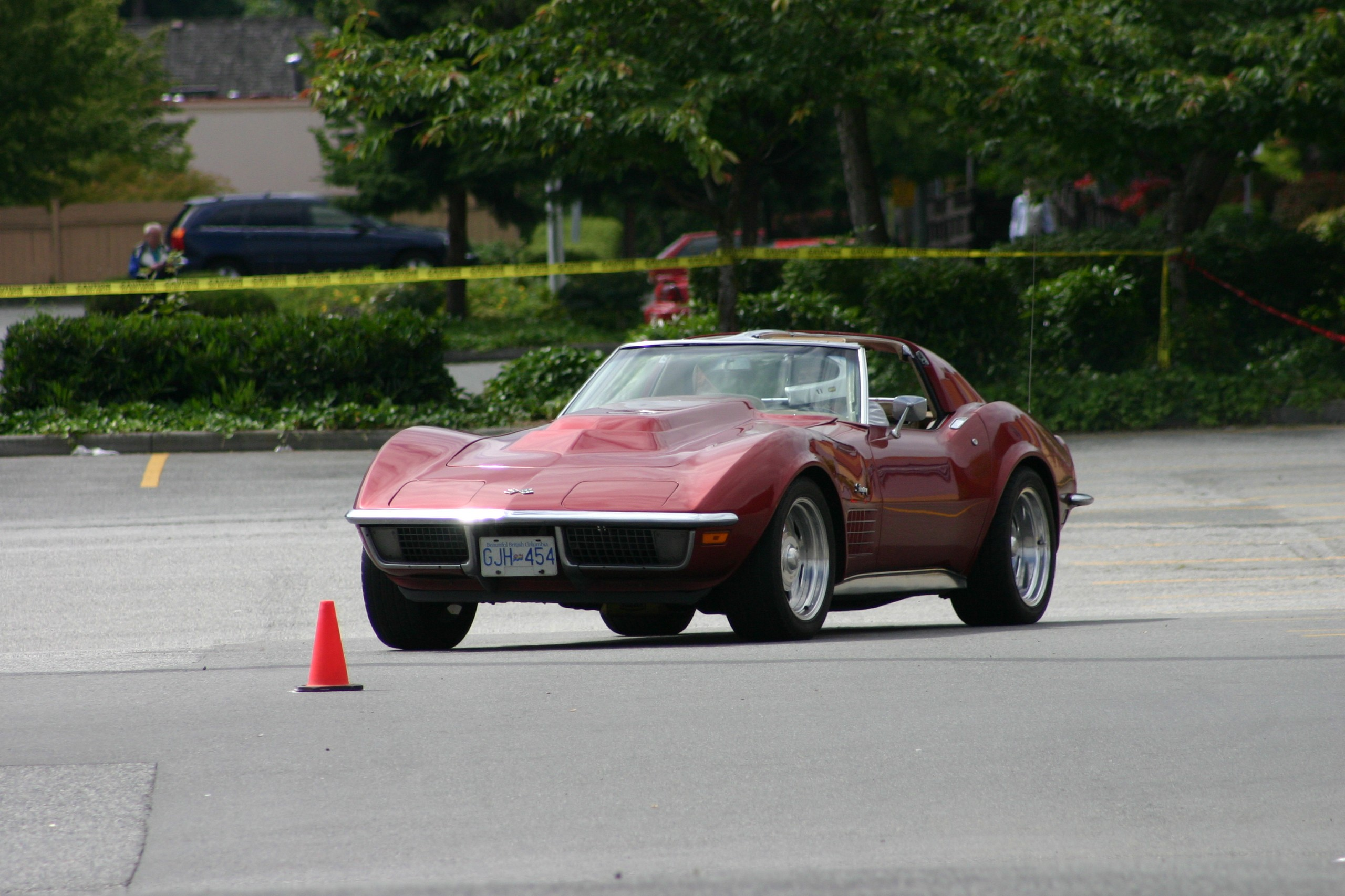
A 1970 Corvette participating in an autocross

American autocross events (also called "Solo", Auto-x" or "Autoslalom") are typically held on flat, paved surfaces such as parking lots or airport tarmacs, and usually have a new course for each event, marked by traffic cones.

Autocross is one of the most accessible and affordable forms of motorsport, and autocross events are open to novices. Because autocross events use rubber traffic cones to define the course, and are typically run on paved surfaces with few obstructions, the hazards and barriers to entry are low. While speeds are generally no greater than those encountered in legal highway driving, the combination of concentration and precision manoeuvring gives drivers an experience similar to that of a full road course race.

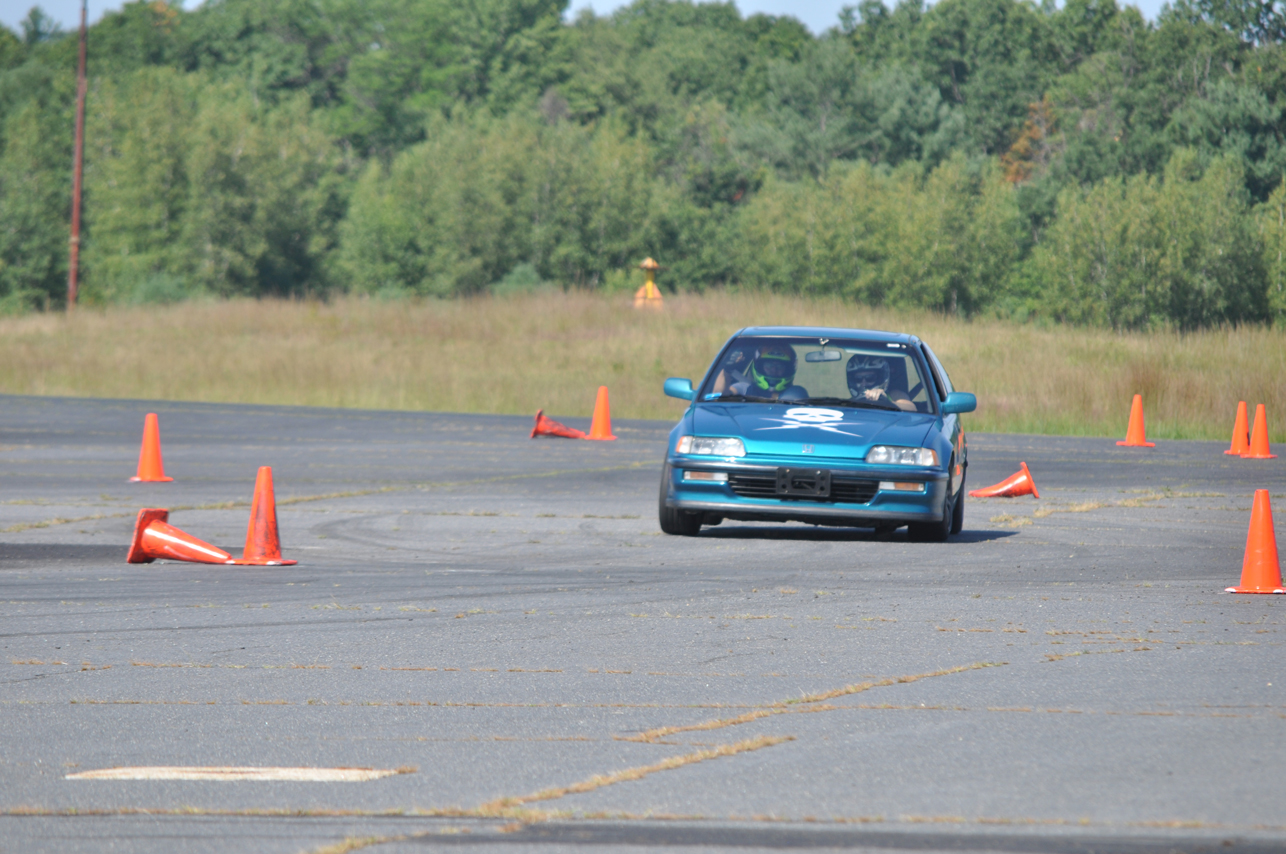
Drivers must navigate a series of turns defined by traffic cones

Competitors range from casual participants driving their commuter vehicles, to dedicated competitors driving purpose-built cars with special tires. There are classes accommodating varying degrees of car modification, as well as classes specifically for women and children.

Many events are open to spectators. Many local car clubs offer autocross novice driving schools to help drivers feel comfortable before a regular event.

The SCCA National Championship is held in September in the Midwest. Currently (2024 and prior) held in Lincoln, Nebraska. The event takes place over 4 days with half the drivers competing on the first two days and half the last two days. Two different courses are driven with winners determined by combining best times from both courses. It is considered the largest amateur motorsport racing event in the world; for 2024, registration was capped at 1,300 drivers with a number of additional people on a wait list.

== United Kingdom ==
In the United Kingdom, autocrosses are typically held on a grass or stubble surface. Cars compete individually against the clock, although more than one car may start at the same time if the circuit is long enough and wide enough. Because the course is usually bumpy and there is a risk of contact with other cars, most competitors use specially prepared cars (which vary from very inexpensive to specially engineered racers) brought on trailers. Events are usually held on a region-wide basis, with Motorsport UK overseeing rules and regulations.

Some people choose to start singularly, particularly if they compete in a rally car. The sport is relatively low risk as there is or should be nothing to hit. However, if you wish, you may do double car starts. Most people opt for this, although some competitors choose to do 3 and 4 car starts whilst still competing against the clock.

=== History ===
The British autocross began in the early 1950s when clubs organized timed runs around courses set on farmers' fields. By 1954, Taunton MC organized the first ever autocross series in the United Kingdom. This, however, was only repeated in 1959 when the club was awarded the permit to hold the British National Autocross event. Shortly, thereafter, the sporting event caught on and, by 1963, the ASWMC Autocross Championship was finally launched.

Presently, there are many local clubs which host across the UK, although the main regions hosting Autocross events are: AEMC for East Anglia, ANECCC - North East, and, the ASWMC for the South-West region. The ASWMC, for its part, now has 13 different Championships, which attract around 250 contenders each year. The regional autocross events also have different formats. For instance, the South West follows the traditional two-car start, except for the 4 abreast Sandocross that used to run at Weston-super-Mare, while the North East region involves 4-car autocross.

== Soviet Union ==
In the Soviet Union, autocross dates back to 1949 when competitions were held for light trucks as well as passenger cars. The first competitions resembled an offroad race over a 20-40km course, but since then races shortened and purpose built tracks were established. In 1970s and 1980s autocross was among the most popular motorsport disciplines in Soviet Union with hundreds of racing tracks and various classes of trucks, light cars and purpose built buggies competing. Most classes were effectively one-make classes, with few performance upgrades available, which together with wide state support made autocross popular and easily accessible to enthusiasts.

== FIA European Autocross Championship ==
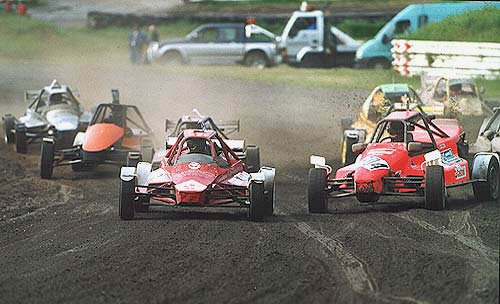
Start of a final of the 2004 German Autocross Championship round at the Estering at Buxtehude

Cars compete against the clock, and start at the same time. A well attended international series is the FIA European Championship for Autocross Drivers. The FIA European Autocross Championship is a racing competition held on natural terrain circuits with unsealed surfaces ranging from 800 to 1,400 metres in length. Up to 10 cars race simultaneously in qualifying heats, followed by two semi-finals and a final race. It features different categories for "buggies", including SuperBuggy, Buggy1600, and JuniorBuggy. Events also host rounds of the FIA European Cross Car Championship and FIA Cross Car Academy Trophy for younger drivers aged between 13 and 16 years old.

FIA European Autocross Championship was established as an FIA European Cup in 1977 and was upgraded to an FIA European Championship in 1982. Since 2021, a selection of the ten FIA European Autocross Championship events also host rounds of the FIA European Cross Car Championship (7 competitions in 2022) and the FIA Cross Car Academy Trophy (5 competitions in 2022, reserved for drivers aged 13 to 16).

The championship is run on circuits on natural terrain, with any type of unsealed surface, from 800 to 1,400 metres in length. Autocross races involve a maximum of 10 cars on track simultaneously and consist of a succession of qualifying heats leading to two semi-finals and a final.

The championship has a series of events throughout the year in various locations. For example, in 2022, the events were held in places like Seelow, Vilkyčiai, Nová Paka, Saint-Georges-de-Montaigu, Přerov, Saint-Igny de Vers, Maggiora, and Mollerussa.

== Related sports ==
In the US, both autocross and slalom are disciplines included in the SCCA's branded time trial series, Solo, and the terms are commonly used interchangeably. Other regions of the world use different names. Parts of Canada and Eastern Europe (including Russia, Ukraine, and Moldova) have an autoslalom discipline and events. In the United Kingdom, the closest discipline to autocross is known as autosolo. In Malaysia and Thailand it is known as autokhana.

Motorkhana (Australia and New Zealand) and autotesting (the UK and Ireland) are also similar disciplines. With speeds rarely exceeding 40 mph (60 km/h), motorkhana and autotesting are slower than American autocross, require hand-braking, and have sections that must be navigated in reverse. Autocross speeds can exceed 60 mph (100 km/h), and courses requiring drivers to reverse are generally prohibited. Hand-braking is also uncommon, and not usually necessary on a typical autocross course.

They are similar to the Japanese gymkhana, another type of handling competition. Gymkhanas are tighter than motorkhanas and autotests, with numerous 360-degree turns around cones and courses which loop back on themselves. Fast times require sliding, and resembles a combination of autocross and drifting. Gymkhana does not usually require backing up. In ProSolo, an SCCA-sanctioned programme of autocross, two cars run side by side on mirror-image courses after starting at a "Christmas tree" starting system similar to that used in drag racing.
