= Autotesting =

Driving skill tests

Autotesting involves a series of tests, generally around traffic cones, to measure precision driving skill.

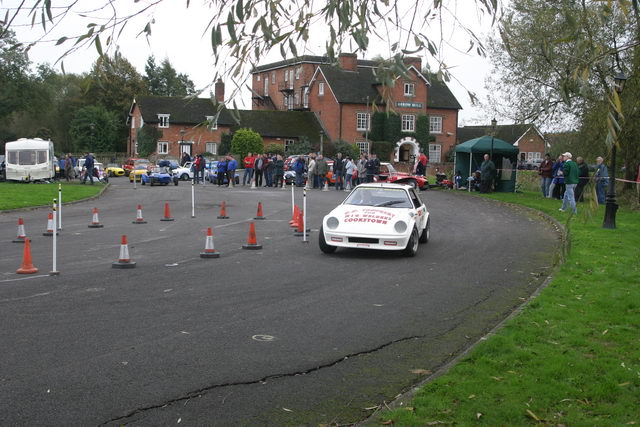
A car performing autotests on tarmac in the UK

The tests often include stopping with the front and rear wheels straddling a line, and always end stopping in a garage (usually marked out with cones). Sections of each test are usually completed in reverse. Cars involved can be standard road cars or ones specially built for autotest.

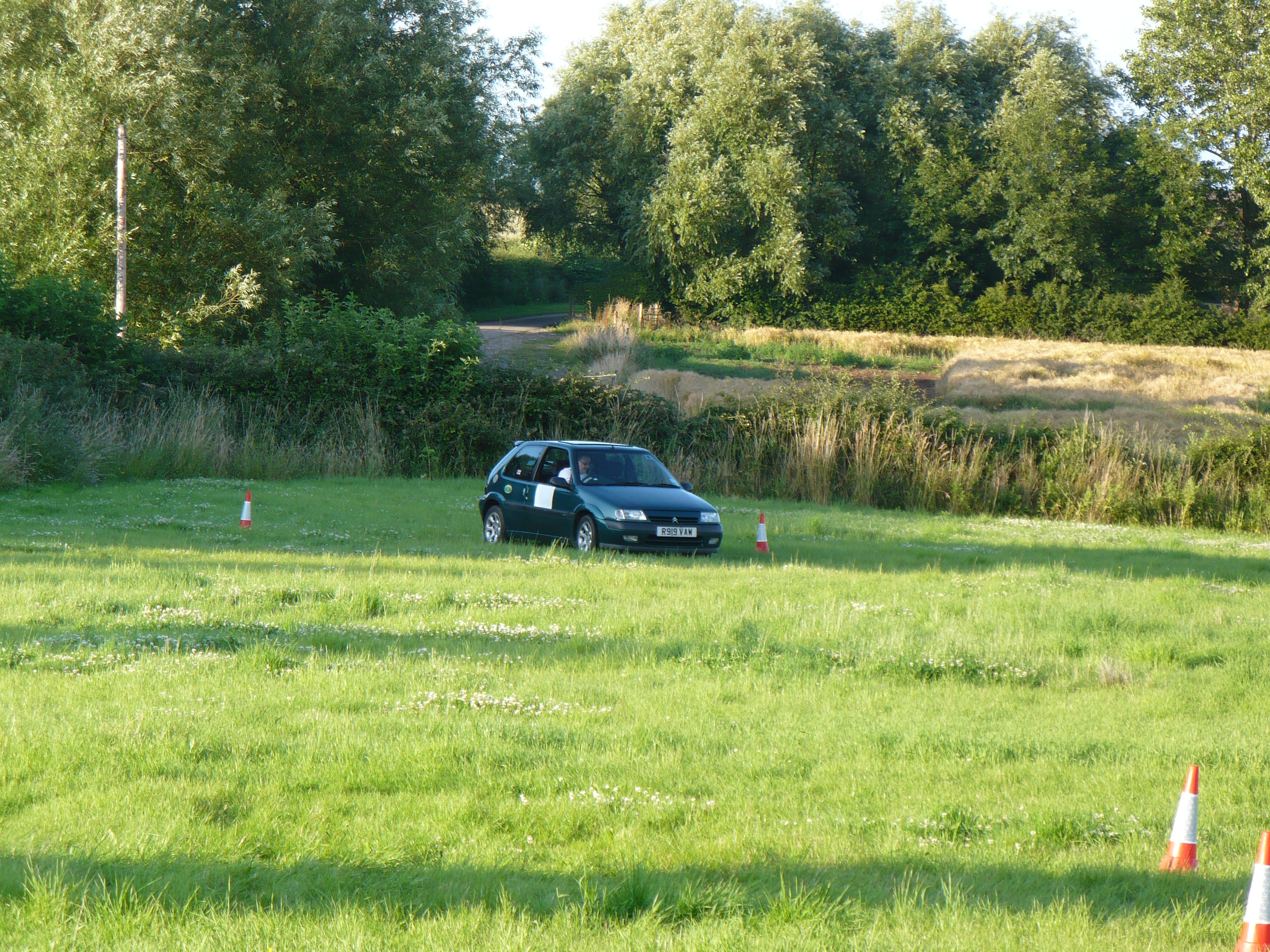
A car performing autotests on grass surface in the UK

Autotests can take place on either grass or hard surface. Grass Autotests are popular for club events as they are more gentle on tires and transmissions. Many Clubs run their Grass autotests without any reversing. Championship Autotests in the UK are normally on a hard surface.

Each event consists of between three and six tests, with each test completed twice with the faster of the two counting for the results. The tests are timed with a stopwatch, with penalties of 10 seconds given for each cone hit. A wrong turn in a test results in a maximum time, which is usually 30 seconds slower than the fastest time in class. The winner is the driver who completes the tests in the shortest time (including penalties). Each test usually takes around a minute to complete, and often turns into a test of memory as well as driver skill. Most of the autotest layouts are symmetrical and the drivers do get the chance to walk the course.

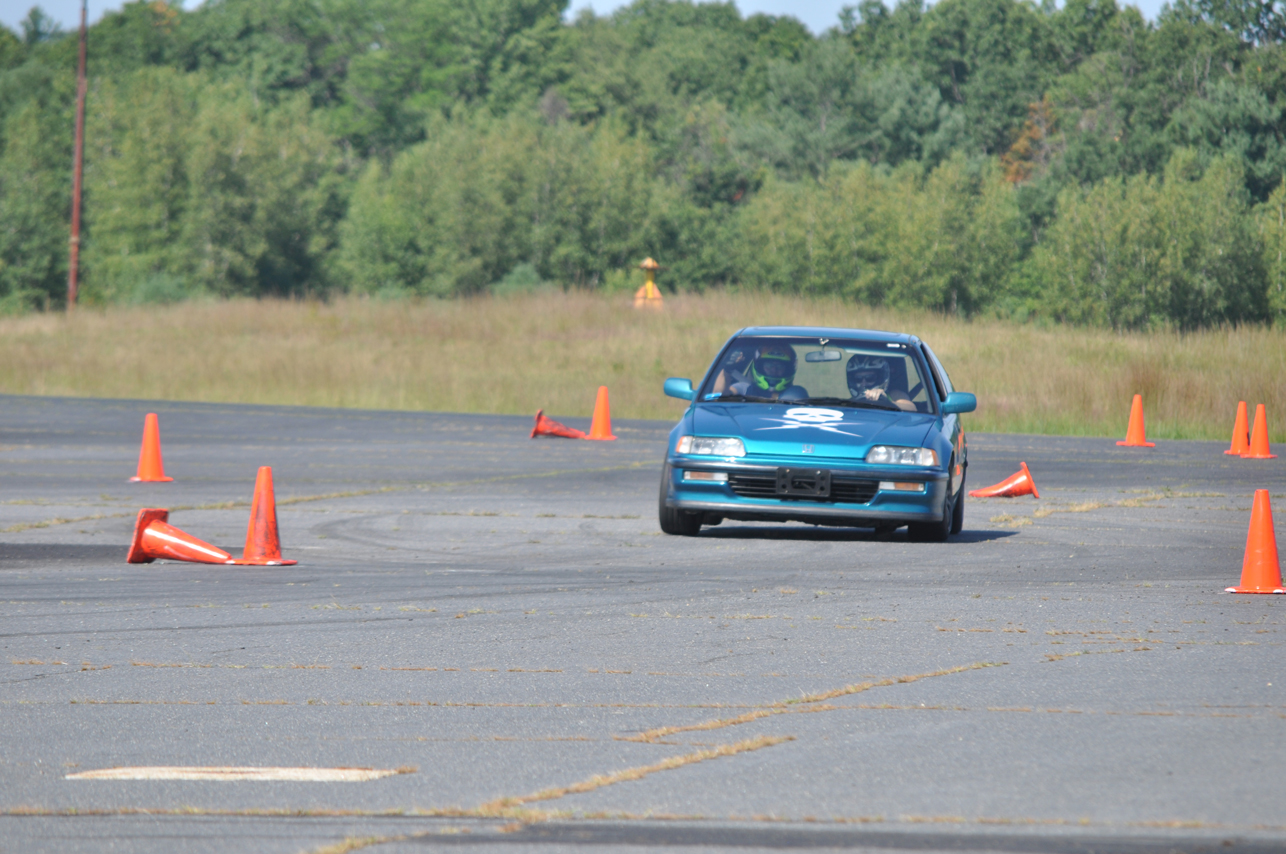
A car performing autotests (autocross) on tarmac in the US

Autotests are conducted in the UK and Ireland and are similar to Motorkhana in Australia and New Zealand. Cars compete one at a time and speeds are low so safety is high. Autotesting is also a little similar to autocrossing in the US, but the slower speeds, frequent handbrake turns and reversing are all major points of difference.

Important skills to learn for autotesting include:

- The Handbrake turn
- The J-turn or Reverse Flick
- Reversing at speed

== See also ==
- Autosolo: forwards only autotesting
- Autocross (United States)
- Autoslalom
- Gymkhana
- Gymkhana Grid
- Motorkhana
- Motorcycle trials
- Motorcycle Gymkhana
