= Autosolo =

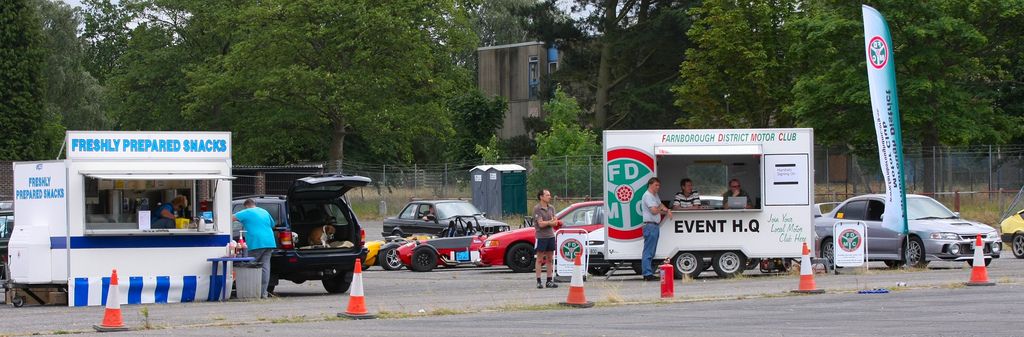
A view of the Start line and Event Control at an Autosolo event.

AutoSolo in the United Kingdom is a form of motorsport based around the principles of autotesting, with the main differences being that the tests are run in a forward direction only and are usually slightly faster and more open than traditional autotests. Courses are usually larger than those for autotesting, and as the courses are laid out to run in one direction, it is common for more than one car to be on the course at the same time.

Autosolos are similar to the popular American motorsport of autocross also formerly known as Solo2. Solo2 is a registered service mark of the Sports Car Club of America (SCCA). SCCA now refers to this sport simply as "Solo". The generic term used in the US is "autocross".

Autosolos are governed by Motorsport UK and regulations for them are listed under 'Part M Autotests' of the 'Blue Book'.
