= Motorsport =

Sport primarily involving the use of motorised vehicles

- Formula 1 image
- Highest governing body: FIA (four-wheel racing); FIM (two-wheel racing); UIM (boat racing); FAI (plane racing)
- First event: 1894

Characteristics
- Glossary: Glossary of motorsport terms

Presence
- Country or region: International

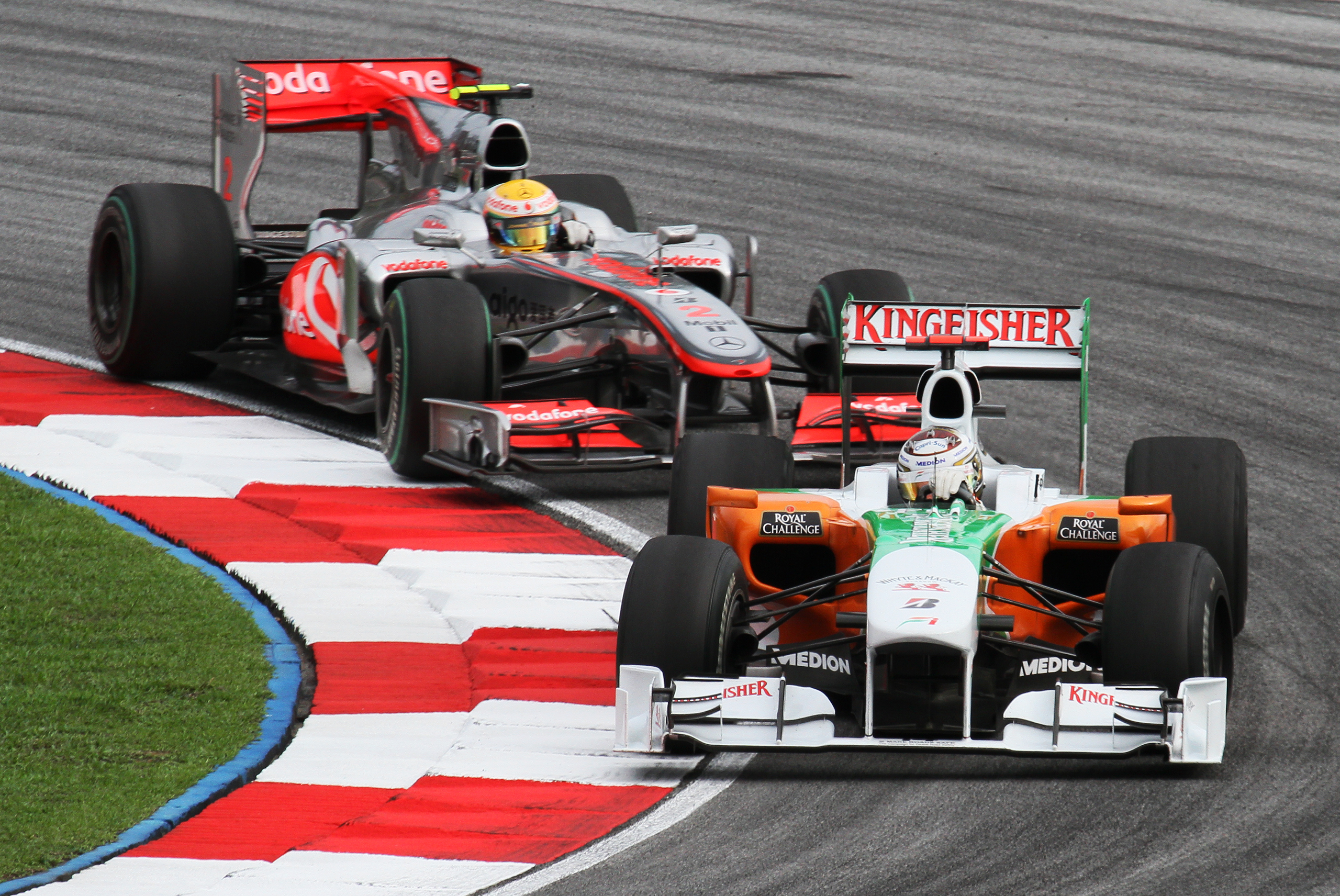
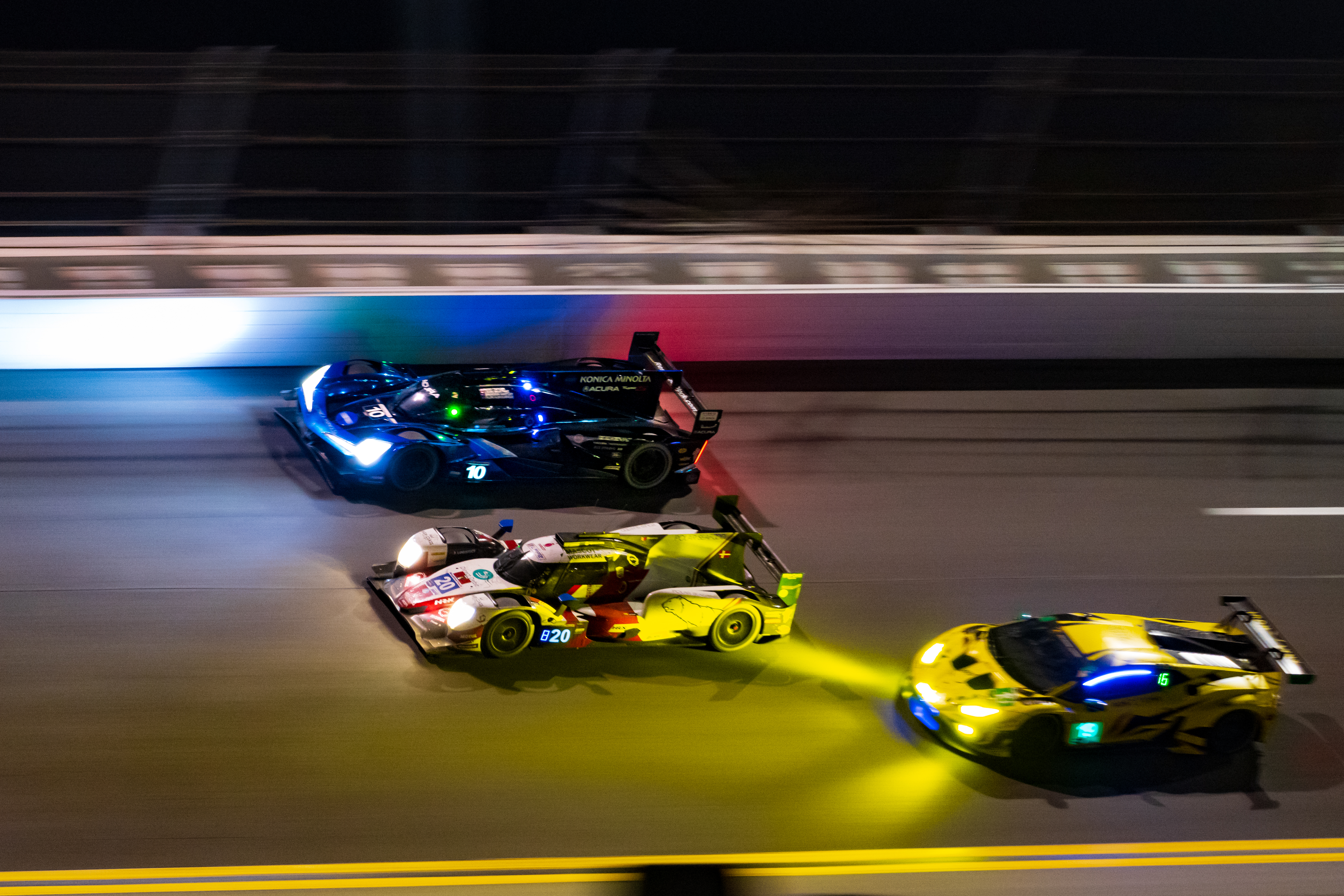
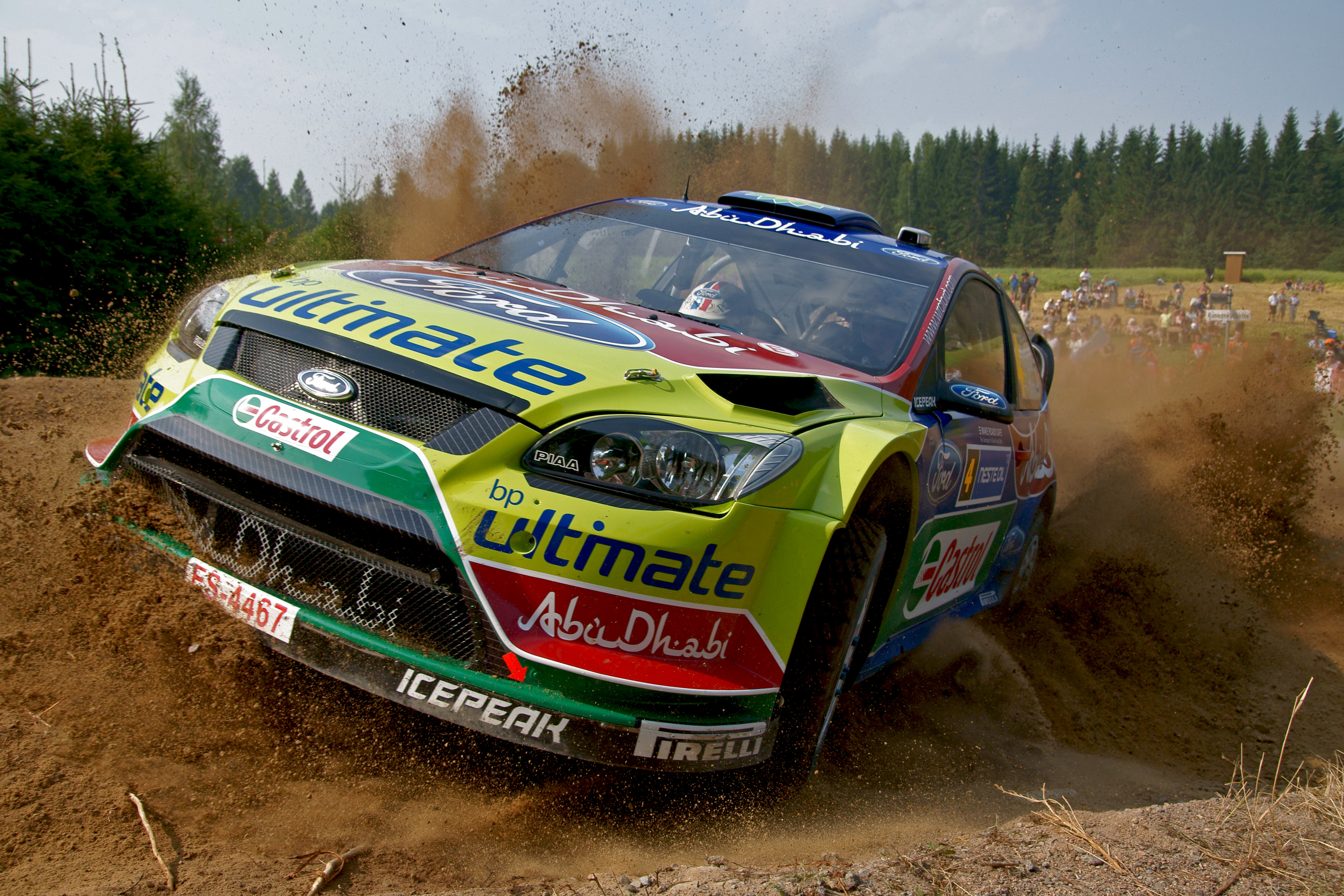
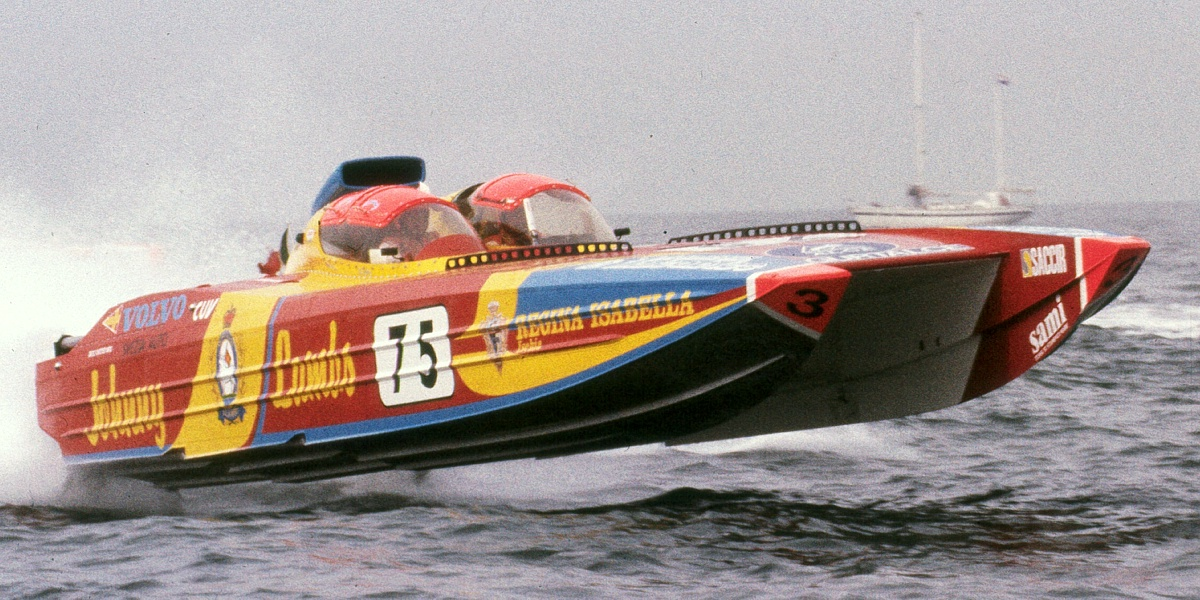
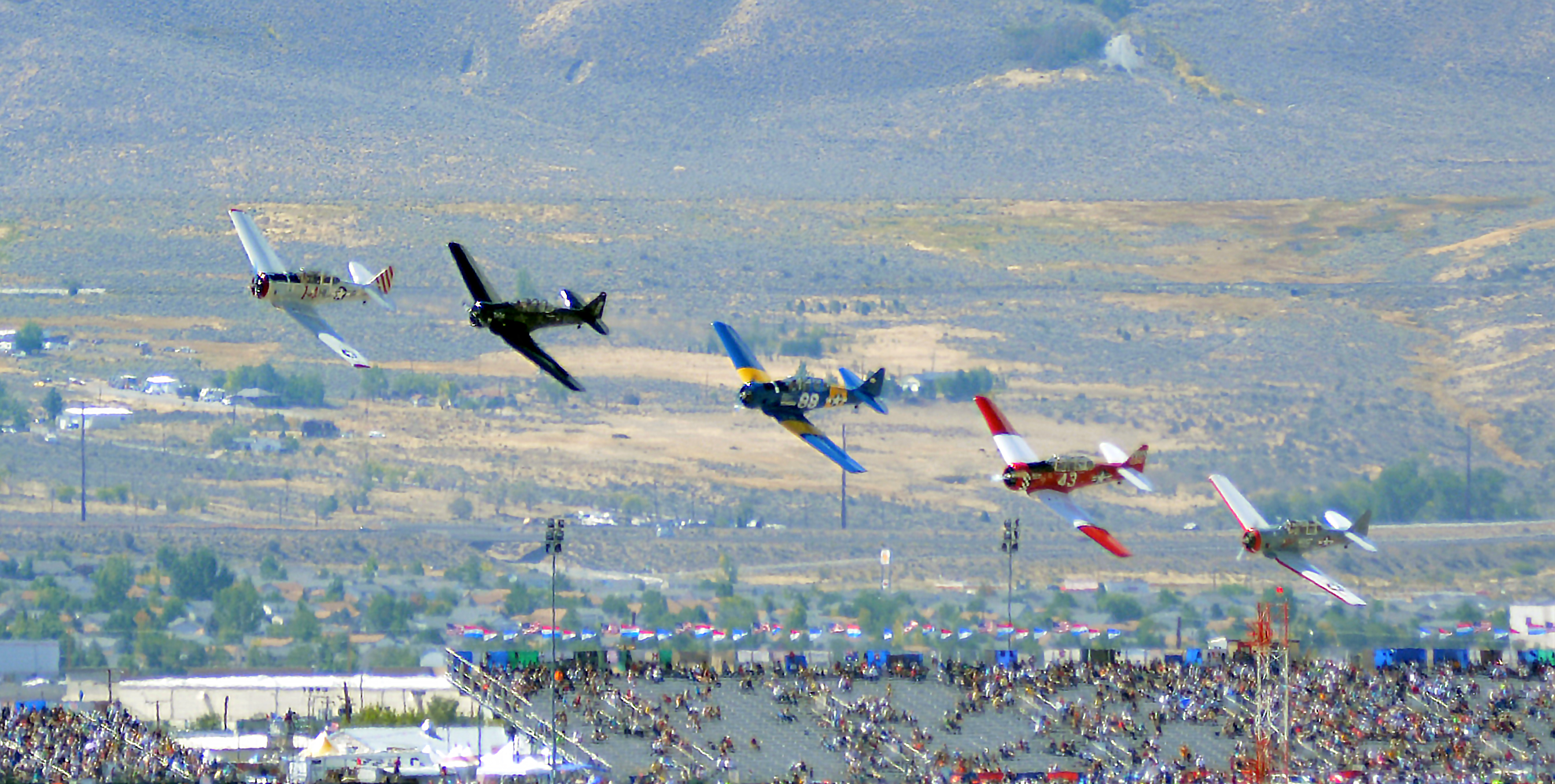

Motorsport (also called motorsports or powersports) are sporting events, competitions and related activities that primarily involve the use of automobiles, motorcycles, motorboats and powered aircraft. For each of these vehicle types, the more specific terms automobile sport, motorcycle sport, power boating and air sports are used commonly, or officially by organisers and governing bodies.

Different manifestations of motorsport with their own objectives and specific rules are called disciplines. Examples include circuit racing, rallying and trials. Governing bodies, also called sanctioning bodies, often have general rules for each discipline, but allow supplementary rules to define the character of a particular competition, series or championship. Groups of these are often categorised informally, such as by vehicle type, surface type or propulsion method. Examples of categories within a discipline are formula racing, stock car racing, touring car racing, sports car racing, etc.

== History ==
The first prearranged match race of two self-powered road vehicles over a prescribed route occurred in the north west of England at 4:30 A.M. on August 30, 1867, between Ashton-under-Lyne and Old Trafford, Manchester, a distance of eight miles. It was won by the locomotive of Isaac Watt Boulton, one of six he said he had run over the years, perhaps driven by his 22-year-old son, James W. The race was against Daniel Adamson's carriage, likely the one made for Mr. Schmidt and perhaps driven by Mr. Schmidt himself. The reports do not indicate who was driving, since both were violating the red-flag law then fully in force. Boulton's carriage was developed from a scrapped John Bridge Adams light-rail vehicle. These were solid fired steam carriages. This event and the details of the vehicles are recorded in the contemporary press, The Engineer, and in Fletcher's books.

The Wisconsin legislature passed an act in 1875 offering a substantial purse for the first US motor race, which was run on July 16, 1878, over a 200-mile course from Green Bay to Appleton, Oshkosh, Waupon, Watertown, Fort Atkinson and Janesville, then turning north and ending in Madison. Only two actually competed: the Oshkosh and the Green Bay (the machines were referred to by their town of origin). This is examined and illustrated in detail in The Great Race of 1878 by Richard Backus, Farm Collector, May/June 2004.

In 1894, the French newspaper Le Petit Journal organised a contest for horseless carriages featuring a run from Paris to Rouen. This is widely accepted as the world's first motorsport event, and was the first to involve what would become known as automobiles. On 28 November 1895, the Chicago Times-Herald race, running from Chicago to Evanston and back, a distance of sixty miles, was held. This is believed to be the first motorsport event in the United States of America. In 1900, the Gordon Bennett Cup was established.

Motorsport was a demonstration event at the 1900 Summer Olympics.

Following World War I, European countries organised Grand Prix races over closed courses. In the United States, dirt track racing became popular.

After World War II, the Grand Prix circuit became more formally organised. In the United States, stock car racing and drag racing became firmly established.

== Automobile sport ==
=== Governing bodies ===
The Fédération Internationale de l'Automobile (FIA), formed in 1904, is the oldest and most prominent international governing body. It claims to be the sole international motor sporting authority for automobiles and other land vehicles with four or more wheels, whilst acknowledging the authority of the Fédération Internationale de Motocyclisme (FIM) over vehicles with one to three wheels, which FIM calls motorcycle sport.

FIM and FIA are both recognised as international sports federations by the International Olympic Committee.

==== FIA hierarchy ====
Within the FIA's structure, each affiliated National Sporting Authority (ASN) is recognised as the sole authority in their nation. Permission of the ASNs must be obtained to organise events using their rules, and their licenses must be held by participants. Not all ASNs function in the same manner, some are private companies such as Motorsport UK, some are supported by the state such as France's FFSA, or in the case of the US's ACCUS, a council of sanctioning bodies is the national representative at FIA meetings.

ASNs, their affiliated clubs or independent commercial promotors organise motorsport events which often include competitions. A collective of events is called a series, and a grouping of competitions often forms the basis of a championship, cup or trophy.

Hierarchy of the Fédération Internationale de l'Automobile (showing selected nations)
International	National Sporting Authority	ASN Members/Associates etc
FIA	(Croatia) Croatian Auto Club	
FIA	(Germany) Deutscher Motor Sport Bund	
FIA	(Brazil) Brazilian Automobile Confederation	
FIA	(United Kingdom) Motorsport UK	BRDC (British GP), BARC (BTCC), BRSCC (British GT), et al.
FIA	Motorsport Australia	Regional associations of motor clubs, motor/driver/racing clubs
FIA	MotorSport New Zealand	Regional associations of motor clubs, motor/driver/racing clubs
FIA	(Republic of Ireland) Motorsport Ireland	Regional associations of motor clubs, motor/driver/racing clubs
FIA	(Canada) Sports Development Group	Regional associations of motor clubs, motor/driver/racing clubs
FIA	(France) FFSA	ACO (24 Hours of Le Mans) …
FIA	(United States) ACCUS	IMSA, IndyCar, NASCAR, NHRA, SCCA, USAC

==== Unaffiliated automobile sport bodies ====
Not all nations have a sporting authority affiliated with the FIA, some disciplines may not fall within the FIA's remit of control, or organisations may choose to ignore the claim of the authority of others. Examples include banger racing and stock car racing in the United Kingdom which are claimed by both the Oval Racing Council and the National Stock Car Association, despite the claim by the FIA affiliated ASN, Motorsport UK, to be the "governing body of all four-wheel motorsport in the UK". SCORE International, the National Auto Sport Association and the National Off-Road Racing Association of the United States are also not members of the FIA affiliation system but may work with members for international matters.

=== Racing ===
Although English dictionaries do not unanimously agree and singularly define that a race is between competitors running head-to-head, in its International Sporting Code, the FIA defines racing as two or more cars competing on the same course simultaneously.

==== Circuit racing ====
Circuit racing takes place on sealed-surface courses at permanent autodromes or on temporary street circuits. Competitors race over a set number of laps of the circuit with the winner being the first to finish, or for a set length of time with the winner having completed the highest number of laps, with others classified subsequently.

Circuit racing replaced point-to-point (city-to-city) racing early in the history of motorsport, for both spectator appeal and as safety concerns brought in regulation of the sport, forcing organisers to use closed, marshalled and policed circuits on closed public roads. Aspendale Racecourse in Australia in 1906 was the first purpose-built motor racing track in the world. After which, permanent autodromes popularly replaced circuits on public roads.

In North America, the term road racing is used to describe racing and courses that have origins in racing on public highways; distinguished from oval racing, which has origins at purpose-built speedways using concrete or wooden boards.

- Single-seater racing involves cars with minimal chassis and bodywork material, with capacity only for the driver and necessary mechanical components. As the wheels protrude from the body of the car these thorough race cars are also known as open-wheel cars.
  - Formula racing is an informal collection of series that use a specific set of rules for race car design. The most prevalent international series are Formula One and Formula Two. Others include Formula 3, Formula Ford, Formula Renault, Formula Palmer Audi, Super Formula and Formula Four. Former 'Formula' series include Formula 5000, GP2 and GP3.
  - Formula One is an international championship governed by the FIA and currently promoted by the privately owned company, Formula One Group. The regulations contain a strict set of rules which govern vehicle power, weight, size and design. The rules do allow for some variation however.
  - Formula E is a championship of open-wheel racing that uses only electric-powered cars. The series was conceived in 2012 and the inaugural championship started in Beijing on 13 September 2014. The series is also sanctioned by the FIA and races a spec chassis/battery combination, with manufacturers allowed to develop their own electric power-trains. The series has gained significant traction in recent years.
  - IndyCar Series originated on June 12, 1909, in Portland, Oregon. Shortly after, Indianapolis Motor Speedway opened in 1909 and held races that ranged from 50 to 200 miles (80 to 322 km). Its premier race is the Indianapolis 500 which began on May 11, 1911. Today, IndyCar operates with over 20 teams and 40 different drivers.
Single-seater open-wheel racing cars

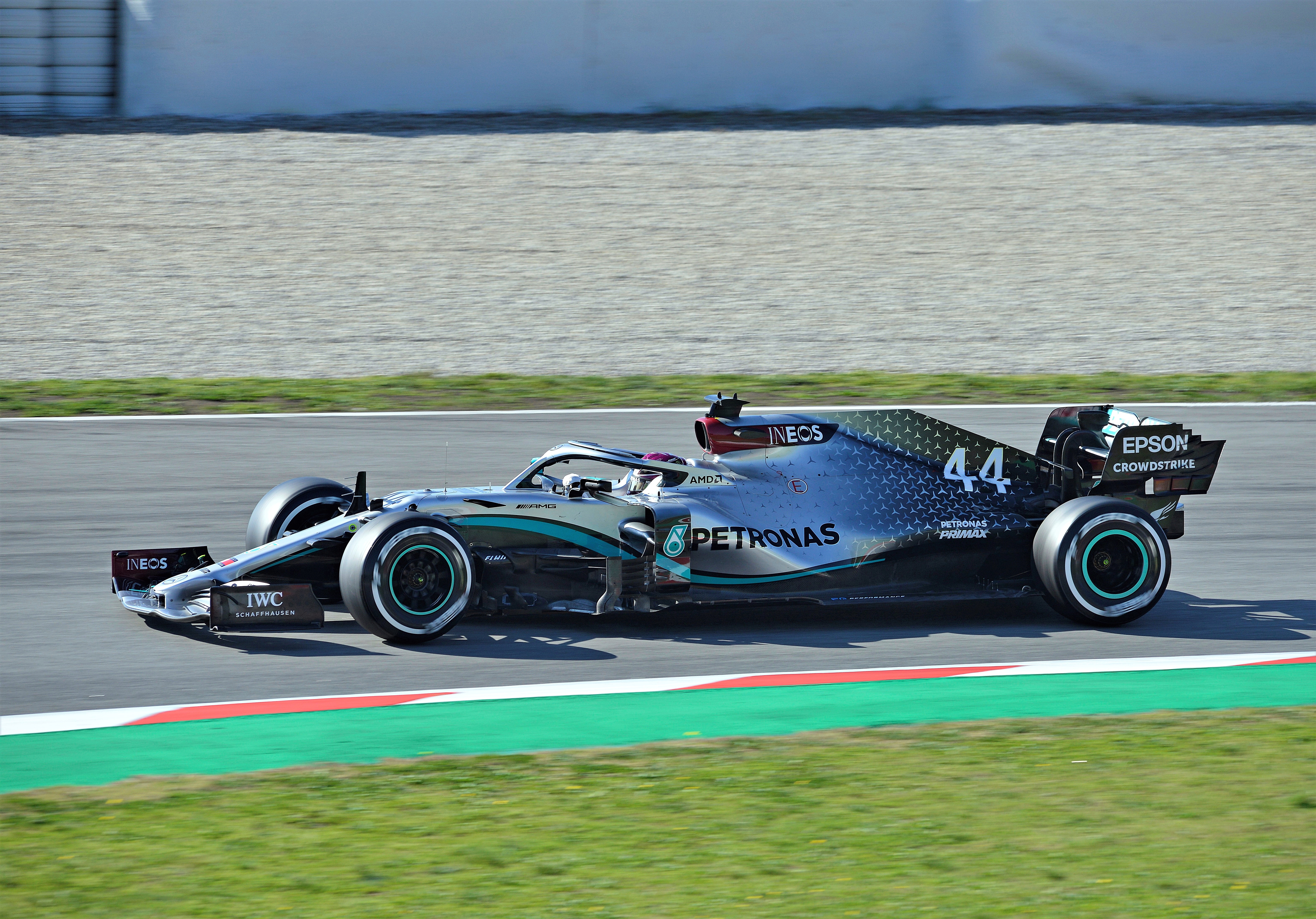
Mercedes W11 Formula One car

A 2023 Formula E car, driven by Daniel Ticktum

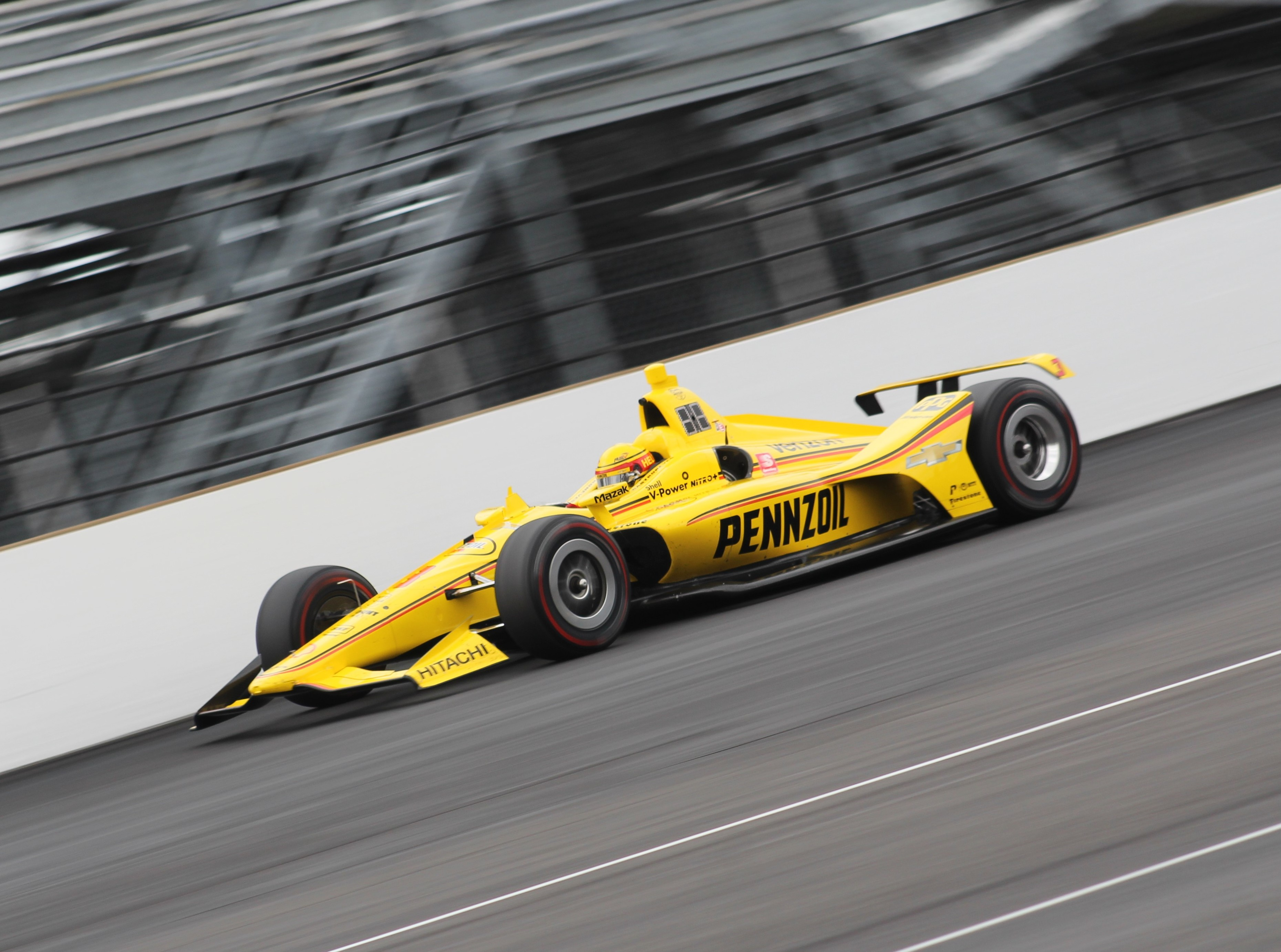
Hélio Castroneves IndyCar at the 2019 Indianapolis 500

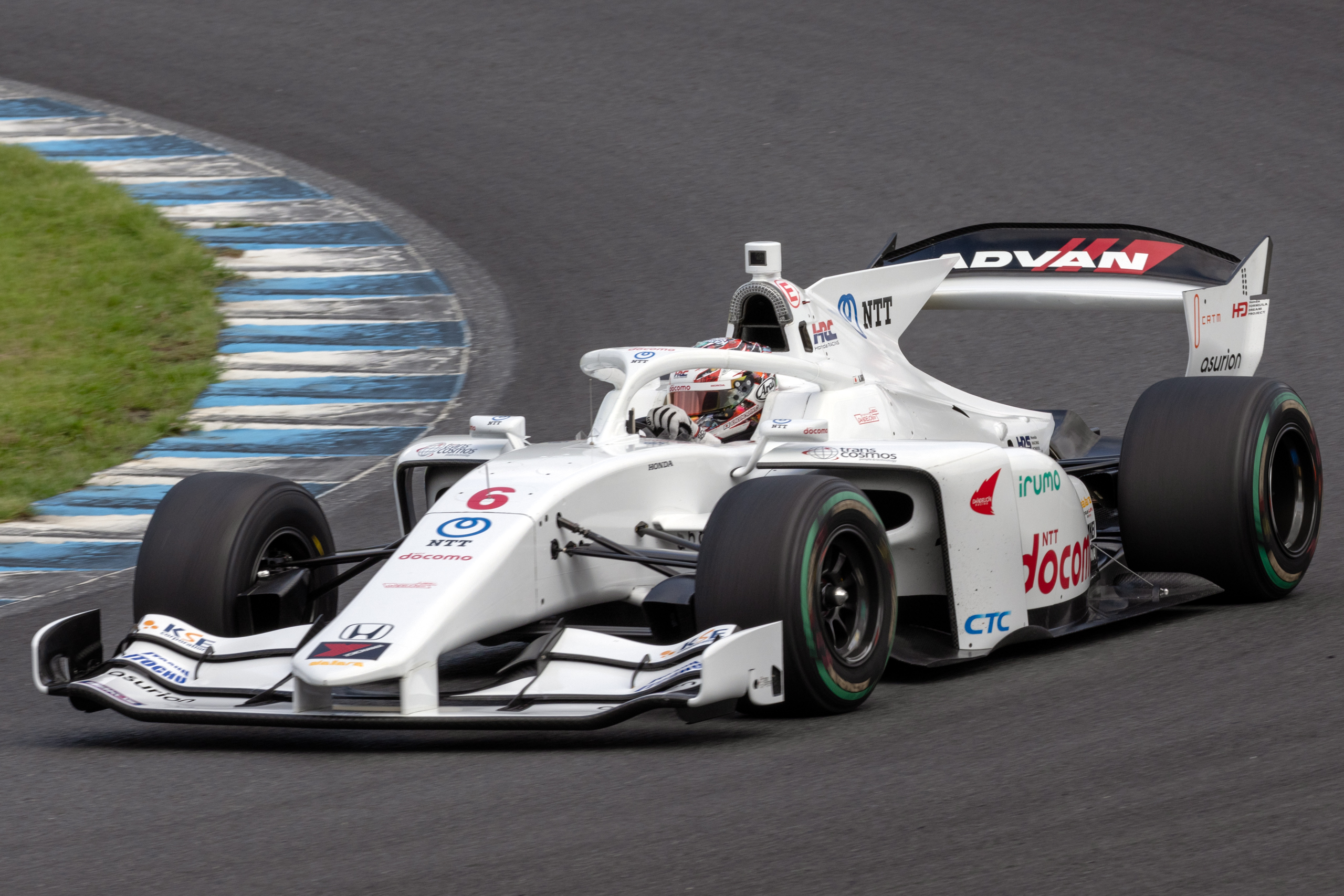
Super Formula car

- Sports car racing involves two categories. One includes production-based grand touring (GT) and sports cars. Although these are separate vehicle categories when built for road use; and historically they were raced as manufactured, these vehicle types have little difference when prepared for modern racing. The second category includes racing prototypes, thorough closed-bodied race cars with wheels enclosed by the bodywork and with the historical connection to a sports car's requirement to have two seats and a minimum width. The flagship race is the 24 Hours of Le Mans which takes place annually in France during the month of June. It is a constituent race of the FIA World Endurance Championship.
- Stock car racing originally used production 'stock' cars, the vehicles are now purpose-built prototype sports cars or single-seater cars. In the most prominent series organised by NASCAR in the US, Canada and Brazil amongst others, the cars maintain a silhouette body of a production road car. Stock car racing series' in the UK and New Zealand also use open-wheel, single-seater race cars with little to no bodywork.
- Touring car racing involves modified production cars intended for road use. In FIA regulations, touring cars must be recognised with having a minimum production quota and have a minimum of four seats, although the cars are still heavily modified and prepared for racing. Some national bodies accept cars with two seats as touring cars.
- Truck racing involves racing of modified large goods vehicle tractor units.
Enclosed-wheel racing cars

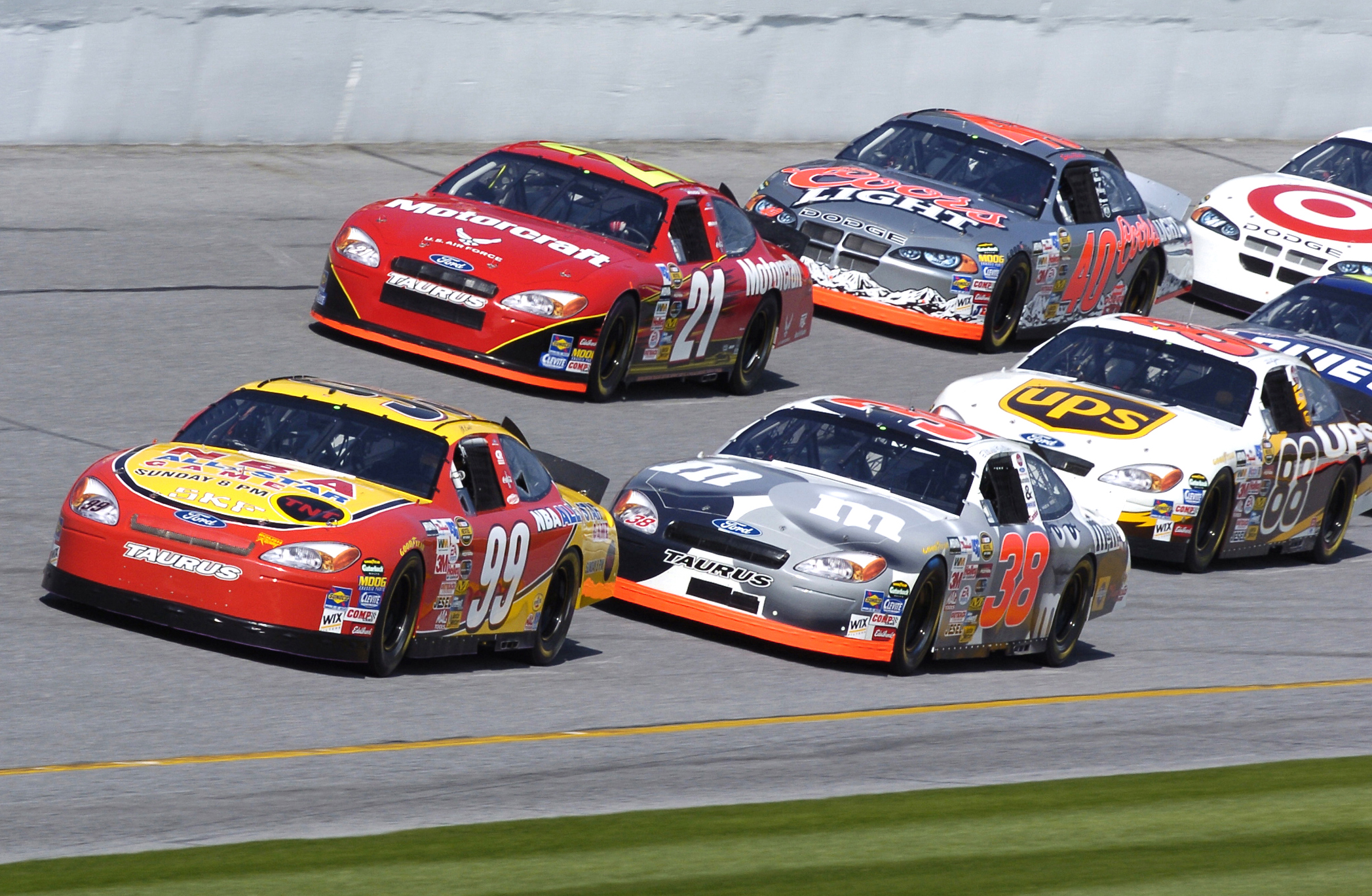
NASCAR vehicles at Daytona International Speedway in 2004

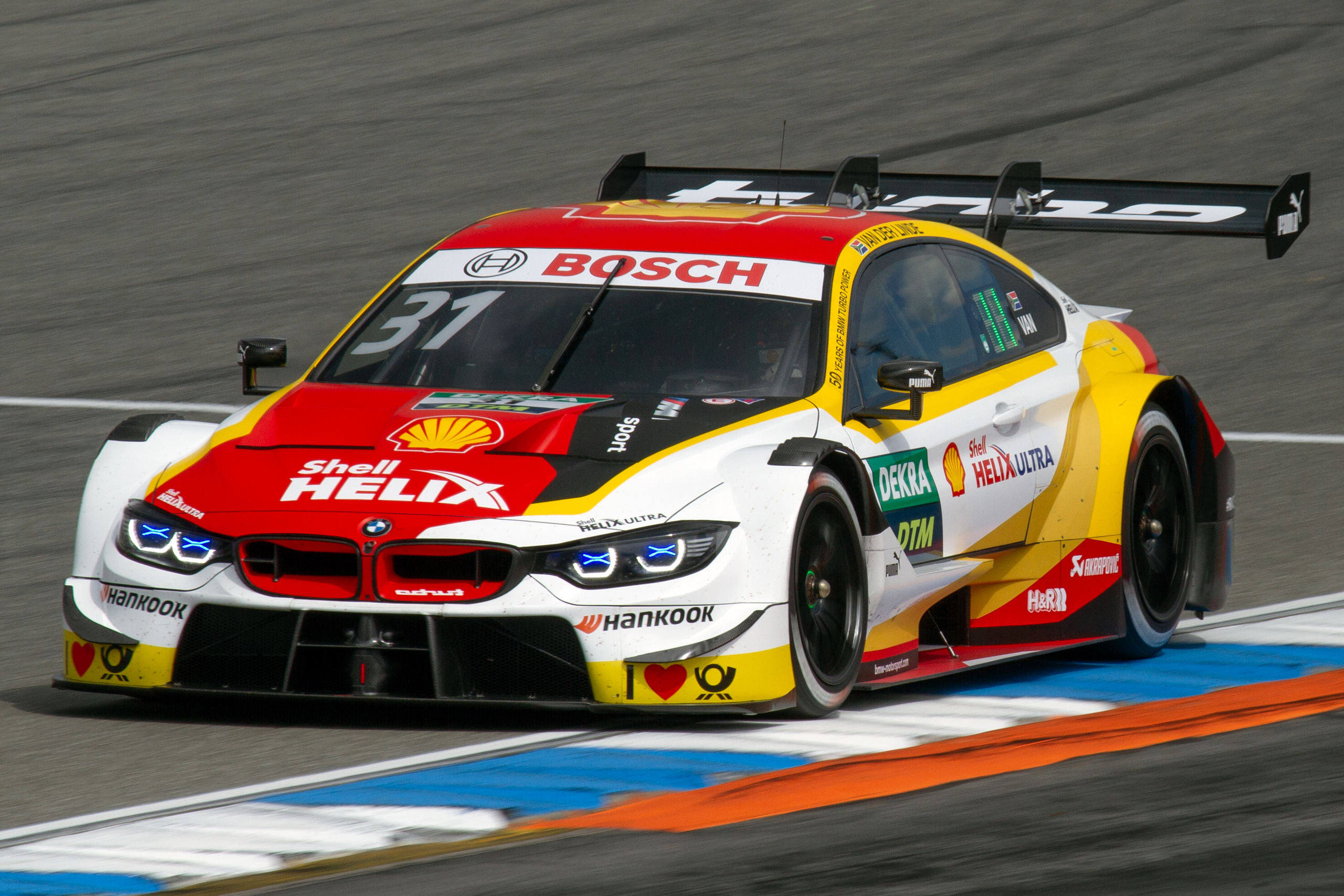
A BMW M4 DTM touring car, racing in the DTM

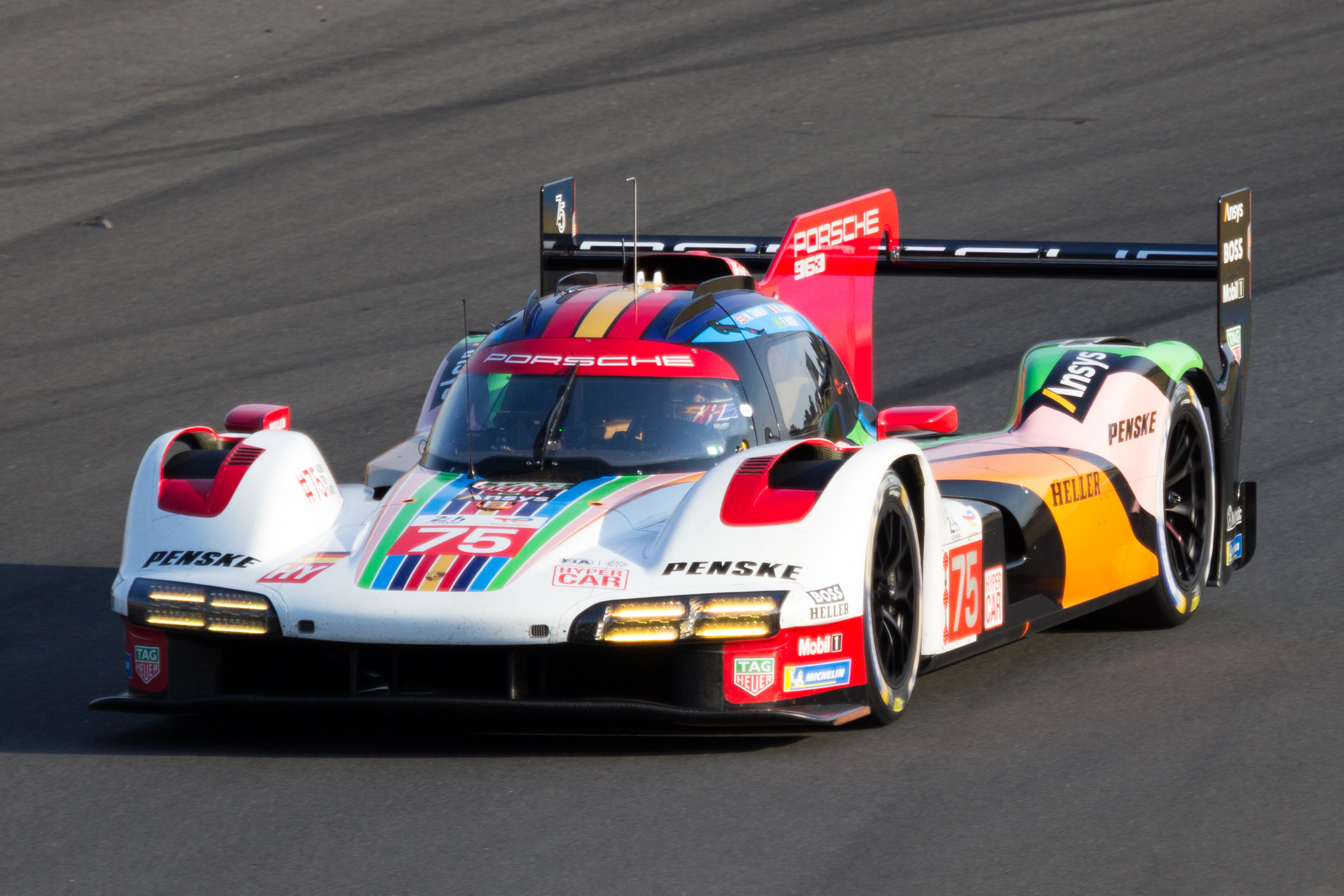
Porsche 963 prototype sports car at Le Mans

Truck racing

==== Off-road racing ====
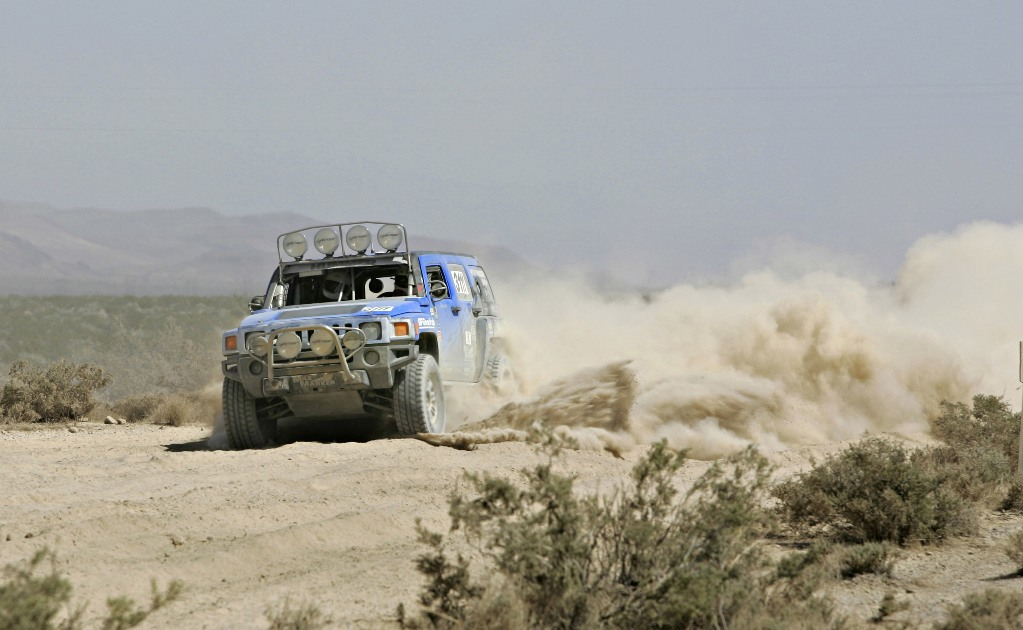
Rob Hall driving SCORE Stock Mini in Baja 1000

Off-road racing can take place on open terrain with no set path, or on circuits that do not have a sealed surface such as asphalt or concrete.

Notable off-road races on open terrain include the Baja 1000 desert race, organised by SCORE International. The FIA authorise Extreme E, an electric off-road series whose organisers have announced a hydrogen fuel series, Extreme H, to begin in 2025.

Examples of off-road racing disciplines and series include:

- Rallycross, short sprint races of touring cars on compact circuits of both asphalt and dirt surfaces. The discipline was born in Great Britain in 1967, when some entrants of the cancelled RAC Rally used their rally cars in a televised race instead.
- Lawn mower racing, involves the racing of ride-on lawnmowers on dirt surfaced circuits or point-to-point cross-country courses. The British Lawn Mower Racing Association organises an annual World Championship which consists of one event.
- Autograss, a British off-road racing series sanctioned by the National Autograss Sport Association. Ten classes of various vehicle categories are accepted, and races for each class are usually four to ten laps long and have up to eight vehicles competing.

==== Drag racing ====
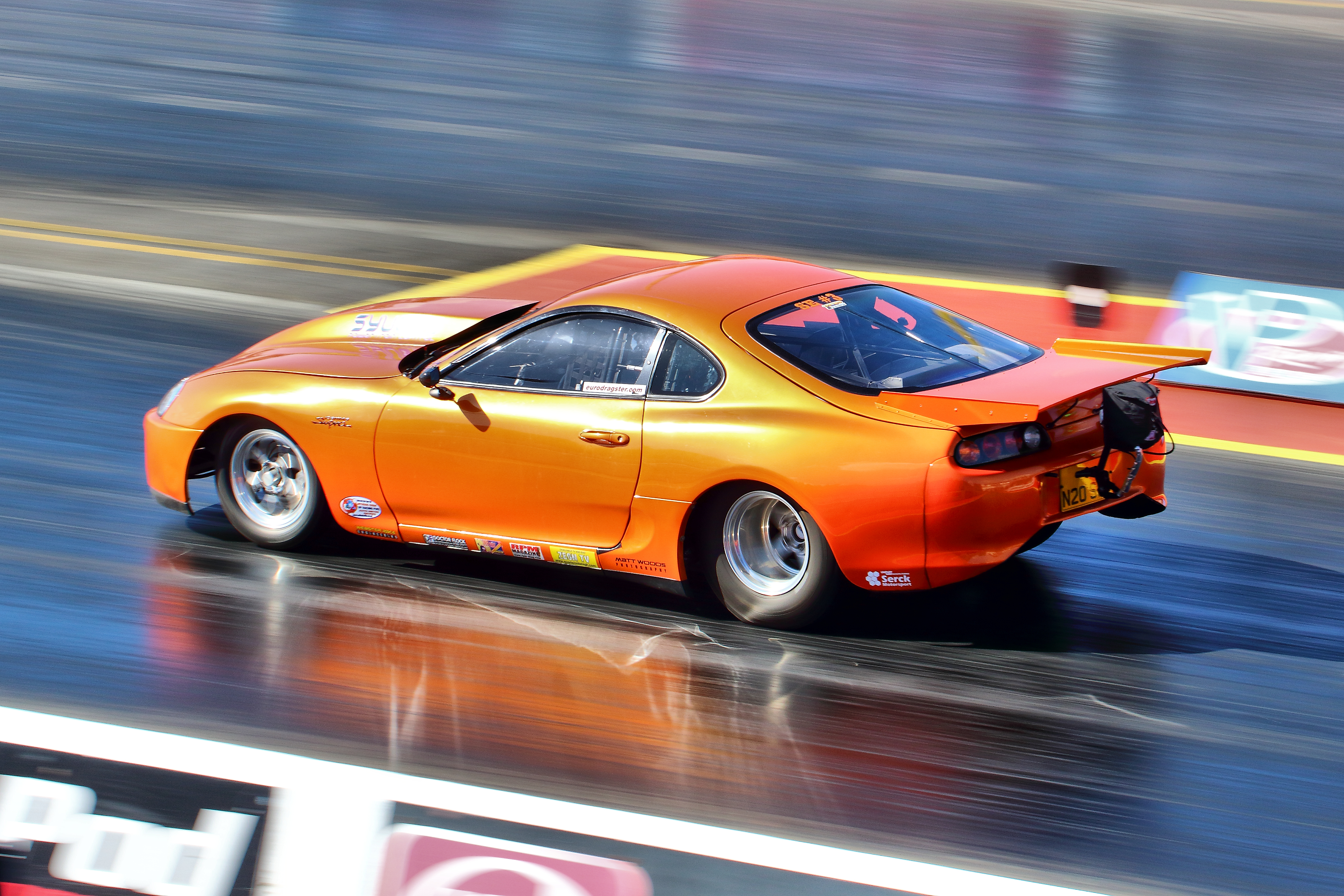
MKIV Toyota Supra drag racing

Drag racing is an acceleration contest from a standing start along a short and straight course. Vehicles of various types can compete, usually between two vehicles. Winners can be the first to finish of competing pairs or by setting the fastest time, and competitions may have heats and/or series of runs.

==== Karting ====
Kart racing is a form of circuit racing using very small and low vehicles not considered as automobiles known as go-karts. It is one of the sports regulated by FIA (under the name of CIK), permitting licensed competition racing for anyone from the age of 8 onward. It is generally accepted as the most economical form of motorsport available on four wheels. As a free-time activity, it can be performed by almost anybody, and as karting circuits can be indoors and not take as much space as other forms of motorsport, it can be accessible to retail consumers without much qualification or training.

=== Hill climbs, time-trials and sprints ===
Non-racing speed competitions have various names but all carry the general rule of participants completing a course individually with the intention of setting the shortest time or highest average speed. This form of motorsport can be recreational or when competitive, rules may vary slightly such as whether to include the total time of several runs, the best time set, or the average pace of multiple courses to classify competitors.

Qualifying sessions for circuit races and special stages in rallying take the general form of time trials and sprints.

==== Hillclimbing ====
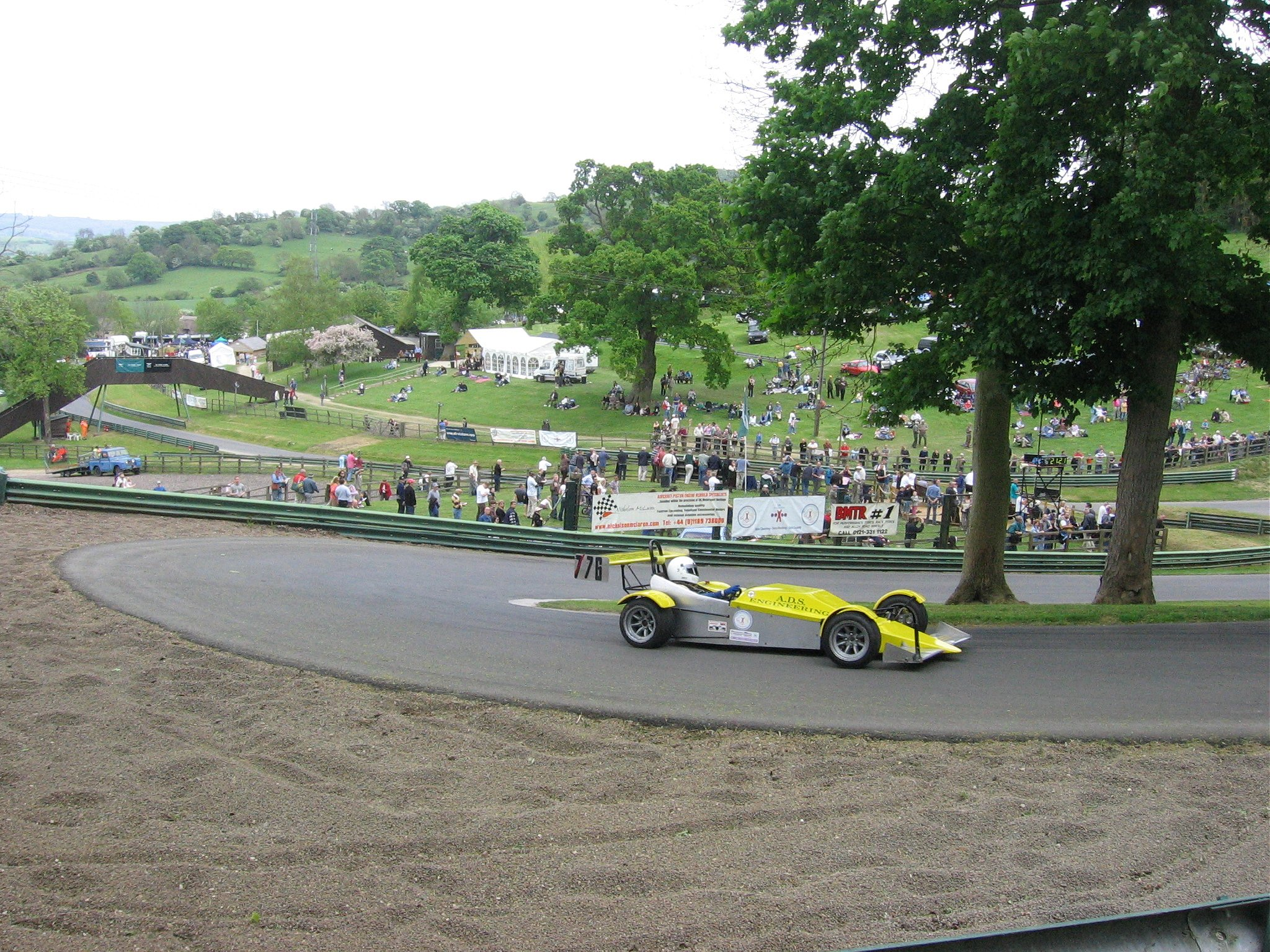
Prescott Hillclimb, United Kingdom

Hillclimbing is the most widely known form of time-trial due to its status as the only time trial or sprint form to have international FIA championships and endorsement. Its origins begin near the start of motorsport, particularly with the trials held that tested the capabilities of early automobiles to tackle uphill gradients. Contestants complete an uphill course individually and against the clock, the winner having the shortest, lowest average or total time. Hillclimbing events often include classes of competition for various categories and ages of vehicle and so may be incorporated into car shows or festivals of motoring such as the Goodwood Festival of Speed. Hill climb courses can be short at less than 1 mile, or several miles long such as the 12.42 mile Pikes Peak course in Colorado, USA.

==== Sprints, time trials and time attack ====
Sprints are governed by national FIA member ASNs in United Kingdom, Ireland and Australia, amongst other places. They are held on courses that do not climb a hill, at private and closed roadways where higher speeds and distances can be reached than at an autotesting course for example.

Time attack are terms used by series that run sprints at racing circuits where competitors try to set the quickest lap time rather than racing head-to-head with others.

Time trials are run by the Sports Car Club of America, amongst others.

==== Rallysprint ====
Rallysprints are mainly sanctioned and held in continental Europe. Ultimately, they are similar to other time trial sprints but originate from the cars and courses used in special stage rallying with the elements of navigation and itinerary removed, and not necessarily requiring a co-driver to call pacenotes.

=== Rallying ===
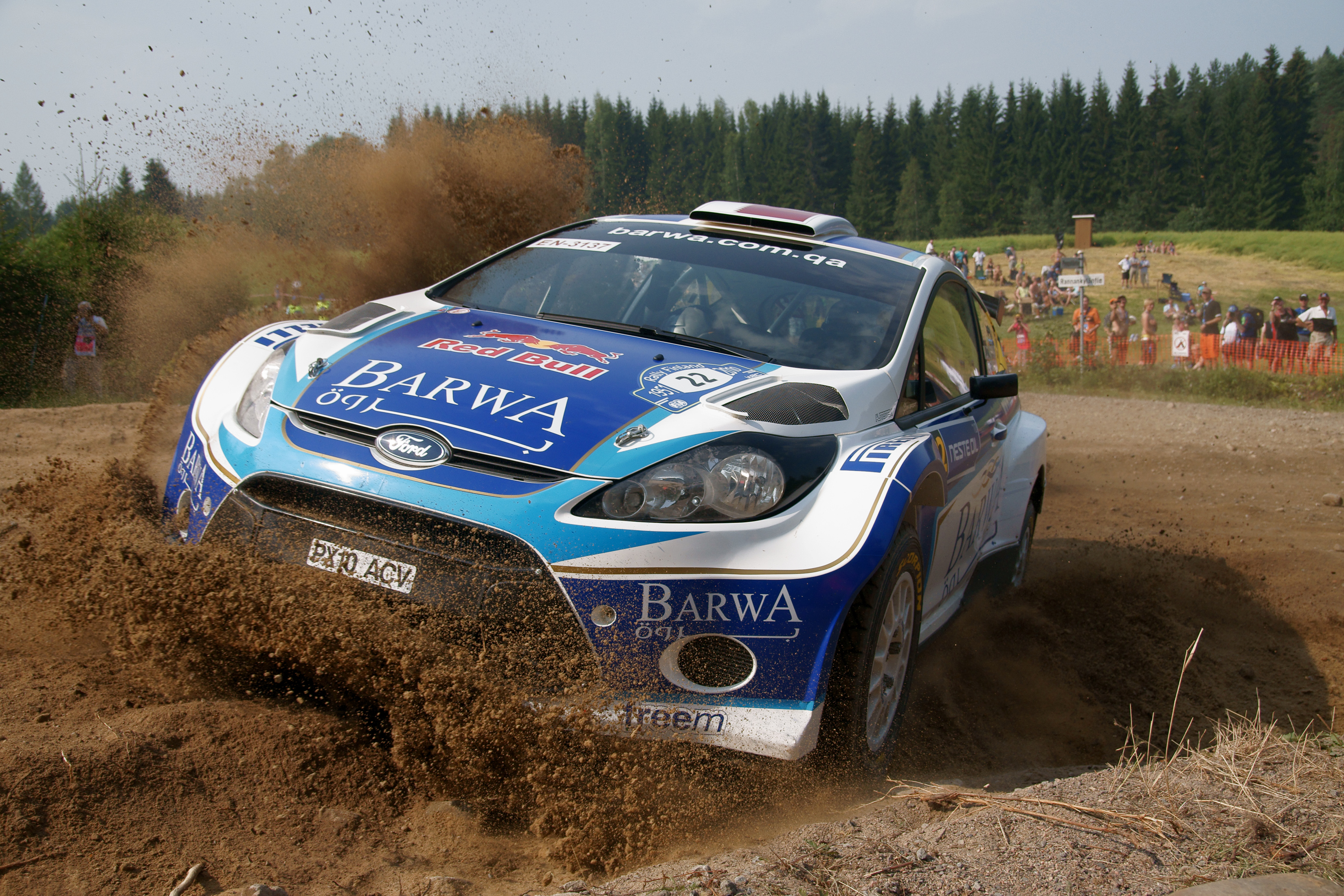
A Ford Fiesta S2000 rally car during 2010 Rally Finland

Rallying involves driving to a set itinerary, following a prescribed route and arriving and departing at control points at set times with penalties applied for diverging from the route or arriving late and early.

Rallies nearly always involve routes on open roads, closed special stages are used on some rallies where competitors drive against the clock. The classification of these rallies are determined by summing the times set with the fastest crews being victorious, as found in the World Rally Championship. This method is often called rally racing or stage rallying informally, whilst rallies that do not include special stages are distinctly regularity rallies.

Rallies that include routes that cover terrain off-road are also known as rally raid or cross-country rallies, the most famous example being the Dakar Rally. In the United States, the National Off-Road Racing Association (NORRA) was founded in 1967 along with the Baja 1000. Since the 1990s, this race has been organised by SCORE International whilst NORRA's events have closer followed the FIA regulations and standards for cross country rallies, although the association has no affiliation to ACCUS, the US's FIA member.

=== Drifting ===
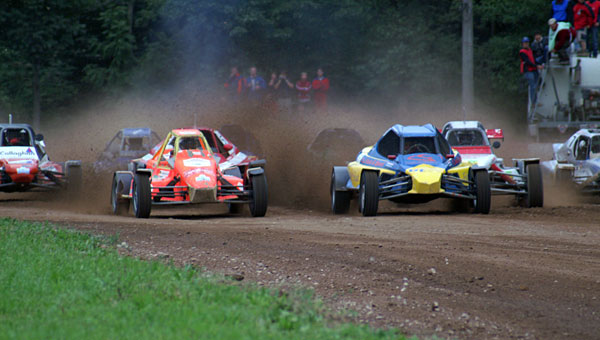
Autocross race in Germany

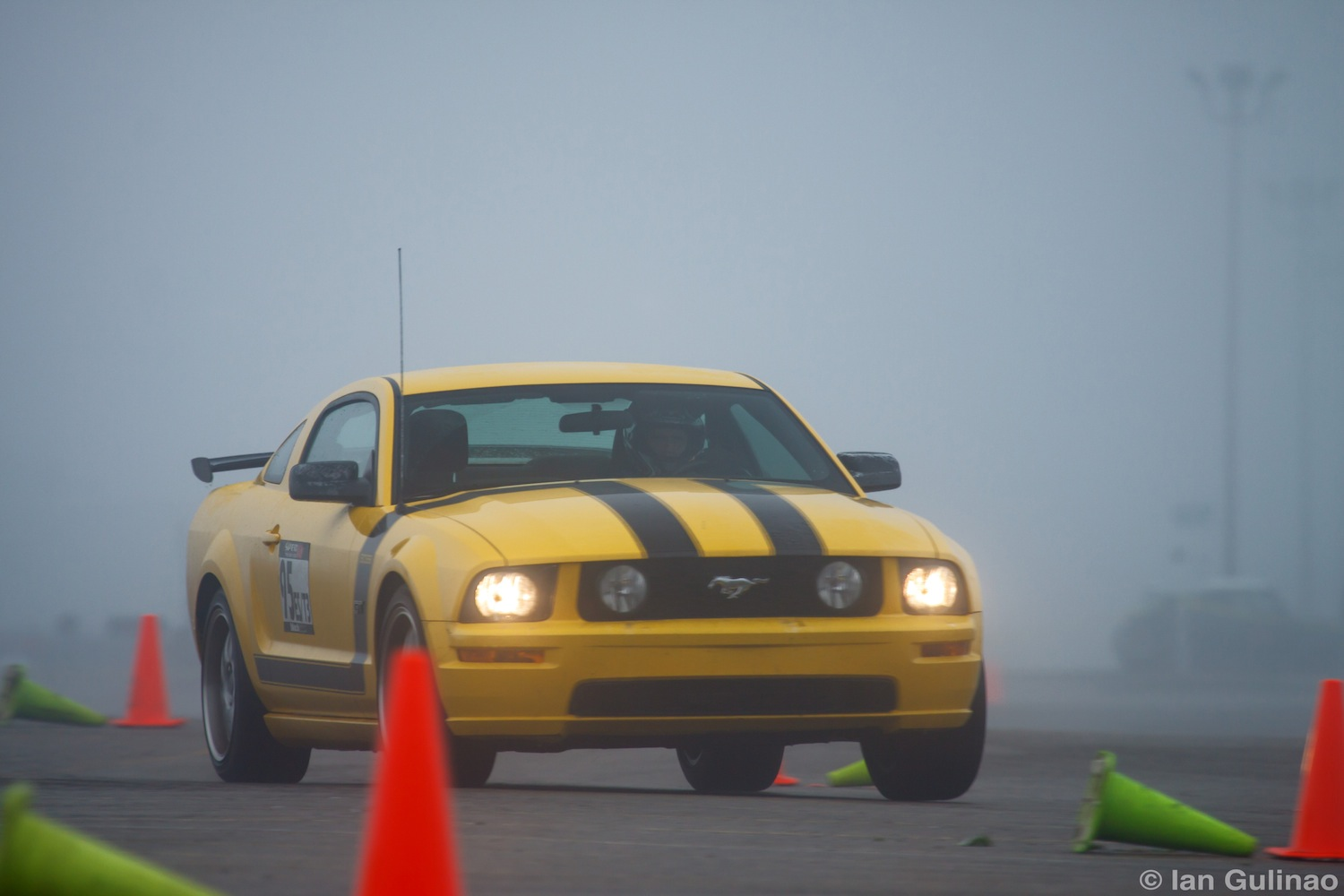
Autocross run on a temporary course in Canada

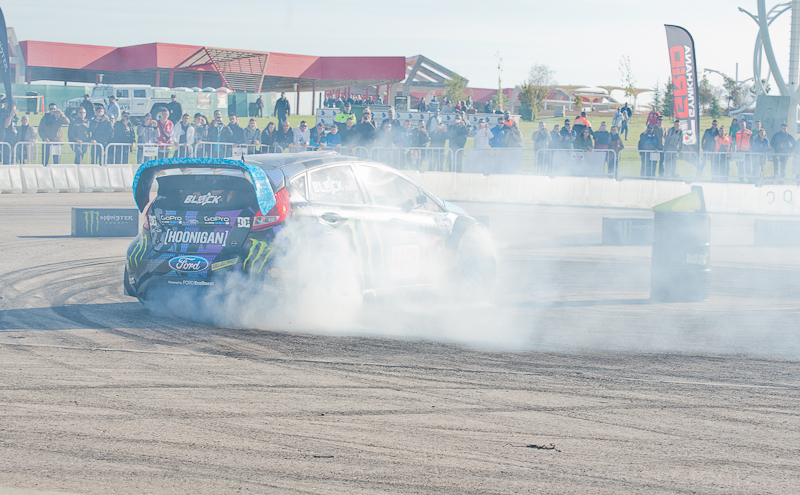
360 degree 'donut' around a barrel at a gymkhana event in Spain

Drifting is a form of motorsport where drivers intentionally lose rolling traction in corners through oversteering but maintain momentum with effective throttle control, clutch use and corrective steering. In competition a panel of judges award marks on artistry and car control through the corner or series of corners. Competitions often feature pairs of cars driving together where a lead car and a chase car go head-to-head, with only one car going through to the next heat or winning the competition.

=== Autocross ===
Autocross has multiple general meanings based on country of use.

- Prescribed by the FIA and in continental European nations is a form of off-road racing on short circuits entirely on unsealed surfaces. The cars are typically enclosed single-seaters called buggies; touring cars or tubular-chassis cross-cars.
- In United Kingdom and Ireland is an off-road time trial over a short temporary course. Multiple competitors may be on the course at one time but are not racing head-to-head.
- In United States and Canada is similar to Autotesting in the United Kingdom and Australia. It is a form of low-speed time-trial on short circuits or courses that are often temporary and reconfigurable allowing for multiple passes of new routes at one compact venue.

=== Autotesting/Gymkhana ===
Also known as Autocross in US and Canada and Autoslalom in Continental Europe, these similar disciplines are held in the United Kingdom, Ireland, Australia and New Zealand. They involve precise car control, usually but not always against the clock on very short and compact temporary courses. Rather than being a high-speed test, car handling manoeuvres can be tested such as precision drifting, donuts, handbrake turns, reversing and so on.

=== Other ===
Other disciplines of automobile sport include:

- Autoball
- Demolition derby
- Land speed record attempts
- Monster truck events
- Rock crawling
- Street racing
- Tractor pulling
- Trials

== Motorcycle sport ==
The international motorcycle sport governing body recognised by the International Olympic Committee is the Fédération Internationale de Motocyclisme (FIM).

Disciplines include:

- Enduro
- Gymkhana
- Motocross
- Motorcycle racing
- Motorcycle rally
- Motorcycle trials
- Speedway

== Powerboating ==
The international powerboating governing body recognised by the International Olympic Committee is the Union Internationale Motonautique (UIM). The organisation's origins date back to 1922.

- Inshore powerboat racing
- Offshore powerboat racing
- Personal watercraft/jet ski racing

== Air sports ==
The international air sports governing body recognised by the International Olympic Committee is the Fédération Aéronautique Internationale (FAI). The FAI also governs non-powered air sport such as gliding and ballooning, however its motorised sports include:

- Air racing
- Drone racing
- Rotorcraft/helicopter competitions

== Other forms of motorsport ==
- Hovercraft racing
- Radio-controlled model racing
- Slot car racing
- Snowmobile racing

== See also ==
- Electric motorsport
- List of motorsport championships
