= Gymkhana Grid =

Gymkhana car race

- Sport: Gymkhana
- First season: 2010
- Folded: 2019
- Owner: Ken Block
- Country: Worldwide

Gymkhana Grid was a gymkhana car race held annually in different venues around the world from 2010 to 2019.

It was co-founded by racecar driver Ken Block, clothing brand DC Shoes and promoter Chris Willard. However, the 2011 edition was cancelled after business conflicts and Willard left the organization.

The racecourse is symmetrical, so drivers make a timed run on each one. The driver with best aggregate times advances to the next round of the bracket. Courses have tight corners, which encourage drivers to apply drifting techniques, and feature obstacles such as barrels, tyres, ship containers and tanks.

The event features several rallycross and drifting champions and also amateur racers, sometimes split in different classes. Likewise, each event had all-wheel drive and rear-wheel drive classes, except at the X Games Los Angeles 2013 where there it has single AWD class.

From 2013 to 2016, there were qualifier events held in different venues in Europe. The final event was held in 2019.

== Winners ==
Edition	Venue	AWD		RWD		Ref
2010	(United States) Irwindale Speedway, Irwindale	(United States) Tanner Foust	Ford Fiesta	(Japan) Daijiro Yoshihara	Nissan S13	
2012	(United Kingdom) Santa Pod Raceway, Podington	(United Kingdom) Dmitrij Sribnyj	Subaru Impreza	(Netherlands) Remmo Niezen	BMW E30	
2013 (X Games)	(United States) Irwindale Speedway, Irwindale	(United States) Tanner Foust	Ford Fiesta	-	-	
2013	(Spain) Ciudad del Rock, Arganda del Rey	(Spain) Nani Roma	Mini	(Australia) Luke Fink	Nissan S13	
2014	(Spain) Ciudad del Rock, Arganda del Rey	(United States) Ken Block	Ford Fiesta	(United Kingdom) Luke Woodham	Nissan S14	
2015	(United Kingdom) Santa Pod Raceway, Podington	(United Kingdom) Dmitrij Sribnyj	Subaru Impreza	(United Kingdom) Luke Woodham	Nissan S14	
2016	Marathon, Greece	(Norway) Petter Solberg	Citroën Xsara	(United Kingdom) Luke Woodham	Nissan S14	
2017	(South Africa) Carnival City, Brakpan	(Sweden) Johan Kristoffersson	Volkswagen Polo	(United Kingdom) Luke Woodham	Nissan S14	
2018	(South Africa) Carnival City, Brakpan	(Sweden) Johan Kristoffersson	Volkswagen Polo	(Japan) Daigo Saito	Chevrolet Corvette	
2019	(Poland) Ptak Warsaw Expo, Warsaw	(Norway) Petter Solberg	Volkswagen Polo	(Lithuania) Mantas Šliogeris	Mazda MX-5	

== See also ==
- Hoonigan Racing Division
