= Motorkhana =

Low-cost form of motorsport, unique to Australia and New Zealand

Motorkhana is a low-cost form of motorsport, unique to Australia and New Zealand but similar to autotesting in the UK and Ireland and gymkhana in the US. It involves manoeuvring a car through tight tests as quickly as possible - one car at a time - on either dirt or bitumen surfaces. This usually requires sliding and spinning the car accurately while maintaining speed through the test course. Some reversing is usually included.

Each test takes from 15 to 60 seconds to complete and is defined by flags. Hitting flags or going the wrong way incur time penalties which are added to the total time. A day’s competition – an event – usually includes 8 to 12 tests. Vehicle speed rarely exceeds 60 km/h (37 mph) but the tightness of the tests ensures the driver is kept very busy.

Most competitors use normal road cars but some use specially built vehicles (motorkhana specials) which are much lighter and have specialised braking systems to facilitate the spin turns. Some motorkhana specials use modified automatic transmissions to facilitate rapid gearchanges between first and reverse gears. They usually use racing slick tyres for bitumen and concrete surfaces.

Awards are made to the driver with the lowest total time in each class. Classes separate production cars from specials and large production cars from small production cars. There are often classes for female drivers, and for junior drivers as young as 12.

Most Australian motorkhanas are run to the National Motorkhana Code rules. Australian championship and state championship events use tests from the Motorkhana Test booklet which specifies test dimensions, required direction of travel and flag colours. Most championship motorkhanas are run on bitumen or concrete while club events are usually on dirt, grass or mud.
