= List of race tracks in Norway =

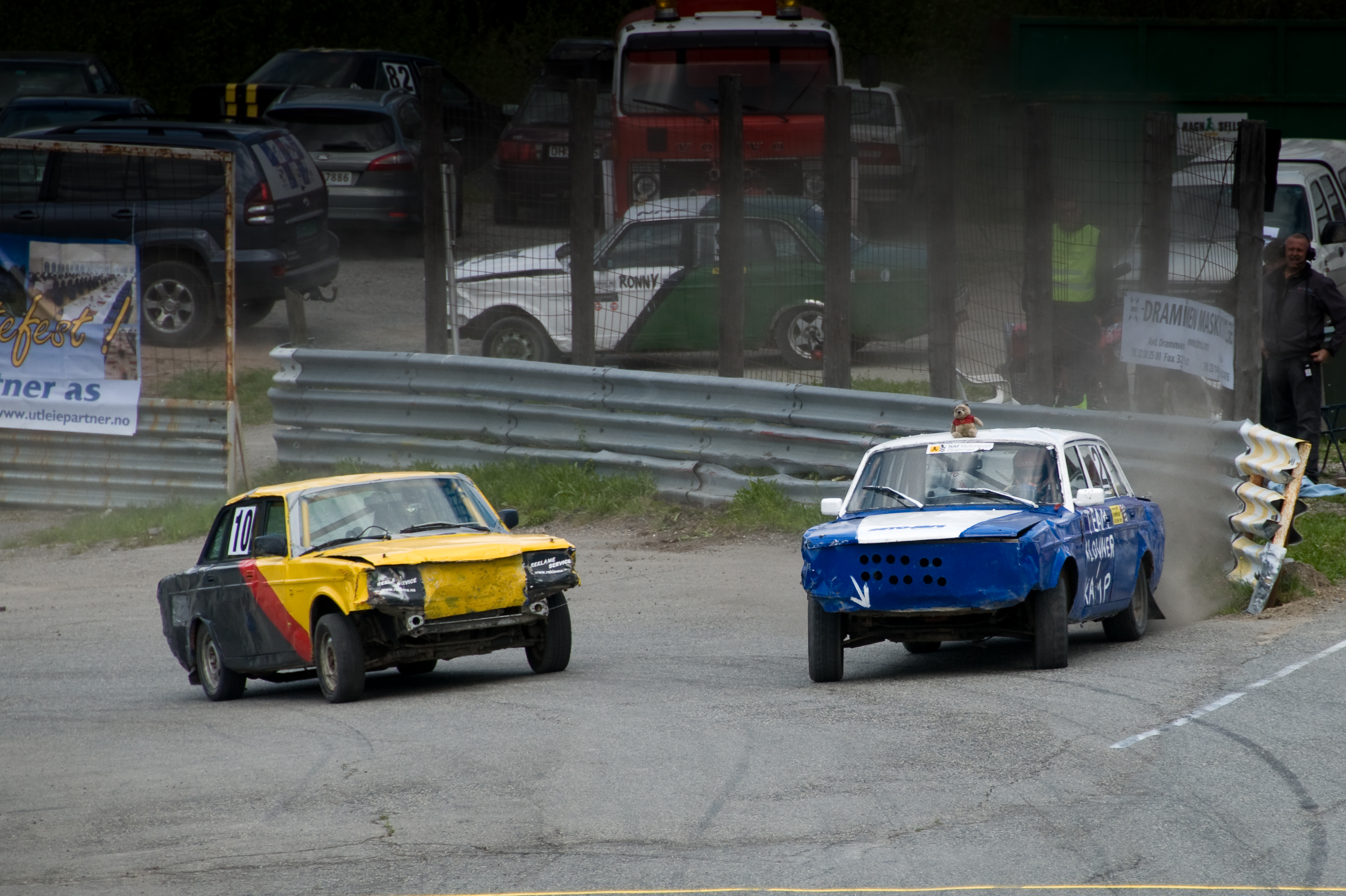
Folkrace at Lyngåsbanen in Norway, 2009.

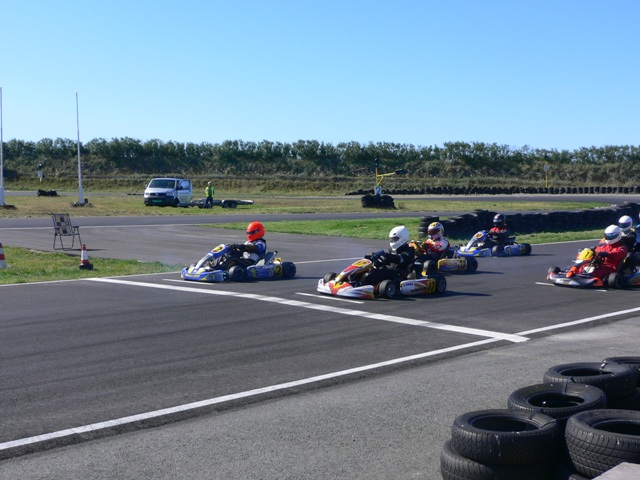
Kart-race at Reve kartring.

This article is a list of race tracks in Norway for auto racing and other types of motorsport, for example within road racing, kart racing, folkrace, rallycross, crosskart, hillclimbing, drag racing, off-road, motocross, supercross, supermoto and enduro.

As of 2020 there are four race tracks in Norway with a FIA grade 3 approval, and which therefore can host category 2 races:

- Arctic Circle Raceway in Nordland
- Motorcenter Norway in Rogaland
- Rudskogen in Østfold
- Vålerbanen in Innlandet

Most car racing tracks are operated by clubs associated to Norges Bilsportforbund, either via Norsk Motor Klubb or Kongelig Norsk Automobilklub. Many other forms of racing are operated by clubs associated with Norges Motorsportforbund.

== List of tracks ==
| Name | Use | County | Municipality | Type | Map coordinates |
|---|---|---|---|---|---|
| Arctic Circle Raceway | 1995–current | Nordland | Rana | Road racing, motocross, karting | 66.4235°N 14.4448°E |
| Eikås motorsportsenter | 1999–current | Vestland | Bergen | Road racing | 60.4812°N 5.3717°E |
| Grenland motorsportsenter | 2010–current | Telemark | Skien | Folkrace, rallycross, drifting, ATV, motocross, off-road, trials, enduro | 59.3112°N 9.5491°E |
| Hitra motorsportssenter | 2008–current | Trøndelag | Hitra | Folkrace, rallycross, crosskart | 63.6981°N 8.7575°E |
| Motorcenter Norway | 2021–current | Rogaland | Sokndal | Road racing, drag racing, karting, off-road, motocross, supercross, supermotard, enduro | 58.3448°N 6.3946°E |
| Lyngåsbanen | 1972–2013 | Buskerud | Lier | Rallycross | 59.8196°N 10.2409°E |
| Rudskogen | 1990–current | Østfold | Rakkestad | Road racing, karting, enduro | 59.3678°N 11.2619°E |
| Rugslandsbanen | ?–current | Agder | Birkenes | Folkrace, rallycross | 58.2985°N 8.1734°E |
| Vålerbanen | 1993–current | Innlandet | Våler | Road racing, off-road, karting | 60.7037°N 11.8101°E |
| Lånkebanen | 1988–current | Trøndelag | Stjørdal | Rallycross, crosskart, shortcar, folkrace | 63.4049°N 10.9206°E |
| Tynset motorsenter | | Innlandet | Tynset | Rallycross, crosskart, shortcar, folkrace | 62.2422°N 10.7428°E |
| Finnskogbanen | | Innlandet | Åsnes | Rallycross, crosskart, shortcar, bilcross | 60.6963°N 12.3062°E |
| Vikedal motorbane | 1982–current | Rogaland | Vindafjord | Bilcross, Rallycross, Motocross, Crosskart, Shortcar | 59.5368°N 5.9679°E |
| Reve kartring | 1987–current | Rogaland | Klepp | Karting, motorcycle road racing, car road racing | 58.7571°N 5.5126°E |
| Varna kartring | | Østfold | Våler | Karting | 59.4769°N 10.9401°E |
| Elvedalen gokartbane | | Innlandet | Gjøvik | Karting | 60.8684°N 10.4544°E |
| Ålesund kartring | | Møre og Romsdal | Ålesund | Karting | 62.4836°N 6.3843°E |
| Momarken bilbane | | Østfold | Indre Østfold | Bilcross, bakkeløp, crosskart, rally | 59.5691°N 11.3339°E |
| Bjorli motorsportsenter | | Innlandet | Lesja | Karting, rallycross, crosskart, folkrace | 62.2327°N 8.2489°E |
| Rennebu gokartbane | | Trøndelag | Rennebu | Karting | 62.8334°N 9.9621°E |
| Lister gokartbane | | Agder | Farsund | Karting | 58.1120°N 6.6125°E |
| Egersund motorsportsenter | | Rogaland | Eigersund | Karting | 58.5015°N 5.9299°E |
| Vamoen motorsportsenter | | Agder | Evje og Hornnes | Karting | 58.5292°N 7.7815°E |
| Haugaland motorsenter | | Rogaland | Haugesund | Karting | 59.4461°N 5.2516°E |
| Kinsarvik gokartbane | | Vestland | Ullensvang | Karting | 60.3647°N 6.7455°E |
| Håsken gokartbane (Andebu NAF gokartsenter, Håskenheim) | | Vestfold | Sandefjord | Karting, supermoto | 59.3306°N 10.1373°E |
| Kråkenesmarka motorsportsenter | | Vestland | Sunnfjord | Karting, motocross, folkracerallycross, drifting | 61.4763°N 5.7341°E |
| Skjåk aktivitetspark | | Innlandet | Skjåk | Karting, motocross | 61.9493°N 7.8842°E |
| Trøgstad motorsenter | | Østfold | Indre Østfold | Karting | 59.6456°N 11.3166°E |
| Eggemoen gokartsenter | | Buskerud | Ringerike | Karting, shortcar, autocross | 60.2039°N 10.3116°E |
| Kongsberg motorsenter | | Buskerud | Kongsberg | Karting, motocross, bilcross, supermotard | 59.667°N 9.693°E |
| Gudbrandsdal gokartbane | | Innlandet | Ringebu | Karting | 61.4352°N 10.1773°E |
| Malmedalen motorsenter | | Møre og Romsdal | Hustadvika | Karting | 62.7973°N 7.2913°E |
| Halsa motorsportsenter | | Trøndelag | Heim | Karting | 63.1231°N 8.3769°E |
| Steinkjer Racing Park | | Trøndelag | Steinkjer | Karting | 64.0161°N 11.7077°E |
| Harstad motorsportsenter | | Troms | Harstad | Folkrace, rallycross, crosskart, off-road, minibike, motocross | 68.7968°N 16.4259°E |
| Evertmoen motorstadion | 1988–current | Troms | Dyrøy | Karting, folkrace | 69.0679°N 17.7188°E |
| Kvenvikmoen motorpark | | Finnmark | Alta | Karting, folkrace, rallycross, motorcycle road racing, motocross, ATV, supermotto, freestyle, snocross, snow dragracing | 69.906°N 23.053°E |
| Kaupangerskogen øvingsbane | 1988–current | Vestland | Sogndal | Karting, motocross, shortcar, autocross, street legal, drifting, ATV | 61.2021°N 7.2073°E |
| Vinstra motorsportarena (Rustmoen motorbane) | | Innlandet | Nord-Fron | Motocross, crosskart, off-road | 61.5664°N 9.7605°E |
| Haltdalen motorsportsenter | 2015–current | Trøndelag | Holtålen | Off-road, motocross, snocross, folkrace, rallycross, radio-controlled cars | 62.9142°N 11.1391°E |
| Stranda motorcrossbane | | Møre og Romsdal | Stranda | Motocross, ATV | 62.2714°N 6.8680°E |
| Dråvika motorsportsenter | 2007–current | Nordland | Fauske | Folkrace, rallycross, motocross, hillclimbing, autocross, drifting, shortcar, off-road | 67.1766°N 15.8215°E |
| Bringsli gokartbane | | Nordland | Fauske | Karting | 67.3553°N 15.2534°E |
| Trollheimen motorstadion | 1989–current | Trøndelag | Rindal | Folkrace, minibike | |
| Åsegarden motorstadion | | Troms | Harstad | Folkrace | 68.797°N 16.427°E |
| Ålesund motorstadion | | Møre og Romsdal | Ålesund | Drifting, rallycross, folkrace, minibike, hillclimbing, car trials, ATV, autocross, shortcar, crosskart | |
| Raabakken motorstadion | 1999–current | Trøndelag | Overhalla | Folkrace | 64.4585°N 11.7051°E |
| Offroadparken Kristiansand | | Agder | Kristiansand | Off-road | 58.1745°N 8.1151°E |
| Ramfjordmoen motorstadion | | Troms | Tromsø | Folkrace, rallycross, crosskart | 69.5794°N 19.2244°E |
| Kvinlaug motorstadion | | Agder | Kvinesdal | Folkrace, rallycross, crosskart | 58.4797°N 6.9308°E |
| Verdal motorsenter | | Trøndelag | Verdal | Drifting | 63.7515°N 11.7496°E |
| Venkvern motorbane | | Innlandet | Ringsaker | Folkrace | 60.8497°N 11.1059°E |
| Hekni motorsportsenter | | Agder | Valle | Drag bike, motocross | 59.0302°N 7.5554°E |
| Gjøngerud motorbane | | Østfold | Marker | Training track for folkracing | 59.4086°N 11.6630°E |
| Sundvold motorbane | | Innlandet | Nord-Aurdal | Folkrace | 60.9107°N 9.3957°E |
| Sæteråsen motorpark | | Innlandet | Trysil | Folkrace | 61.2312°N 12.2674°E |
| Gurskøy gokartbane | | Møre og Romsdal | Herøy | Karting | 62.2485°N 5.7692°E |
| Ulvstuhaugan bilcrossbane | | Trøndelag | Midtre Gauldal | Folkrace | 62.9447°N 10.1481°E |
| Stor-Elvdal motorbane | | Innlandet | Stor-Elvdal | Folkrace | 61.6835°N 10.9001°E |
| Røssvoll motorstadion | | Nordland | Rana | Folkrace, rallycross, drifting, ice racing | 66.3662°N 14.3026°E |
| Arena Wallenberg | 2009–current | Trøndelag | Orkland | Folkrace | 63.1225°N 9.6859°E |
| Smådøl motorsenter (Uvdal motorsenter) | | Buskerud | Nore og Uvdal | Folkrace | 60.2959°N 8.8314°E |
| Roppemoen motorbane | | Buskerud | Flå | Folkrace | 60.3988°N 9.5519°E |
| Sigdal motorsenter | | Buskerud | Sigdal | Karting, folkrace, motocross | 60.1174°N 9.5404°E |
| Nord-norsk trafikksenter | | Troms | Senja | Autocross | 69.2556°N 18.1597°E |
| Bollandsmoen motorbane | | Trøndelag | Melhus | Folkrace, rallycross | 63.2119°N 10.3836°E |
| Lofoten motorsportsenter | | Nordland | Vestvågøy | Folkrace, crosskart | 68.2660°N 13.7613°E |
| Kvinlog motorbane | | Agder | Kvinesdal | Folk race | 58.4796°N 6.9306°E |
| Sørlandsparken Speedway | 2011 | Agder | Kristiansand | Speedway | |
| Konsmo motorbane | | Agder | Lyngdal | Folk race | 58.3200°N 7.3640°E |
| Evenes motorstadion | | Nordland | Evenes | Folk race | 68.4896°N 16.7300°E |
| Eriksplassen motorsportanlegg | | Buskerud | Ringerike | Folk race | 60.3037°N 10.1536°E |
| Svenningdal motorstadion | | Nordland | Grane | Folk race | 65.4344°N 13.4046°E |
| Fuglehaugen motorsenter | | Buskerud | Gol | Folkrace, rallycross, karting | 60.7983°N 8.7728°E |
| Vinjarmoen motorbane | | Innlandet | Nordre Land | Folk racecrosskart | 60.8298°N 10.0479°E |
| Drevsjø motorstadion | | Innlandet | Engerdal | Folk race, karting | 61.8992°N 11.9977°E |
| Starmoen motorbane | | Innlandet | Elverum | Folk race, karting, motocross | 60.8633°N 11.6847°E |
| Drammen travbane | | Buskerud | Drammen | Folk race | 59.7561°N 10.1159°E |
| Sørlandets travpark | | Agder | Kristiansand | Folk race | 58.1813°N 8.1520°E |
| Ralle motorbane | | Telemark | Midt-Telemark | Folkrace, motocross | 59.4438°N 9.1236°E |
| Bardu motorsportsenter | | Troms | Bardu | Folk race, karting, crosskart | 68.8541°N 18.3922°E |
| Eksismoa motorbane | | Akershus | Aurskog-Høland | Folk race | 59.8885°N 11.6097°E |
| Brokelandsheia | | Agder | Gjerstad | Off-road | |
| Brekka motorbane | | Østfold | Aremark | Folk race | 59.3127°N 11.6686°E |
| Krabyskogen motorsenter | | Innlandet | Østre Toten | Folk race | 60.6502°N 10.8781°E |
| Setten isbane | | Akershus | Aurskog-Høland | Ice racing | 59.8364°N 11.7134°E |
| Vurrusjøen isbane | | Innlandet | Engerdal | Ice racing | 61.8736°N 12.1020°E |
| Flatsjå isbane | | Telemark | Seljord | Ice racing | 59.5246°N 8.6380°E |
| Markavatnet isbane | | Buskerud | Rollag | Ice racing | 60.1174°N 9.1339°E |
| Ytterpollen isbane | | Nordland | Vestvågøy | Ice racing | 68.2707°N 13.7782°E |
| Kikut isbane, Geilo | | Buskerud | Hol | Ice racing | |
| Målselv fjellandsby | | Troms | Målselv | Hillclimbing | 69.077°N 18.713°E |
| Helganes motorsportsenter | | Rogaland | Karmøy | Folkrace, motorcycle trials, car trials, motocross, enduro, minibike | 59.3439°N 5.2384°E |
| Gardermoen Raceway | | Akershus | Ullensaker | Drag racing, drifting, minibike | 60.1765°N 11.1153°E |
| Gardermoen motorpark | | Akershus | Ullensaker | Folkrace | 60.1880°N 11.1358°E |
| Frøya motorsportsenter | | Trøndelag | Frøya | Drifting | 63.6986°N 8.7583°E |

== See also ==
- Norwegian Grand Prix
