= Rallycross (disambiguation) =

Rallycross is a term for motorsports where automobiles are raced on closed permanent mixed-surface circuits or temporary unpathed surface tracks. It may refer to:

- Rallycross, in Europe, a sport where several cars start at a time and travel several laps around a permanent mixed-surface circuit (usually tarmac and gravel) together. Although the cars are different, it bears some resemblance to sprint car racing in the United States
- SCCA RallyCross, in the United States, a timed event that involves solo driving on grass or dirt in a manner that is similar to how American Autocross events are driven on asphalt or concrete

See also:
