= Shortcar =

Type of car racing

Shortcar is a type of car racing developed in Norway. To keep cost under control, and make the competition depend on the driver’s competence and less on the equipment, the cars are standardised, all built from exactly the same frame, supplied in kit form. The wheels, suspension, steering, fuel tank and brakes are standard, supplied by a single source.

The first prototype was made in year 2000. The car is built for competing on tarmac tracks, rallycross tracks, hill climbs and ice racing.

== History ==
The founder of Shortcar is Tommy Kongsten. Together with a group of enthusiasts in Norway he developed the car and the type of racing. Shortcar has been approved by FIA through the Norwegian Car Sport Association (Norges Bilsportforbund) and is an integrated racing car class that have official leagues in Norway and Sweden. Shortcar is a separate class of racing cars and do not compete with other racing car categories or classes.

== Technical guidelines ==
The power in the engine used is in the range of 170 to 200 horsepower. If the power (measured in horsepower) is P, the weight of the vehicle when finishing a race must be minimum ( 2.3 * P + 80 ) kg. The total vehicle weight of can be more than 480 kg, excluding the driver. The Shortcar accelerates from 0 to 100 km/h in approximately 2.6 seconds and can achieve a top speed of 250 km/h. The participants can decide which 4-stroke engine they want to use. It must be a standard production 4-stroke motorcycle engine with up to four cylinders. The most common types are Yamaha, Kawasaki, Honda and Suzuki engines with between 1000 and 1200 cm2 capacity. The length of the car is maximum 255 cm, and it is maximum 152 cm wide.

== Characteristic ==
Characteristic of the shortcar division is the limits of improvements. Every participant has to follow the specifications given and it is not allowed to increase engine power or reduce weight to improve the cars performers.

== Series and tournament ==
In the 2011 season there are 50 cars competing in the Norwegian championship. The championship is open for any driver with a racing license.

== See also ==
- Midget car racing
