= RallyCar Rallycross Championship =

The RallyCar Rallycross Championship is a rallycross championship held in the United States. Founded in 2010, it is the first series in America for European-style rallycross competition. The series is run by RallyCar, which also runs the Rally America stage rallying series.

RallyCar Rallycross is different from SCCA RallyCross, which is similar to Autocross but contested on an unpaved surface. Cars run one at-a-time, unlike rallycross, where competitors race wheel-to-wheel. The first event attracted names such as Travis Pastrana, Dave Mirra and Tanner Foust.

== History ==
Rallycross made its US debut at X Games 16 in 2010, under the name SuperRally, organised by RallyCar. The championship is aimed to make rallycross grow at a national level in the United States.

Three events were held at the end of 2010 at New Jersey Motorsports Park. The first full season was run in 2011, with three races being also valid for the Global Rallycross Championship in the West Coast and three in the Midwest as a supporting event to the Traxxas TORC Series.
