= Off-road go-kart =

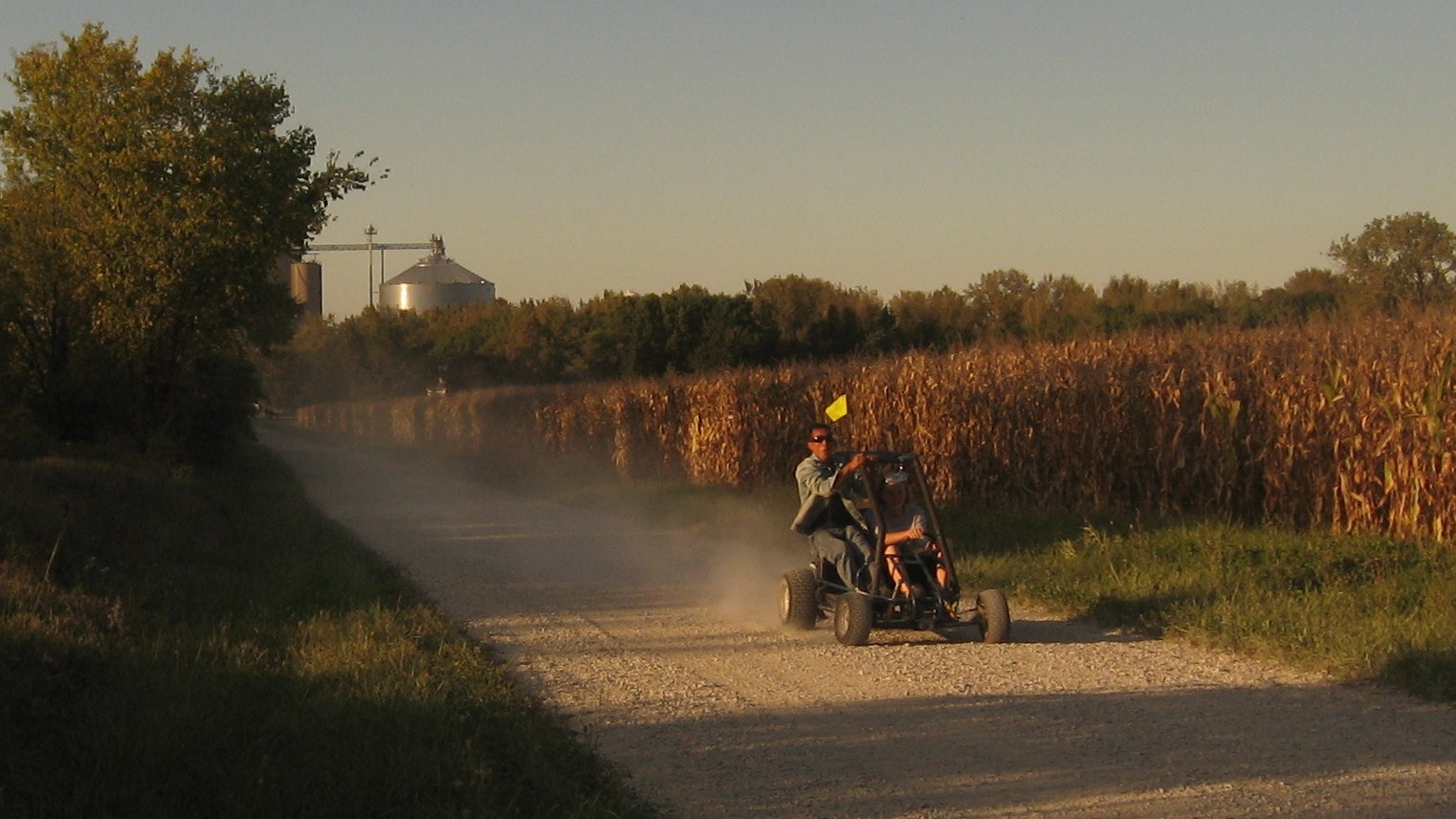
Riding a go-kart

Off-road go-karting uses a four-wheeled powered vehicle designed for off-road usage. This is opposed to the longer established activities of racing go-karts used for racing on a paved road circuit. Off-road go-karting is now a well-established and popular activity with a burgeoning range of vehicles, options, and adherents.

Just as the automobile is undergoing evolutionary changes, noticeably in the field of "off-road" use, the smaller recreational vehicles called "go-karts" have spawned a new generation of vehicles for off-road use.

The origins of using a go-kart-sized vehicle for off-road use undoubtedly had many stages of development and claimants whose homemade vehicles were "the first" off-road go-karts. However, as it concerns manufactured products, it seems the first was from Honda, who released in 1977 a vehicle they called the Odyssey, essentially an "off-road" go-kart with a 250 cm^{3} two-stroke engine, single-seat, and a continuously variable automatic transmission (CVT). The main differences to the traditional racing go-kart were a bigger size of tires (giving greater ground clearance and off-road traction) and a roll cage.

This proved to be a very popular vehicle and in 1985 Honda made major upgrades to the Odyssey and released the FL350. Changes were an improved roll cage, 350 cm^{3} engine with an electric starter, and a full front and back suspension system. Then, in late 1989 Honda released the FL 400. In addition to the increased engine size (a liquid-cooled 400 cm^{3} unit), it had its suspension improved to handle the extra load. However, this had evolved into an expensive vehicle and sales decreased, so Honda ceased manufacture in 1990.

Although today these aging Honda units are still to be found and have an enthusiastic following, their main achievement was to create a pool of enthusiasts alerted to the possibilities of off-road small vehicle recreation.

The question of when an off-road "go-kart" becomes an off-road "buggy", or when a dune buggy becomes an off-road buggy, or even if there is any difference will no doubt elicit many opinions and responses. Even manufacturers seem confused and the terms "buggy" and "go-kart" are often used interchangeably for the same vehicle. However, in terms of the evolution of go-karts and buggies, it seems correct to point out that go-karts are mainly constructed without a differential and are not intended to be registered for road use. They are purpose-built from scratch, not using second-hand auto parts. All of these features are shared by many of the off-road go-karts on the market today. However, in the U.S.A. the term "buggy" is often applied to the same type of vehicle referred to as a "go-kart" in most other countries.

"Buggies" were originally made by converting existing vehicles (usually VWs, like the Volkswagen Beetle) and were usually intended for both on-road and off-road use (mainly on sand or beaches) and the majority still are. However, just as racing go-karts have evolved off-road cousins, so the dune buggy now has many versions of off-road buggy and trail use is increasing rapidly. This type of buggy has undergone many transformations in body style and appearance and many are purpose built from scratch using all new parts instead of converted second-hand auto parts and have the same style of frame and body structure as off-road go-karts.

A simple and workable distinction would seem to be that "go-karts" are not intended for certification or approval for "on road" use at any time, but a "buggy" can be.

== See also ==
- Crosskart
- Go-kart
- Dune buggy
