= Crosskart =

Type of kart racing

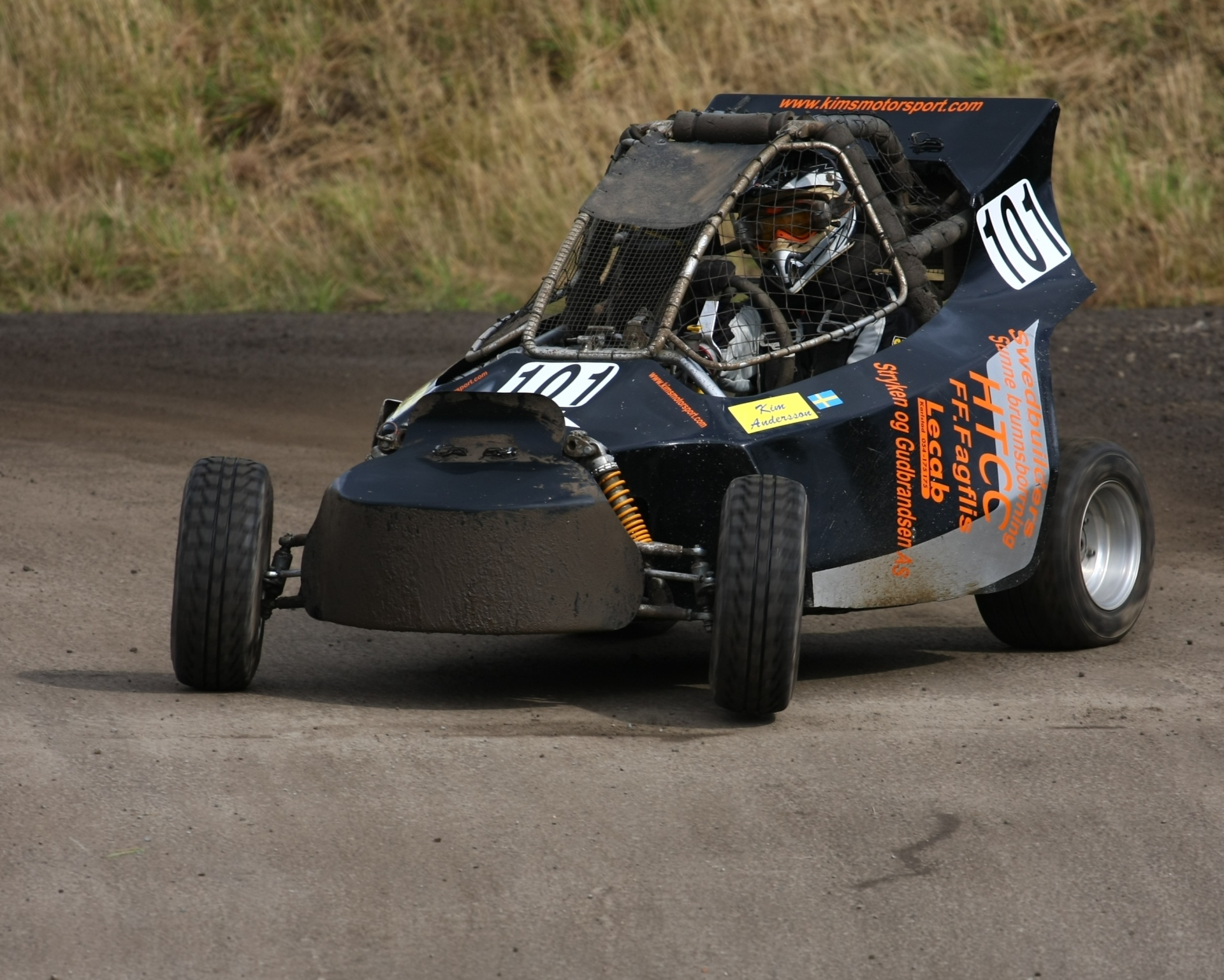
Crosskart

Crosskart (also cross car, sprint car, kart cross or off-road kart) is a type of kart racing that takes place on autocross, rallycross, dirt oval or ice racing tracks instead of on paved tracks.

Competitions take place in classes that are based on cylinder volume (85 cc, 125 cc, 250 cc, or 650 cc). The 85 cc and 125 cc classes are junior classes, open to those 9, respectively 12 years of age and older, but one can begin training at age 8. The 250 cc, and 650 cc classes are open to people above 15 respectively 16 years of age. The engines are from 1-cylindered production motorcycles and mx motorcycles. 85 up to 250 cc are two-stroke engines, while the 650 class uses 4-stroke. From 2022 4-stroke 250cc engine is allowed in 125 class (swe class 2) and 450cc 4-stroke in 250cc class (swe class 3).

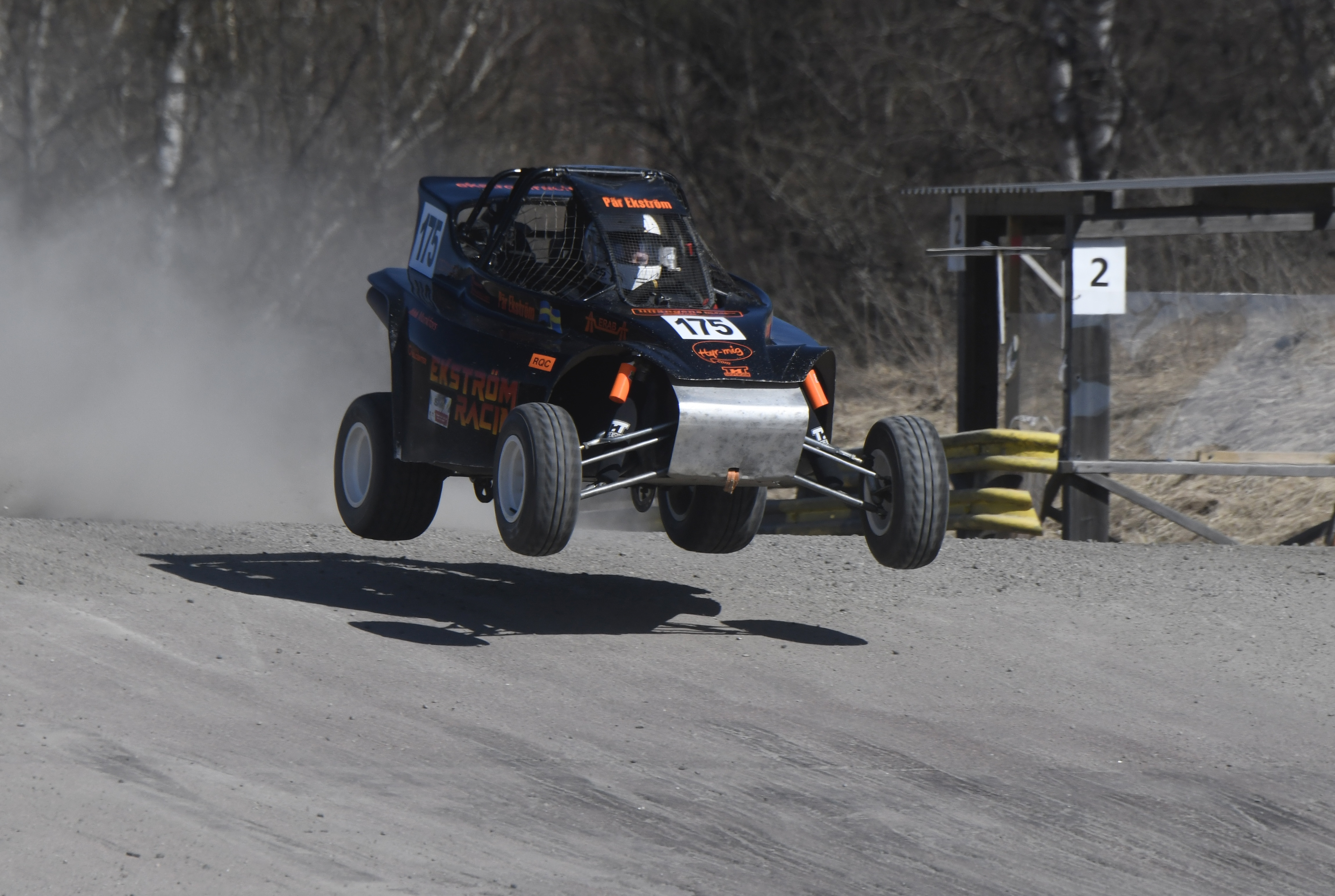

In the mini class, the boys and girls from age of 6 years can compete. In Sweden, it is just a practice and learning class, while there is competition in Denmark and Norway.

Erland Andersson of Sweden (trials-rider and custom-bike builder under the label "EAS") invented the crosskart in the early 1980s. The idea was to create something that is safe, cheap, and easy to maintain, but still fun to ride. The crosskart is basically a simplified version of a sprint car, midget car and mini sprint.

Crosskarting is probably most popular in the Nordic countries, although in southern Europe a similar motorsport with more powerful engines, kartcross, exists.

== See also ==
- Buggy
- Off road go-kart
