= Autograss =

Form of motor racing

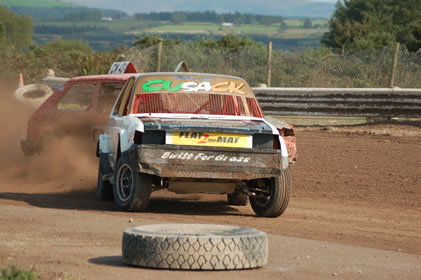
Class 3 Autograss car

Autograss is a form of motor racing, with races organised at various venues across the UK and Ireland. The roots of the discipline can be traced back to the 1960s.

Typically, Autograss races are conducted on oval tracks spanning approximately 400 meters and featuring grass or mud surfaces. These races are primarily organised and promoted by non-profit clubs which are affiliated with the National Autograss Sport Association, the governing body of the sport. The National Championships, held annually, comprise separate class events for men, women and juniors. The championships usually take place from August to September.

The sport encompasses ten different car classes, ranging from production saloons to single-seat 'specials'.

== Classes of cars ==
The rules and regulations for all classes are outlined by the National Autograss Sport Association.

=== Class 1 ===
The cars used in Autograss racing are small hatchbacks, which undergo certain modifications. As per Autograss regulations, these cars have their trim, dashboard and seats removed. The engine is typically kept standard with limited modifications allowed, such as a reboring of up to +60. The engine capacity is restricted to 998cc, except for Mini's which can be modified up to 1058cc.

In separate races, junior drivers aged 10–16 are permitted to drive class 1 cars. Initially limited to Mini's standard 1000cc, the eligibility of this class has expanded to include cars like the Peugeot 106, Nissan Micra, Toyota Yaris, and Citroën c1 since 2006. To accommodate the rising costs and scarcity of classic Minis, other experimental cars are being added to the list. The purpose of class 1 racing is to maintain an entry-level class with affordable construction costs.

=== Class 2 ===
Class 2 in Autograss racing encompasses front-wheel-drive vehicles equipped with an engine that has two valves per cylinder and does not exceed 1300cc. These vehicles can have their engines placed either at the front or the back. The commonly observed models in this class are Vauxhall Nova, Nissan Micra, and Ford Fiesta. To ensure fair competition among the diverse range of vehicles used, a restrictor is fitted in the inlet manifold to balance their performance.

=== Class 3 ===
Class 3 allows for cars with unlimited tuning modifications. The cars in this class are required to have front-mounted engines and rear-wheel-drive. It allows for the conversion of front-wheel-drive vehicles to rear-wheel-drive and permits the use of 16-valve engines with a maximum capacity of 2065cc, while engines with two valves per cylinder have no displacement limitations. As a result, this class features lightweight and high-speed cars with considerable power. Among the vehicles commonly found in this class are Toyota Starlet, MKII Ford Escort, and Ford Anglia.

=== Class 4 ===
Class 4 is a modified category in Autograss racing, permitting engine capacities up to 1130cc. While various engine modifications are permitted, turbocharging and supercharging are not allowed. The rules require that the original engine and its position should remain unchanged, but extensive modifications are made to enhance competitiveness. Cars commonly found in this class include Mini, Hillman Imp, Citroen Saxo, Nissan Micras, and Peugeot 106.

=== Class 5 ===
This category serves as an entry point for individuals interested in driving modified saloon cars. It permits engine capacities ranging from 1131 to 1420cc, without requiring the use of the original engine or its original position. Many cars in this class use rear engines to enhance traction and grip.

=== Class 6 ===
Class 6 is designated for vehicles with unrestricted engine capacity and modifications, specifically for front engine and front wheel drive configurations.

=== Class 7 ===
Class 7 is exclusively designated for rear-wheel-drive vehicles. The engine capacities in this class are unrestricted, but they must exceed 1421cc, unless a motorcycle engine is used, in which case a 1000cc engine is permissible. A considerable number of class 7 cars utilise motorcycle engines and in such cases, two engines may be employed to propel the vehicle. The engines used in these cars include Cosworth turbo-engines, large-block American V8 engines, and various highly tuned V6 engines.

=== Class 8 ===
This class imposes the strictest limit on engine capacity, allowing a maximum of 1420cc for car engines and 1350cc for bike engines. Engine tuning is permitted, but turbocharging or supercharging are not allowed. While the majority of cars in this class are designed with rear engines, this configuration is not explicitly mandated by the regulations; however, it is considered the most effective approach for maximising weight distribution over the wheels.

=== Class 9 ===
This class features modern 2.0 L engines, resulting in lighter cars than those used in class 10. The allowed capacity ranges from 1421cc to 2070cc, and extensive modifications are permitted, with the standard exclusions of turbocharging and supercharging. All cars in this class are equipped with mid-engines, and the majority of them utilise a transverse gearbox layout combined with rear-wheel drive.

=== Class 10 ===
Class 10 is a purpose-built class that sets a minimum engine capacity of 2071cc without an upper limit, allowing extensive modifications to the engine (with the exception of forced induction for motorcycle engines). Twin bike engines within the capacity range of 1550cc to 4000cc, as well as V8 engines, are popular choices in this class.

=== Junior Specials ===
This class comprises single-seater vehicles equipped with nearly standard 1.2 L Vauxhall Corsa engines. Similar to the junior class one saloons, class one single-seaters are designated for drivers aged 10 to 16 years.

=== Other classes ===
Some specific clubs feature additional classes, such as the F600, which were introduced as a more affordable and less powerful alternative to provide easier entry into the special classes. These vehicles are equipped with single 600cc engines positioned at the rear, transmitting power to the rear wheels. While predominantly utilised by smaller clubs, F600s can be found in various competitions.

Another class is the stock hatchbacks, where nearly standard saloons with a maximum capacity of 1600cc are used.

However, these classes are not officially recognised as stand-alone categories by the governing body (NASA). When participating in races, they are required to compete in Class 8 or 9 for F600s and Class 6 for stock hatchbacks.

== Safety ==
A number of features and regulations are in place to ensure the safety of competitors. All drivers are required to wear a motorsport helmet and fireproof race suit, gloves and racing shoes. All cars must be fitted with a roll cage or a reinforced chassis, with a satefy harness, fire suppression system and window nets installed.

== See also ==
- Autocross
- Folkrace
