= Motorcenter Norway =

Motor racing track in Norway

- Location: Sokndal Municipality, Norway
- Coordinates: 58°20′45″N 6°23′47″E
- FIA Grade: 3
- Broke ground: 2016
- Opened: 2 July 2021; 4 years ago
- Construction cost: NOK 130 million
- Architect: APEX Circuit Design
- Former names: KNA Raceway Sokndal

Full Circuit (2021–present)
- Length: 2.324 km (1.444 mi)
- Turns: 14
- Race lap record: 1:07.910 ( (Norway) Wiggo Dalmo, Audi R8, 2021, Norwegian GT1)

Motorcenter Norway, formerly known as KNA Raceway Sokndal, is a motorsport center and race track in the mountains at Kroheia in Sokndal Municipality, Norway, south in Rogaland county near the border of Agder county.

The facilities consist of a 2.324 km (1.444 mi) road race track for cars and motorcycles constructed according to FIA Grade 3 and FIM Grade B, an off-road racing area of 381 decare (381 000 m^{2}), an indoor motocross track, as well as a dragstrip on part of the road race track. A kart racing track and a dedicated dragstrip has also been planned.

It has been discussed as a potential national center for Norwegian motorsport in the future pending further development.

== History ==
The facility is built near an open-pit mine. It was opened in July 2021, and development had then taken 18 years and cost NOK 130 million. Later the same year it was announced that the construction had exceeded the budget by NOK 29 million.

The official opening ceremony was held 29 September 2021, with Norwegian prime minister Erna Solberg present doing the ribbon-cutting in front of volunteers and athletes. Before that, the Norwegian tarmac racing championship for cars had "started early", on the weekend of 2-4 July 2021.

In 2022, the track held the third and last round of the Norwegian drifting championship. The track also held the Norwegian championship and cup in motorcycle road racing the same year.

== Road race track ==
The road race track is 2.324 km (1.444 mi) long with 14 turns, is driven in a counter-clockwise direction, and has a corkscrew-turn (turn 3 and 4) which has been dubbed "the Laguna Seca of the Nordics". The track has been constructed according to requirements for all types of races in touring, GT and open-wheel racing up to and including Formula 3. The track can also be used for Formula 2 and Formula 1 testing, but not races. For motorcycle, the track is approved for all classes within road racing.

== Service building ==
A 400 m^{2} (4,300 sq ft) service building has been planned, consisting of a cafeteria, 20 pit garages and a grandstand with an overview of the road race track.

== Dragstrip ==
A dedicated dragstrip has been planned. In the meantime, a temporary dragstrip for street-legal vehicles has been established at the straight of the road race track.

== Kart track ==
A karting track has been planned. The area has been set aside, and initial construction work on the ground has been done. The track has been designed to be technically demanding, and will also be used for minibike and supermoto.

== Motocross track ==
The motocross track is Norways only indoor track for moto cross, and is open half of the year during the winter season. In the summer season, the hall is used for concerts, trade fairs, exhibitions, et cetera. In connection with the hall is a dedicated cafeteria, changing rooms and toilets.

== Off-road track ==
The off-road track consists of 381 decare (381 000 m^{2}) of rough terrain which can be navigated by car, off-road vehicles (ATV, UTV) or motorcycle. The trail changes regularly, and can have lengths of up to 5 kilometers. The off-road area also has a barbecue hut and several lookout points.

== See also ==
- List of race tracks in Norway
