= Folkrace =

Informal Nordic Rally Racing

Folkrace or folk racing (Finnish: jokamiesluokka; Swedish: folkrace; Latvian: folkreiss; Danish: folkeræs; Norwegian: bilcross) is a popular, inexpensive, and entry-level form of Finnish rallycross that originally comes from Finland, where it is also called jokkis or Jokamiehenluokka (everyman's class). It is now popular across the Nordic world.

== About ==
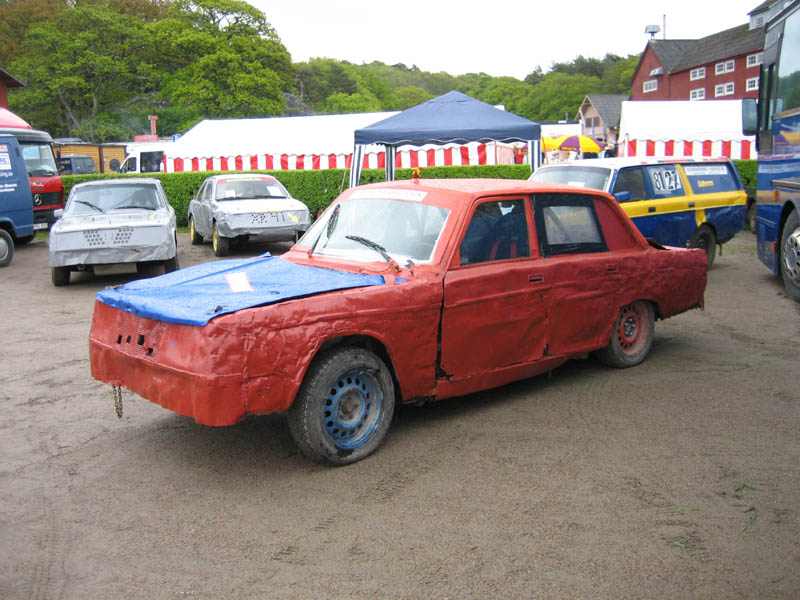
Four typical folk racing cars. Volvo 244 in foreground.

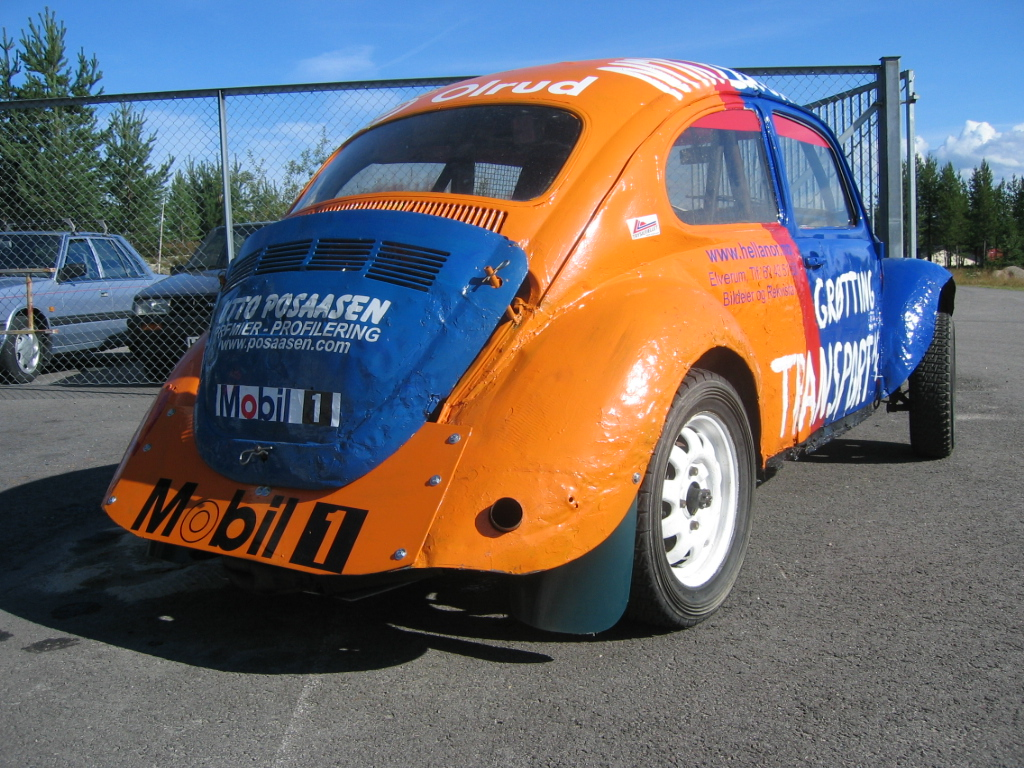
A VW Beetle used as a folk racing car.

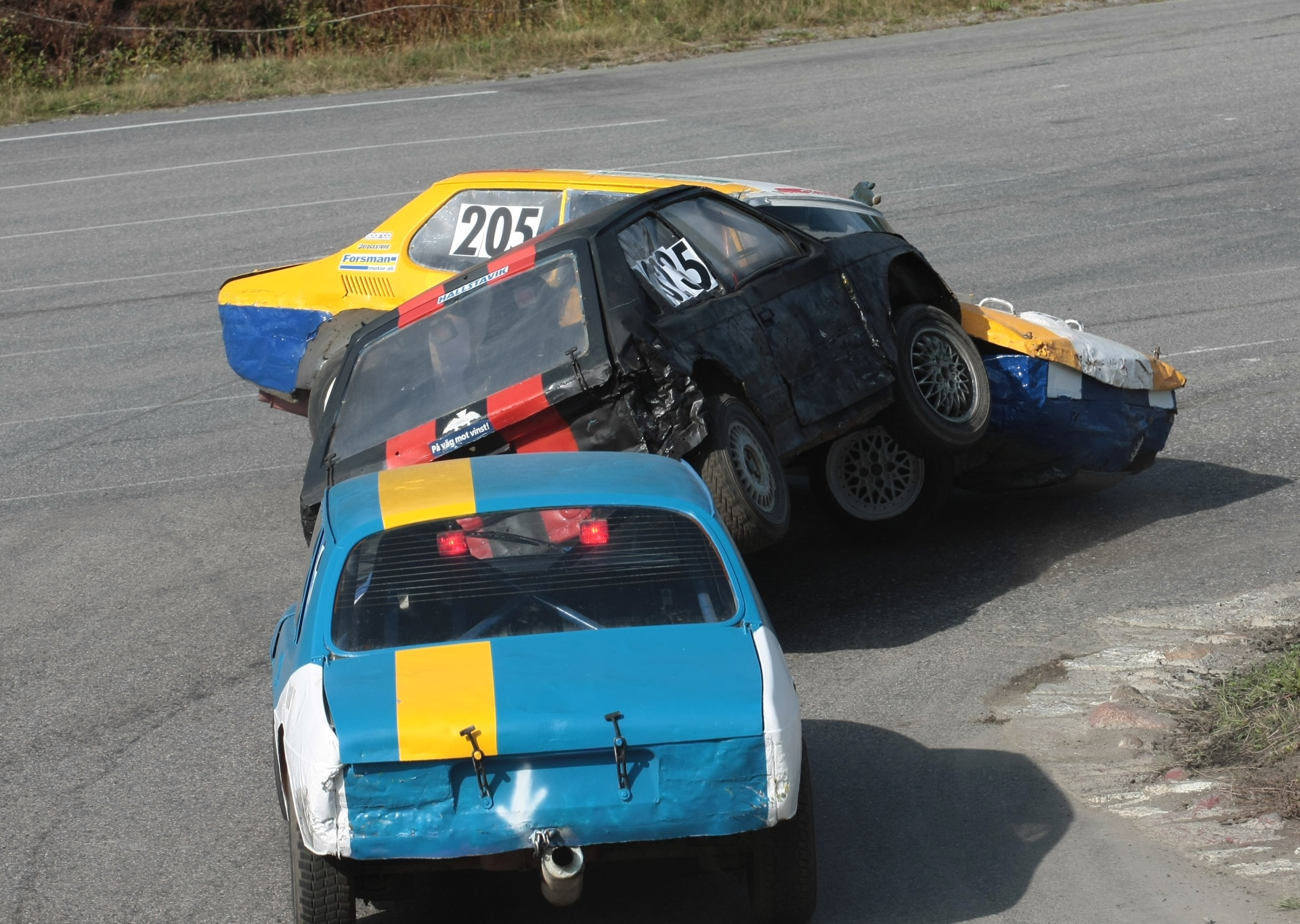
Folkrace crash on Högstabanan in Haninge, Sweden

The races are run on special gravel or tarmac tracks, 2,400 metres (1.5 mi) in length. The tracks are designed to limit the top speed to 80 km/h (50 mph), but on most of the tracks speeds of over 120 kilometres per hour (75 mph) can be reached. The competitions are divided into different classes depending on age and gender. Participants can be as young as 14 years of age.

The race is divided into different heats in which six cars usually compete. The driver who wins a race is awarded seven points; the runner-up receives five points; the driver who finished third gets four points, and so on. When all the heats have been driven, the total score is calculated and the top six drivers get to race in the A final, the next six in the B final, and so on. The winner of the A final wins the event.

To maintain its inexpensive nature, there is a rule on car costs. The races are run in standard cars which must meet certain minimum safety regulations. In Finland, cars must not be all-wheel drive and cannot be powered by diesel engines; they must also be family cars with a minimum of four seats, and no mid-engine layout. Anyone can place a fixed-price bid on any car, and the buyer is then chosen by draw. The fixed price in Finland is €2,000 (≈US$2,200) or 8,000 SEK (≈US$800) in Sweden. Refusing to sell is grounds for having one's competition license revoked; however, participants with handicaps can get an exemption if they require special equipment in their cars. Personal equipment such as the seat and safety harness are not included in the sale. This type of system eliminates the motivation for sinking extensive amounts of work and money into a folk racing car.

Folk racing is a full-contact sport like banger racing. While collisions do happen, and cars make contact with each other, intentionally ramming or obstructing a competitor is forbidden, and the safety rules are strict, so that teenagers (14 to 17 years old) and drivers without a regular driver's license may participate.

== In popular culture ==
- In series 12, episode 3 of Top Gear (2008), James May competes in a Finnish folkrace after receiving training from Mika Häkkinen.
- The 2018 video game Wreckfest features folk racing among its variety of demolition derby events.
- The 2020 video game Teardown features a DLC called Folkrace in which the player competes in folkraces.
- The 2024 documentary Folkrace, a Swedish film which follows two young women in rural Sweden.
- The 2025 video game My Winter Car features folkrace-styled cars participating in ice races on a frozen lake in Finland.

== See also ==
- Autograss
- Autocross
- Stock car racing

== Resources ==
- 2017 AKK official rules for Finland
- Contest Rules of SBF for Sweden
