= SCCA RallyCross =

Car racing competition in North America

A Subaru pictured during a RallyCross competition

RallyCross, also known as RallyX, is a type of car competition in the United States and Canada, sanctioned by Sports Car Club of America (SCCA). It is a timed event that involves solo driving on grass or dirt and can be considered "autocross on the dirt." As with autocross, the emphasis is on driver skill and handling rather than absolute speed, with frequent corners generally keeping speeds below 60 mph (100 km/h). In many ways, RallyCross is to rally racing as autocross is to road racing.

== Influences ==
SCCA RallyCross is separate from the wheel-to-wheel motorsport of rallycross, which commonly takes place on purpose built circuits in Europe. RallyCross also has close ties to competition stage rally, and is seen as a more attainable form of dirt racing. RallyCross is performed in a safer environment than stage rally, due to the lower speeds, proximity to aid, and larger run-off areas.

== Events ==
=== Planning ===
SCCA RallyCross events are planned months in advance. A SCCA RallyCross must be run on a large open piece of ground free of hazardous debris such as large rocks and trees. Courses are laid out with pylons (cones) and typically are 30–90 seconds in time. Speeds don't see higher than highway speeds and going higher than 2nd gear is a rarity. Throughout the day of competition the surface quality is likely to change drastically as gravel or dirt is worn away and ruts are created and deepened or even as snow and ice melt. It is because of these requirements that finding a location for an event is sometimes the most difficult part of event planning. When a site is chosen and the appropriate paperwork (including sanctioning and insurance) is filled out the next step is site preparation. The site must be further prepared by removing debris and planning the course for race day.

=== Working ===
On the day of the event the cones that will outline the course are laid out and any last minute adjustments are made. There are many jobs to be done during the competition itself. The organizers are responsible for assigning jobs to the appropriate people and seeing that they get done. Before any of the cars are allowed on course they must go through a technical-safety inspection which is handled by a tech inspector (also known as a scrutineer). This person must be familiar with how to check the safety of a vehicle (tech inspections do not check for car compliance). A group of people must also work in timing and scoring, keeping all the day's times straight. The last and most visible job is that of the corner worker. This position is almost always filled by the racers that are not racing during a given heat (round of competition). Corner workers are in charge of replacing knocked over cones and reporting the penalty to timing and scoring and in some cases may be required to tell a driver to stop in the case of an emergency.

=== Scoring ===
Often the layout of the course will change throughout the day as the course must move away from dangerous ruts and other obstacles that are formed by the cars during competition. Each run made on the course could be drastically different than the last for a given driver. Instead of taking the best time out of a number of runs, the times for each run are summed together. Added to this time is an additional 2 seconds for every cone the car hit and 10 seconds for any gate that was missed. The winner is determined by the lowest combined time. RallyCross events have one car on course with no wheel to wheel or pass other cars. This process is similar to the timing for stage rally with individual runs over the same course instead of varying special stages.

== Classes ==
SCCA RallyCross events are open to all closed-top production based automobiles that are capable of passing a simple technical inspection. The vehicles are classed by drive train, modifications allowed, and in some cases power. The SCCA's guidelines for vehicle classification are as follows:

=== Stock ===
This category is for cars that are nearly stock with very few upgrade allowances. Modifications improving the safety or reliability of the car are generally allowed, assuming they provide no performance advantage. While engine cooling radiators may be replaced with an equivalent or larger version, the installation of aftermarket non-engine cooling systems, such as oil-cooling or transmission-cooling radiators is not permitted. Roll bars/cages may also be added, but interior modifications to install roll cages must be kept to a minimum. Allowed performance upgrades include the use of high-performance consumables, such as brake pads, DOT-approved tires, or clutch discs. Other performance upgrades are also permitted, including the removal or replacement of the exhaust downstream of the catalytic converter (known as a cat-back exhaust), the installation of a performance air filter (assuming it fits into the stock housing), conditional wheel up-sizing or down-sizing, and the addition, replacement, or removal of one sway bar. The category is further broken down into:

SR	Stock Rear Wheel Drive
SF	Stock Front Wheel Drive
SA	Stock All Wheel Drive

=== Prepared ===
Prepared is the category above Stock. Any modification from Rally Stock is permitted, along with the inclusion of more direct performance mods. Upgrades are generally limited to "bolt-on" modifications, as well as the removal or modification of interior components including air-bags, headliners, or sunroofs. Most components of a forced induction system, including a turbocharger or supercharger, may not be replaced. However, supercharger pulleys and drive belts, along with boost regulation systems for turbochargers, can be replaced. Any type and size of wheels and tires are allowed in this category. Suspension modifications are generally unrestricted assuming the use of a direct-fit replacement, such as a performance coil-over kit, but custom-fabrication is limited. Prepared is broken down further into:

PR	Prepared Rear Wheel Drive
PF	Prepared Front Wheel Drive
PA	Prepared All Wheel Drive

=== Modified ===
Modified is the category above Prepared. In 2012, the former Modified 2WD class officially split into Modified RWD and Modified FWD, though some regions still use the old M2 classing. Vehicle and restrictions are largely based on safety, and the removal of structural components or body panels is generally disallowed. Additionally, vehicles must remain recognizable as their stock counterpart, and engine mounting locations may not be changed. Most log booked race cars fall under this category. The category is divided into:

MR	Modified Rear Wheel Drive
MF	Modified Front Wheel Drive
MA	Modified All Wheel Drive

=== Truck ===
Added in July of 2025, the Truck Category is the newest class, open to rear wheel drive (RWD) pickup trucks. All modifications from the Prepared Category are allowed. The truck class is the only class with a homologation requirement, with a minimum of 4,000 vehicles sold to the public in the United States within a 36-month period. Certain unique requirements exist for the truck class, including: a manufacturer's GVWR less than 6,000 lbs., a naturally aspirated engine with a displacement no more than 4,800 cubic centimeters (4.8 liters), a minimum width no less than 95% of the truck's height, and a truck bed behind and separate from the cabin of the truck.

=== Constructors (Exhibition Only) ===
This category was officially recognized in 2018 to allow vehicles other than standard production vehicles, such as Dune Buggies, Sandrails, Kit Cars, fabricated tube-frame vehicles and other custom built vehicles to enter RallyCross competition. In 2022, the rulebook was amended to include vehicles modified "in excess of the Modified Category requirements." Like the previous 3 categories, the Constructor class is separated, but only into two-wheel-drive and four-wheel-drive classes, with no distinction between front-wheel-drive and rear-wheel-drive. This class is not offered at national events.

C2	Constructor Two Wheel Drive
C4	Constructor Four Wheel Drive

=== Side-By-Side / UTV ===
Introduced in 2019, this class allows side-by-side recreational vehicles (also known as Utility Task Vehicles or UTVs) to compete in RallyCross events. Most modifications from the Prepared Category are allowed, except those specifically disallowed in the rulebook. At this time, there are no sub-categories of the UTV class.
