= Rallycross =

Form of sprint style automobile racing

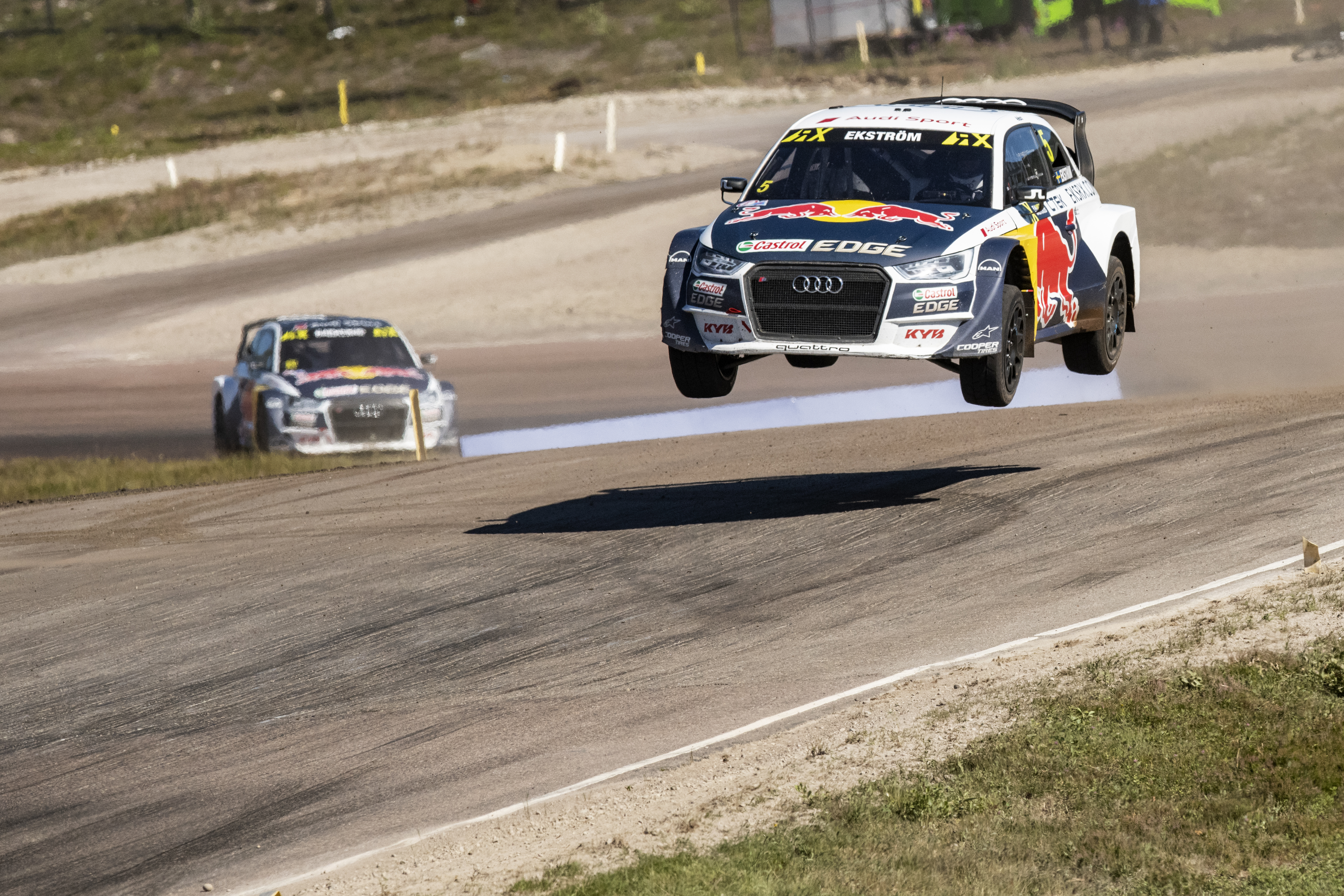
- Rallycross takes place on undulating, mixed-surface circuits
- Highest governing body: Fédération Internationale de l'Automobile
- First played: 1967

Characteristics
- Type: Outdoor

Presence
- Olympic: No
- World Games: No

Rallycross is a form of sprint style motorsport held on a mixed-surface racing circuit using modified production touring cars or prototype racing cars. It began in the 1960s as a cross between rallying and autocross.

It is popular in European countries. Internationally, the Fédération Internationale de l'Automobile (FIA) organise the European Rallycross Championships.

== History ==
=== Origin ===
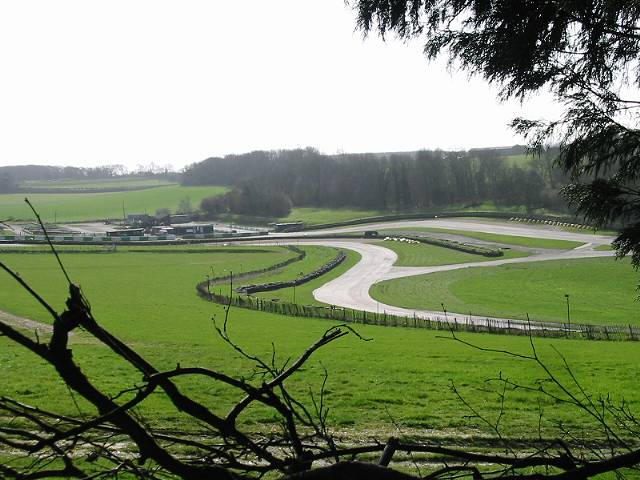
Rallycross was born on 4 February 1967 at Lydden Circuit

The discipline was created for television, and first shown on 4 February 1967. ABC Weekend TV producer and ITV's World of Sport director, Robert Reed, had covered the RAC Rally of Great Britain for TV in November 1966 but had struggled to present it in a way that would appeal to mass audiences. His vision was "to combine the thrills of autocross with the ordeals of rallying, reducing seven days and 3,000 miles to seven minutes and one mile."

Reed enlisted the help of Bud Smith (d. 1994) and the Tunbridge Wells Centre of the 750 MC to organise an event and devise the rules. They invited well-known professional rally drivers to Lydden Circuit in Kent, a circuit with grass racing history which had installed short sections of chalk and tarmac. Set in a natural amphitheatre with varying gradients and with mixed-surfaces, the circuit allowed four cameras to keep visibility of all the cars all of the time. This first rallycross was won by later Formula One driver and Rally Monte Carlo winner Vic Elford in an original Porsche 911, ahead of Brian Melia in a Ford Lotus Cortina and Tony Fall in a BMC Mini Cooper S.

Another two rallycrosses were made for TV at Lydden, broadcast on 11 March and 29 July 1967, before the new World of Sport Rallycross Championship for the ABC TV viewers started with round one broadcast on 23 September, to be followed by round two on 7 October, the latter being watched by up to 1.2m viewers. The series was run over a total of six rounds (three at Lydden and three at Croft in Yorkshire) and was won by Englishman Tony Chappell (Ford Escort Twin Cam), who became the first Rallycross champion after winning the final round of the new series on 6 April 1968 at Lydden.

The first international rallycross event was televised live from Lydden on 25 November 1967, organised to coincide with the timing of the RAC Rally. Famous drivers contesting the rally from abroad such as Timo Makinen, Simo Lampinen and Rauno Aaltonen were invited to drive for a "rest of the world" team in a match versus a Great Britain team. However, due to the rally being cancelled at the last minute on the evening of 17 November due to an outbreak of foot-and-mouth disease, many foreign drivers immediately went home. Subsequently, only British drivers competed in the maiden international rallycross event one week later, which was won by Andrew Cowan in a works Hillman Imp. Thames Estuary Automobile Club's (TEAC) clubman's rallycross was held the day after. It opened up the new sport to up to 100 amateur competitors and helped pave the way for the growth of rallycross as a participation sport, not just a TV spectacle. The Motor Sport Division of the Royal Automobile Club wasted no time in claiming authority over the new discipline, adding Rallycross to their Motor Sport Year Book for 1968. It gave the definition: "Rallycross—A race or speed event which takes place on a combination of sealed and unsealed surface as part of a permanent circuit."

After one and a half years and several rallycross events at Lydden as well as Croft Circuit (near Darlington) the BBC adopted the young sport for its Grandstand programme while ITV dropped it after the British Rallycross Winter Series 1968/69. In 1969, Lydden Circuit and Croft Circuit were joined by another RX venue, Cadwell Park in Lincolnshire. However, while both Lydden and Croft nowadays are still in use for rallycross, Cadwell Park dropped this type of car racing from its schedule. By that time, there were nearly ten million Britons watching some of the events on television.

=== Expansion to the Netherlands ===
Rob Herzet of AVRO, a Dutch counterpart to Robert Reed at ABC, discovered rallycross during a visit to Great Britain in 1968 and immediately believed in its potential for the television viewers. Herzet contacted the race and rally driver and journalist, Gerard van Lennep, who agreed to help organise an event. He found a suitable venue at a military testing ground near the town of Venlo, close to the Dutch-German border. A second at Elst in Gelderland was also found, but aid offered by the army turned the decision into the favour of Venlo.

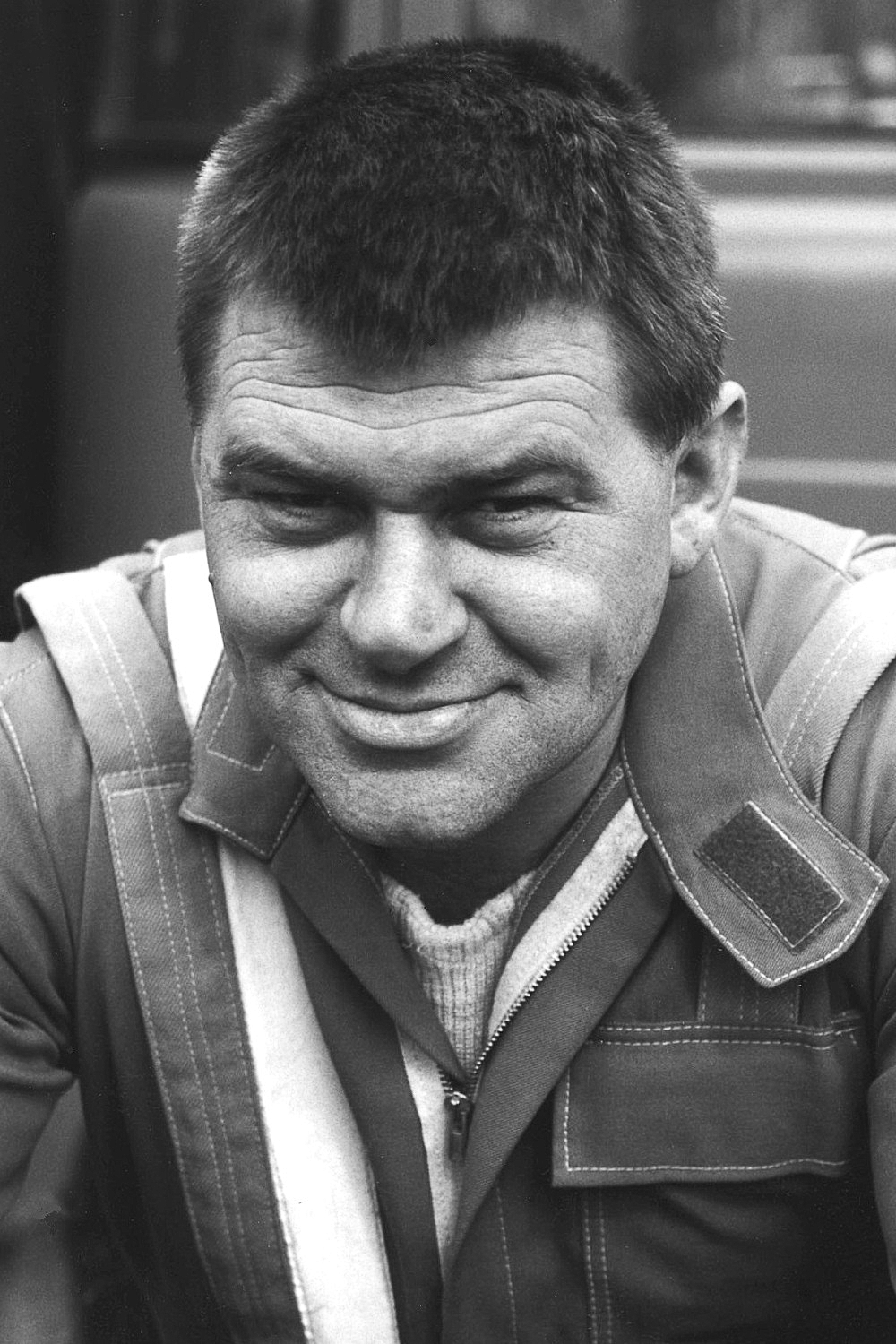
Dutch rallycross ace Jan de Rooy (1979)

On Saturday 7 June 1969 the first rallycross event on the European continent was held. The circuit consisted of a section of concrete runway, loose sections through heathland and a hollow, about 40 metres long and 10 metres deep, usually used for tank testing. Although the soft heath soil and the muddy hollow hampered most of the cars, the event produced much fun for all concerned as well as the TV audience. Overall victory went eventually to Hans Kok and his valuable NSU 1200 TT.

AVRO approved another three rounds counting towards a so-called AVRO-Trophy and on 16 August of the same year, NSU campaigner Hans Kok claimed the first national Dutch rallycross title. On October 4, 1969, Holland saw its last Rallycross event of the first season, a one-off race organised on a temporary track that was quickly set up on pastureland near the ‘Europahal’ at the town of Elst, halfway between Arnhem and Nijmegen. Here it was young Briton ‘Jumping’ Jeff Wiliamson who drove his Riley 1300 to overall victory. On 1 November the Dutch Rallycross Association was founded and, during 1970, organised another five events at Venlo. For 1971 the Nederlandse Rallycross Vereniging (NRV) moved the sport to its new continental home at Valkenswaard near Eindhoven. The Eurocircuit opened on Saturday 17 April with a race that was won by Jan de Rooy and his DAF 555 Coupé 4WD, and became the first track in the World that was especially designed and built purely for rallycross purposes.

=== Expansion to Australia ===
Rallycross came to Australia in 1969 with a one off meeting at Leppington in New South Wales. Events were held at Calder Park Raceway in Melbourne until the mid-1970s and at the Catalina Park circuit in Katoomba in New South Wales from 1972 until the early 1980s. Circuits at Towac near Orange in New South Wales as well as Tailem Bend and Whyalla in South Australia were also used, but after a dozen or so years the sport faded in Australia. Peter Brock was especially successful driving for the Holden Dealer Team in a supercharged Holden Torana GTR.

The inaugural Australian Rallycross Championship was held at the Tailem Bend circuit on 24 June 1979 and was won by Larry Perkins, driving a 2.0-litre Volkswagen Beetle for Kruger Motors. This was the only Australian Rallycross Championship to be contested.

A national rallycross championship was set to return to Australia in 2015 in the form of the Extreme Rallycross Championship, originally scheduled to consist of seven events held across 2015 and 2016. However, the series was cancelled after just one event had been held due to a lack of entries. A proposed Victorian championship, titled Rallycross Australia, was also cancelled before a single event had been run.

=== Soviet Union ===
The first rallycross in the Soviet Union is believed to have taken place in Estonia in 1978.

=== United States ===
In October 2009 Rally America (for two years operating under the tag RallyCar) announced it would begin sanctioning European style rallycross events in the United States. The inaugural season of the RallyCar Rallycross Championship, held in 2010, featured four events and several rally, rallycross and drifting competitors have shown an interest in contesting these races. All four events (August 29, October 3, November 6, November 7) were organised at New Jersey Motorsports Park.

A closed-format circuit race called Rallycross was a regular event at the X Games for some years. It was first added to the X Games XVI in 2010 under the name of SuperRally. This event involved heavily modified production cars with turbocharged engines running at 600 hp, all-wheel drive, sequential gearboxes, and offroad style suspension tuned for long jumps.

The Global RallyCross Championship was a Red Bull-sponsored championship that began in 2011 with five rounds in Irwindale, California (The Revolution), Snoqualmie, WA (Twin Peaks), Fountain, CO (Last Chance) and X Games 17 in the streets of Downtown Los Angeles. The series had several popular drivers such as Tanner Foust, Ken Block, Travis Pastrana, Finn Marcus Grönholm, Kiwi Rhys Millen, Dave Mirra, Frenchman Stéphane Verdier, Swede Michael Jernberg and Briton Liam Doran. The events were televised on ESPN. In 2012, the series grew to seven events run in conjunction with NASCAR Sprint Cup and IndyCar weekends as well as X Games 18 in Los Angeles. Several marques fielded factory- or importer-supported efforts including Ford, Hyundai, Subaru and Dodge. In 2013 the series went to Foz do Iguaçu, Brazil, and Munich, Germany, and a rained-out event in Barcelona, Spain.

In 2013, GRC Lites made their debut in Loudon, New Hampshire, with the series most exciting race held at Atlanta Motor Speedway pitting professional European rallycross drivers against newcomer, American Mitchell DeJong. Global Rallycross was also featured in X Games this year, held at the Irwindale Raceway. American newcomer, Mitchell deJong joined the series and made history as the youngest to win the silver medal in X-Games in his first attempt at age 16.

In 2014 the Global Rallycross Championship Series travelled to tracks across the U.S. and Canada. The series travelled to Circuit of the Americas in Austin, Texas where American driver, Mitchell deJong made history again when he became the youngest to be invited and to win the gold medal in X-Games.

In 2018, the Circuit of the Americas in Austin, Texas, hosted the World Rallycross race event again on September 29–30 at the purpose-built track.

The Americas Rallycross Championship began competition in 2018. However, it was cancelled after the 2019 season due to a lack of sponsors.

Pastrana launched his own rallycross championship, Nitrocross, in 2021. However, in October 2024 all planned events were cancelled and the series was paused indefinitely.

== Race format ==
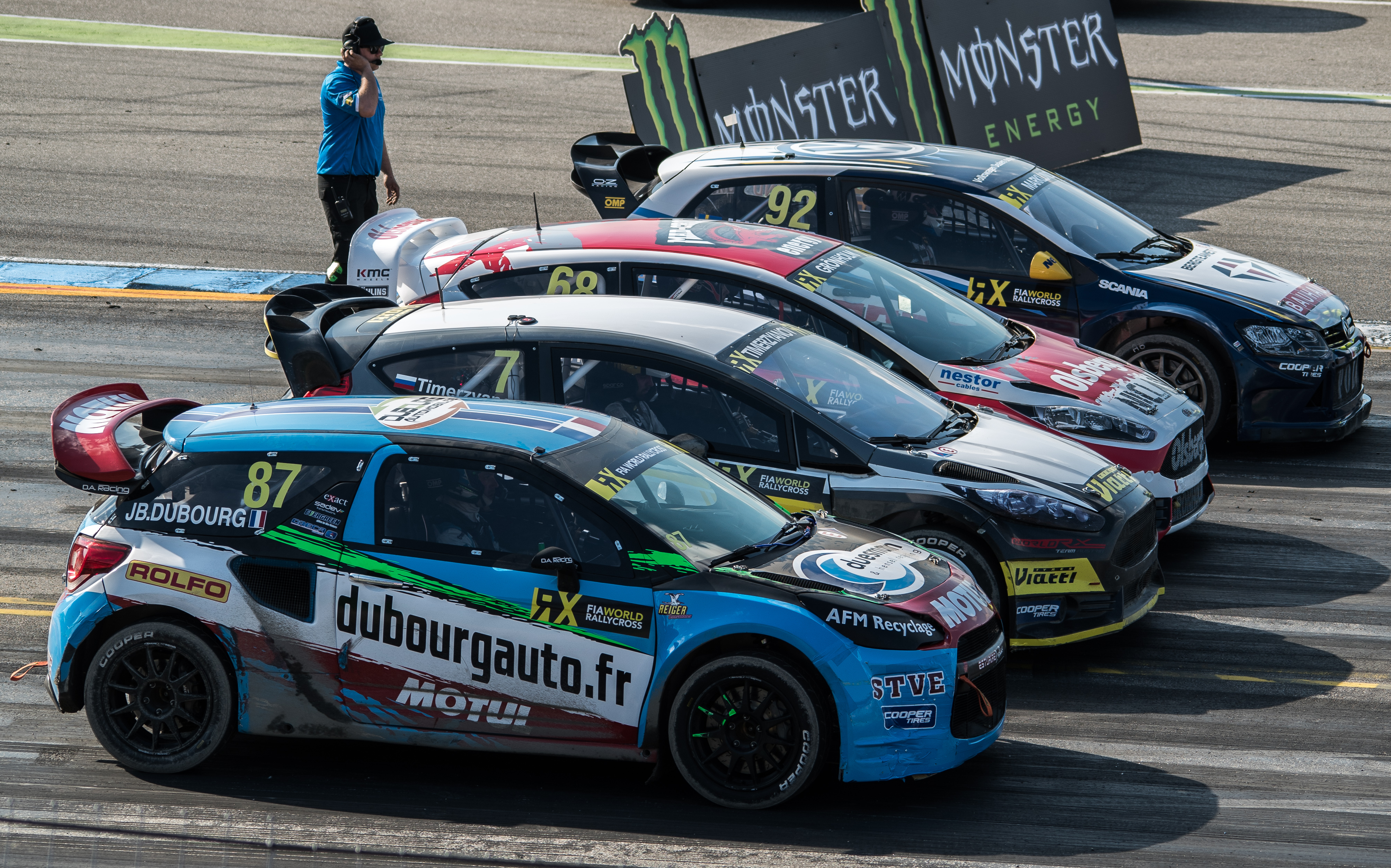
Cars starting a race, here four abreast

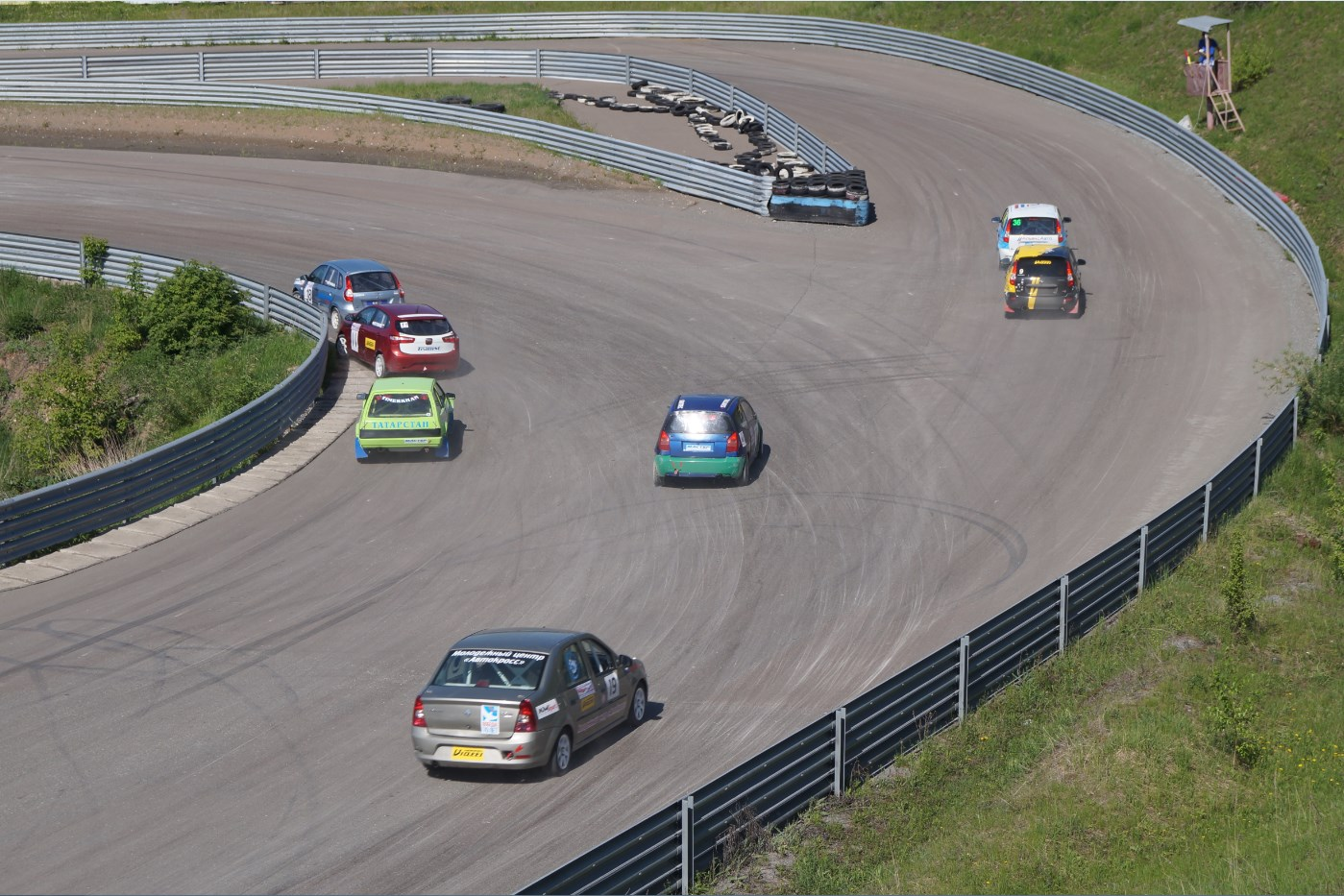
Cars entering a joker lap section of a circuit

Rallycross races run up to 8 cars starting simultaneously on a short circuit of both sealed (asphalt) and unsealed (gravel or mud) surfaces. The number of laps completed is usually low to keep the races short at about 3 minutes. Events typically feature a series of heats with the total run times being used to form a classification. Where there are many competitors the results can form qualification for advancing to knock-out rounds and a final to determine a winner.

In many series, like the FIA World Rallycross Championship, a joker lap must be completed at least once. This is done by driving an extended section of the circuit which can serve to separate or regroup the cars. It adds a tactical element to the racing as having a clearer track may allow for faster driving as an alternative to overtaking, or the re-join point adds risk of contact or an entertaining battle for position.

The sprint nature of the discipline means there is little time to settle into a race or to hold back to protect a lead as may be found in other forms of motor racing. Nor is there need to protect tyres or engine wear as there is usually time given between heats to repair or maintain vehicles.

== Series ==
=== International ===
==== FIA European Rallycross Championship and FIA World Rallycross Championship ====
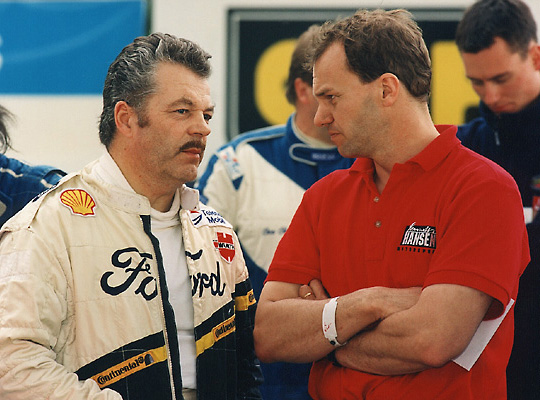
These two drivers wrote rallycross history: Martin Schanche (left; 6 ERC titles) and archrival Kenneth Hansen (14 ERC titles)

The first FIA World Rallycross Championship (World RX) took place from 4–5 May 2014, alongside the FIA European Rallycross Championship (Euro RX), the latter formerly known as FIA European Championships for Rallycross Drivers. Former World Rally Championship champion Petter Solberg took first place to become the first FIA World Rallycross Championship winner.

The 2014 FIA World Rallycross Championship consists of 12 events globally for the Supercar category.

FIA World and European Rallycross Championship cars are built based on production car body shells of vehicles homologated for Group A and Group N, or permitted by a special FIA list for non-homologated cars to be used in rallycross but are extensively modified.

==== RallyX ====
RallyX was established in 2014 and has classes including 4wd and 2wd supercars and crosscars. Its calendar travels across Europe including Montalegre in Portugal and Estering in Germany.

=== National ===
==== United Kingdom ====
The Motorsport UK British Rallycross Championship is the national series in the United Kingdom. The calendar features circuits including Lydden Hill in England, Pembrey in Wales and also Mondello Park in the Republic of Ireland, and Loheac, France.

== Cars ==
=== Electric rallycross ===
Before the 2021 FIA World Rallycross Championship, the RX2 class was dropped, and a new RX2e electric car class was introduced. It was co-developed by Olsbergs MSE and QEV Technologies, and features a 250 kW powertrain. Likewise before the 2021 FIA World Rallycross Championship, the Supercar category was discontinued and a RX1e electric car class was introduced. It consists of RX1 cars (former Supercars) retrofitted with two 250 kW electric motors (equivalent of 680 horsepower) and a 52kWh performance battery, supplied by Kreisel Electric.

The FC1-X electric car was co-developed by Olsbergs MSE and QEV Technologies. It debuted at the 2022 Race of Champions and became the premier class of Nitro Rallycross for the 2022–23 season.

== See also ==
- Crosskart
- Autocross
- Supermoto
- Motocross
- BMX
- Truck cross
- Dirt track racing
- Folkrace
