= Ice racing =

Form of racing that uses various vehicles on ice

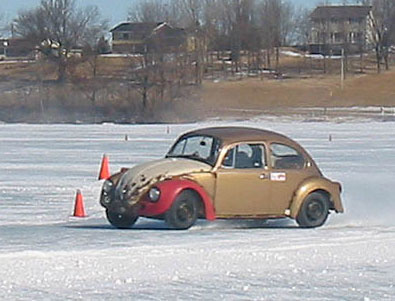
Volkswagen Beetle racing on ice

Ice racing is a form of racing that uses cars, motorcycles, snowmobiles, ATVs, or other motorized vehicles. Ice racing takes place on frozen lakes or rivers, or on groomed frozen lots. As cold weather is a requirement for natural ice, it is usually found at higher latitudes in Canada, the northern United States, and in northern Europe, although limited indoor events are held in warmer climates, typically on ice hockey rinks (motorcycles and ATVs only). Tracks in North America vary from 1/4 mile to several mile-long (~400 m to several kilometer-long) circuits.

== Track ==
Tracks used for ice racing include ovals and road courses. Some tracks are dirt track racing tracks with the snow plowed off them. When there is no natural snow, an icy surface may be created by spraying the dirt surface with water when the temperature is below freezing. Artificial ice tracks (usually speed skating ovals) are used where it is not possible to construct natural ice tracks. Some tracks are made by plowing the snow off an area of a frozen lake. Spectators frequently park their cars around the outside of the track on a frozen lake.

In the UK, ice meetings have been staged at ice rinks. The longest running event, at Telford, features riders using conventional machines with spiked tires. In the late 1960s ice racing was staged at a number of rinks in Scotland and the machines used were rally-based machines with all season tires.

== Tires ==
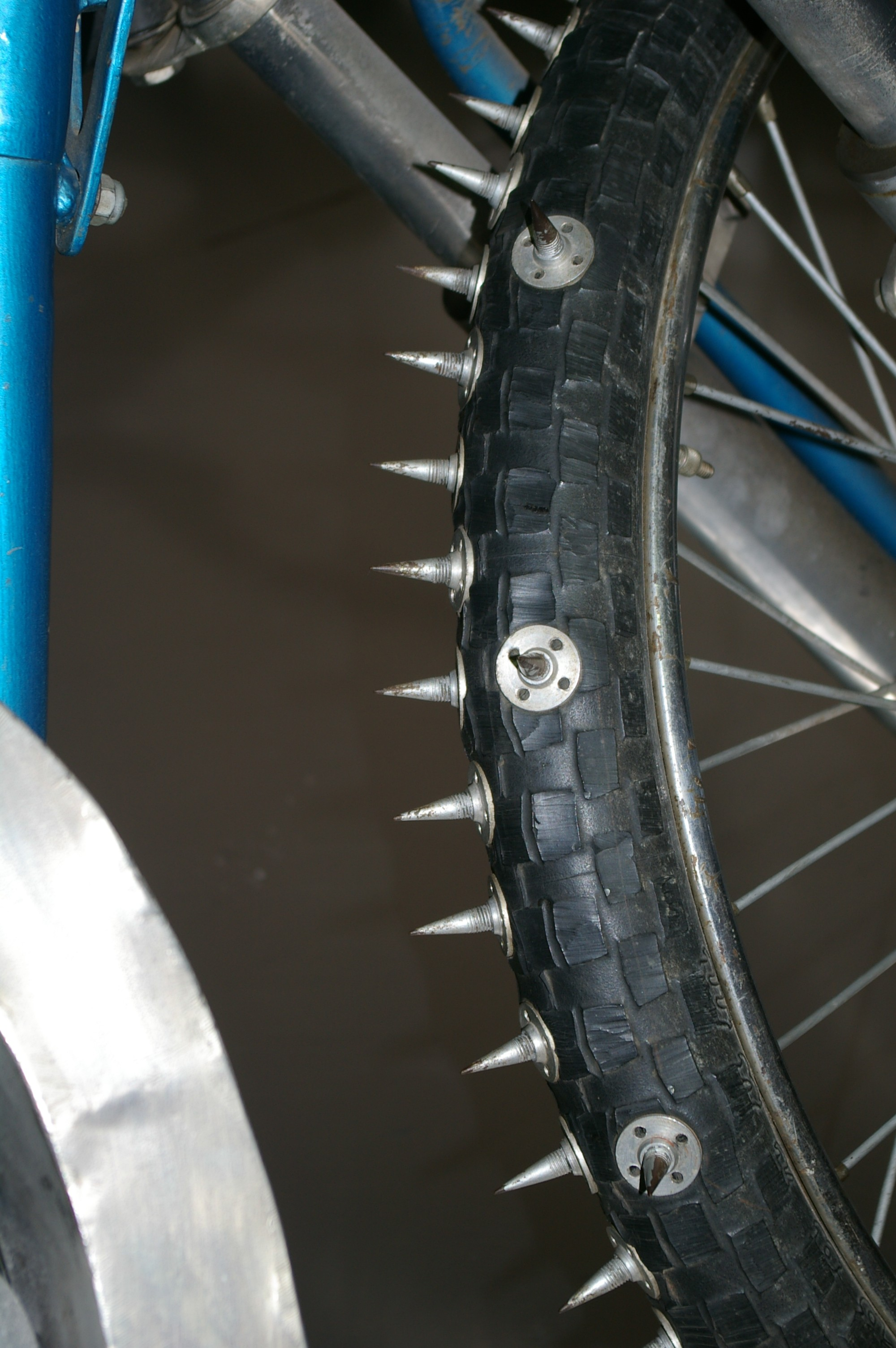
Close-up of a studded tire

Ice racing tires are either studded or non-studded. Studded tires have a stud such as a screw or bolt to provide better traction and increase speed. Some studs are sharpened to increase penetration. Tires cannot be purchased with studs, so the pit crews need to attach the studs to the tires. Through 2008, Menard's Racing in Wisconsin manufactured and sold studded racing tires for cars, and they were required in many ice-racing classes. Cars with studded tires are generally required to contain roll cages and increased safety equipment since they achieve much more speed with the greater cornering abilities.

The sanctioning body's rule book generally specifies the length and type of stud, often with the goal of controlling the level of damage done to the ice surface. Aggressive studs can cause enough damage to be a safety concern as they wear through the ice on successive laps, particularly during door-to-door auto racing.

Non-studded tires are standard production snow tires, as used on highway-use passenger cars in colder climates. Drivers often use winter tires. Favorites among ice-racers include Bridgestone Blizzaks and Nokian Hakkapeliittas.

== Motorcycle ice racing ==
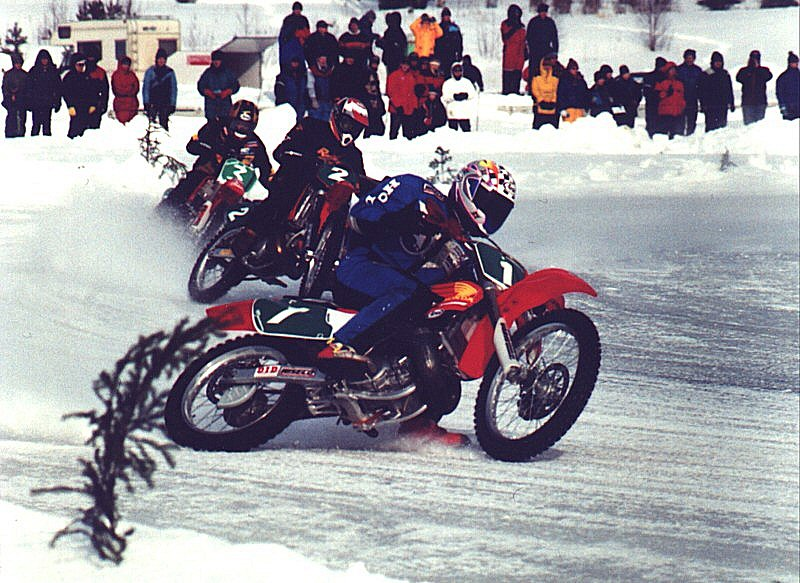
Motorcycle ice road racing

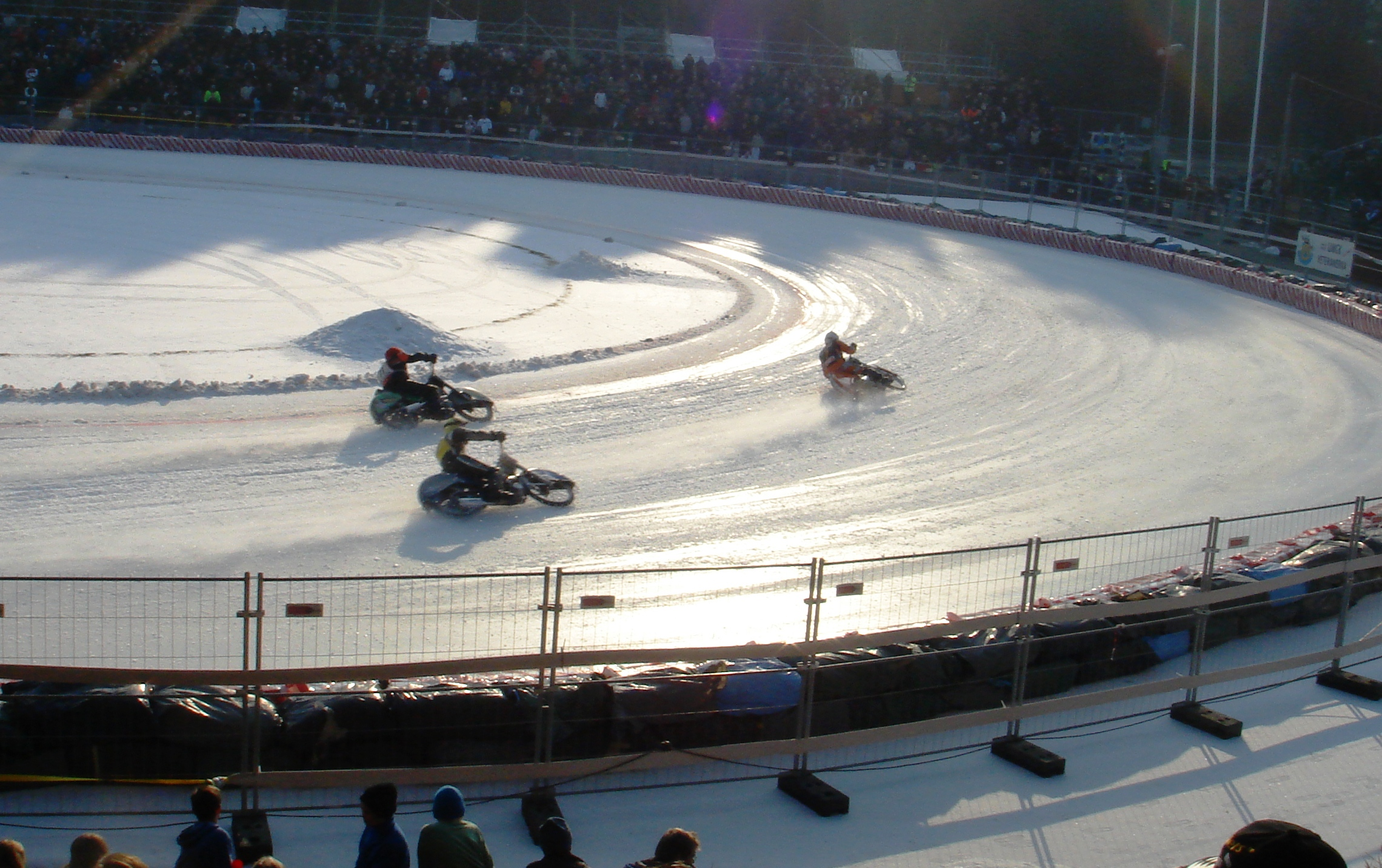
Motorcycle ice racing using studded tires

Ice racing includes a motorcycle class which is the equivalent of speedway on ice. Bikes race anti-clockwise around oval tracks between 260 m (0.16 mi) and 425 m (0.264 mi) in length. The race structure and scoring is similar to Speedway.

The bikes bear a passing resemblance to those used for speedway, but have a longer wheelbase and a more rigid frame. The sport is divided into classes for full-rubber and studded tires. The studded tire category involves competitors riding on bikes with spikes up to 30 millimetres (1.2 in) in length screwed into each tread-less tyre, each bike has 90 spikes on the front tyre and 200–500 on the rear. The use of these spikes in this discipline necessitate the addition of special protective guards (similar to mudguards) over the wheels which extend almost to the ice surface. The spiked tyres produce a tremendous amount of traction and this means two-speed gearboxes are also required. As with speedway, the bikes do not have brakes. Czech made 4-stroke Jawa motorcycles have been the dominant force in this sport.

In the studded tyre class there is no broadsiding around the bends due to the grip produced by the spikes digging into the ice. Instead, riders lean their bikes into the bends at an angle where the handlebars just skim the track surface. Speeds approach 80 mph (130 km/h) on the straights, and 60 mph (97 km/h) on the bends. The safety barrier usually consists of straw bales or banked-up snow and ice around the outer edge of the track.

The riding style required for studded ice racing is different from that used in the other track racing disciplines. This means riders from this discipline rarely participate in Speedway or its other variants and vice versa.

The majority of Fédération Internationale de Motocyclisme sanctioned team and individual meetings are held in Russia, Sweden and Finland, but events are also held in the Czech Republic, Germany, Hungary (since 2000), the Netherlands, and occasionally other countries. Countries that dominated and won the majority of titles in Individual Ice Racing World Championship (held since 1966) and Team Ice Racing World Championship (held since 1979) were the USSR and since 1991—Russia. Canada's national touring series is sanctioned by the Canadian Motorcycle Association.

== Automobile ice racing ==
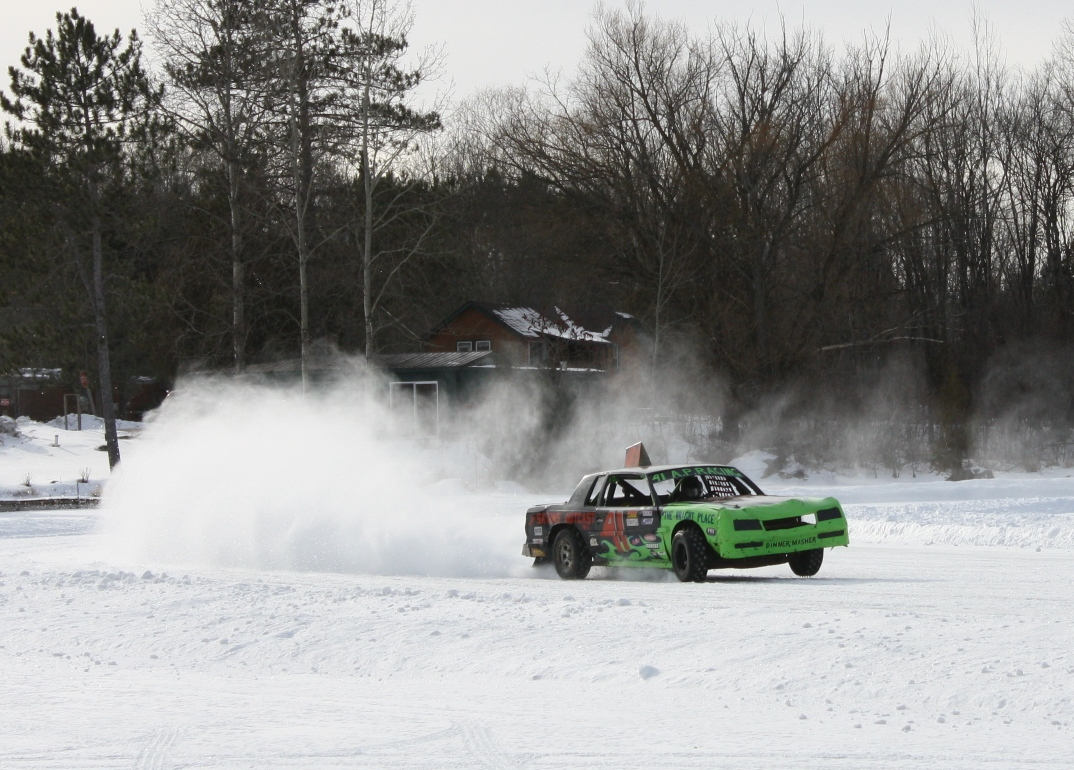
Studded tires on autos causing limited visibility

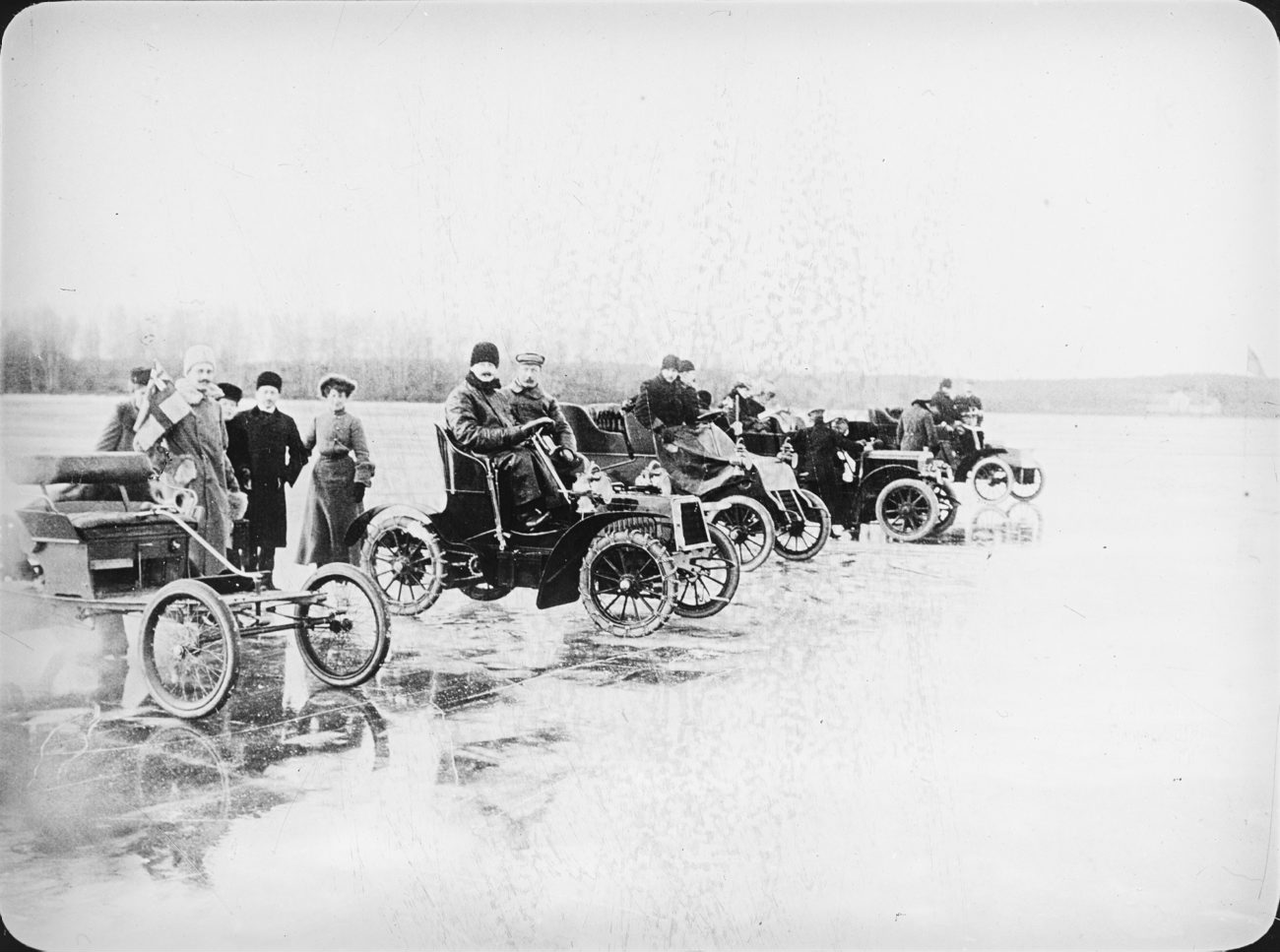
Automobile ice racing in the late 19th century.

Automobile ice races have been most successful in France, where the Trophée Andros series, sponsored by an industrial jam (fruit preserver) manufacturer attracts ex-F1 drivers like Alain Prost or Olivier Panis, manufacturer-backed entries of sophisticated 4WD cars and international television coverage. The Trophée Andros races mainly use damped snow (that is not very different from ice regarding car handling) tracks in French ski resorts with a final race on artificial ice in Paris Stade de France. The 2006 trophy includes one round in Andorra. On several occasions a round also took place in Canada, in the Canadian Challenge, which is held yearly and is the most notable Ice Racing event in North America.

In the 1960s and 1970s, there were two major Ice Racing Championships, the North American Ice Racing Championship and the European Ice Racing Championship. The North American was held in Anchorage, Alaska and their champions include Earl Bennett and Chuck Higgins, while Mexican Formula One driver Pedro Rodríguez won his class and an exhibition race in 1970, and was 2nd overall.

Elsewhere, ice racing has proven to be a largely recreational pastime. There is no professional ice-racing sanctioning body in North America, but there are clubs in several Canadian provinces (Alberta, Ontario, Manitoba, Quebec, Saskatchewan) and American states (New York, Michigan, Maine, Wisconsin, Minnesota, Alaska). Some amateur and professional dirt track and paved track racers use ice racing to hone their skills or to practice for the summer season. Drivers often find that developing the car control skills needed on ice substantially improves their performance on a wet race track.

There is a new class in Canada called SS (street studs) where a car can run with the same modifications as a rubber to ice class, without the need for a roll bar. This same SS classing, although referred to as Super Stud or Studded class, by some American Clubs (such as the Anchorage Alaska Sports Car Lions Club) require any car running studded tires to meet at least IT rules and requires a roll cage and full safety gear. Some clubs even encourage people to ice-race their daily driver, and have strict no-contact rules to allow that safely.

In Russia there is a rally raid event, called the Northern Forest run on ice and snow in the last days of February in the outskirts of the city of St Petersburg. Also, in Russia there is popular winter track racing, where pilots race on short ice oval track, usually hippodromes, covered with ice during winter.

Conventional rallying also takes place on ice. Most notably, the tarmac of the Monte Carlo Rally is occasionally covered with snow and ice. The Sno*Drift rally in Michigan is another example of such events.

=== Race vehicle ===
There are many classes of racing vehicles. The racing vehicles are frequently divided into studded or non-studded tire classes. Nearly all dirt track racing vehicles could be raced on ice. Flying snow and ice powder limits visibility, so some vehicles are required to have a bright light, normally red or yellow, on the back of the car for greater visibility in the powder.

Non-studded cars are selected by their weight since non-studded cars cannot carry high speed through a corner and cars cannot get much power to the slippery surface. Lightweight front-wheel drive cars are generally the quickest.

== Ice racing in film ==
Ice racing was featured in the 1969 James Bond film On Her Majesty's Secret Service with George Lazenby and Diana Rigg as they attempted to evade their pursuers. The track was in Switzerland.

Motorcycle ice racing footage can be seen in the Bruce Brown documentary On Any Sunday.

== Media ==
Ice racing (0:33)
Ice racing stock cars in Wisconsin, USA — 2.55 MB/33 seconds

== See also ==
- Icetrack cycling
- Ice yachting
