= Katsuhiro Ueo =

Japanese professional drifting driver (born 1972)

- Nationality: Japan
- Born: 26 May 1972 (age 54) Tamana, Kumamoto

D1 Grand Prix career
- Debut season: 2001 (D1GP) 2006 (D1SL)
- Current team: Valino Vazestra
- Former teams: Z.S.S. Racing w/ SIFT and Brains, Drift Speed, Team M.O.V.E, NKB Racing, Car Boutique Club, Revolver, Tomei Powered, Cusco Japan, Yuke'S, Ueo Family and Garage SIFT (Privateer)
- Wins: 9 (5 Main Rounds, 1 Exhibition, 3 D1SL)
- Best finish: 1 in 2002 (D1GP) and 2016 (D1SL)

Championship titles
- 2002 (D1GP) 2016 (D1SL): 2

Katsuhiro Ueo (植尾勝浩, Ueo Katsuhiro; 26 May 1972, Tamana, Kumamoto) is a Japanese professional drifting driver, whose currently competing in D1 Grand Prix with a Nissan Silvia S15, well known for formerly using the Toyota AE86 in the series. He is also known as, Therefore, it is (デスカラデスネ/ですからですね Desukara Desune). He is the first driver to win both D1 Grand Prix and D1 Street Legal after winning it in 2002 and 2016 respectively. He is the oldest driver to win D1GP round at 51 years old

== Biography ==
Ueo was into cars from a young age, and started out competing in gymkhana events, starting with a Nissan Skyline R32 GT-R. At one of these events one of his younger colleagues took him to the Touge and challenged him saying that he couldn't do it. So he went out and proved him wrong, and this got him started in drifting. As well as his drifting he is also the owner of tuning shop and used car dealership Racing Garage SIFT.

=== Drifting career ===
To start off his drifting activities, Ueo got hold of his first AE86 which was an AE85-spec Corolla Levin, heavily modified and turned into an AE86. He had owned this car from 1998-1999 and had entered several drifting events (Carboy's DoriCon GP, Battle Magazine's BM-Cup, P's Cars) at the time.

In 2000, Ueo converted the Levin to a Trueno. He entered and competed at the Kyushu Ikaten, which was held at Mobility Omuta on March 29, 2000 (he won in the finals against Masao Suenaga). The 2000-spec AE85 was later repainted cream in mid-2000 with revised changes and he won the 6th All-Japan Ikaten competition at Bihoku Circuit on Sept. 7, 2000.

In late 2000, Ueo got hold of a genuine AE86 Sprinter Trueno (GTV Trim) which he swapped parts out of the AE85 to the new AE86. This car was more commonly known as Professor, due to a decal that was placed on the side of the car at the time. He continued to use this AE86 in D1 for the 2001 season until the 2006 season.

D1 Grand Prix and D1 Street Legal

Ueo has been competing in the D1 Grand Prix since the first season, debuting at Round 3. He has always done well, getting his first win at the first round in 2002 and going on to take the championship.

In 2003, Ueo had switch to two different Truenos starting in 2003 at the fourth round in Fuji Speedway until the end of the D1 2004 season, which he used an AE85 (different from 2000 one) while the AE86 was used as a T-car, it was also the car that he had brought over for the Irwindale Speedway exhibition match, which he won after defeating Nobuteru Taniguchi in the finals. He had a decent season but placed third overall. At the championship round finale, he was ranked second and he was only 18 points behind Youichi Imamura but mechanical issues occurred during the practice sessions. He was unable to pull through the first round regardless of the quick repairs and it forced him to sit at third overall with Nobushige Kumakubo being ranked 2nd overall.

In 2004, Ueo had a tough season, either unable to pull through the First Round or Best 16. It turned out however, that the AE85's chassis strength had started to weaken since the reinforcement method done to it was by the use of rivets instead of the stitch-welding method, which the AE86 had used.

In 2005, Ueo went back to the AE86 for the 2005 and 2006 season, and he was able to retain a decent season again, after getting his second victory at Round 2 of 2005. Ueo also accomplish of getting three straight 100 tansou runs at the sevenh round of 2005.

In 2006, Ueo entered the D1 Street Legal series, starting out with the AE86 in the first round. On-wards however, he changed to a Nissan Silvia S15 for NKB Racing and his performance has been successful despite using a different car. During Round 7 of 2006, he attempted to pilot the NKB SR20-powered Nissan Fairlady Z Z33 but he could not proceed to the Best 16 during the qualifying round as the rear lift-gate had lifted open, and was deemed as a mechanical issue from the judges. This was also the last season that he would drive the AE86.

In 2007, Ueo changed teams and as well with a new car in the main series, moving to Team M.O.V.E's Nissan Silvia (S15), the car that won the 2005 championship at the hands of Yasuyuki Kazama while his teammate at the time Hideo Hiraoka was assigned with Team M.O.V.E's second S15, which Kazama had used for the D1GP UK Silverstone and D1GP Las Vegas 2006 Exhibition Matches. He has not adapted well to the new vehicle and finished the season down in 20th place.

In 2015, after the event of Formula D Japan, Ueo made a comeback to D1 Street Legal after a 7-year absence which he picked up a sponsorship with Z.S.S. Racing. He is driving the S15 once again, starting in 2015. He has done very well for the season, earning second overall.

In 2016, following his successful season of 2015, more luck shines on him when he managed to get his first D1SL win at the season opener after 10 years of being in series, as well as being a D1GP veteran to still compete in the spin-off series. After earning two victories and a 3rd-place podium, he was crowned as the 2016 D1SL Series Champion.

In 2017, Ueo went back to competing in the main series as D1 Street Legal was halted for the rest of year. He had an average performance with recurring issues on his D1SL S15 machine but he has ended up getting into the Best 16 for Odaiba Rd.1 and Rd.2, and getting into the Best 8 at the Tsukuba Rd.3. For the final round of the season, he debuted a new S15 that was powered by the Nissan GT-R's engine, the VR38DETT which is bolted to a Holinger sequential transmission that produces 1000ps.

In 2019, Ueo was supported by new tire manufacturers Valino and got into his first final in Tsukuba on round 2 but lost to Masashi Yokoi due to his car losing a body part.

In 2020, Ueo finally tasted victory again, winning in his home course at Autopolis beating his former Ikaten teammate Naoto Suenaga and break the record for the oldest driver to win in D1GP at 48 years old. He backed up this record by another win in round 3 of the 2023 season at the age of 51 years old.

Formula Drift

Ueo has competed in Formula D starting in 2008, first appearing at the Red Bull Drifting World Championship, which he drove the Wisesquare & Drift Speed-sponsored S15. He would later compete in some of the championship rounds during the following year (2009). His comeback to Formula D was when the series introduced 'Formula D Japan' back in Summer 2014 and competed with his own S15 which was built for the event, as well as his comeback to competitive drifting. He competed again for the 2017 round of Formula D Japan at Okayama Circuit with his D1GP VR38-Powered S15.

== Complete Drifting Results ==
Colour	Result
Gold	Winner
Silver	2nd place
Bronze	3rd place
Green	Last 4 [Semi-final]
Blue	Last 8 [Quarter-final]
Purple	Last 16 (16) [1st Tsuiou Round OR Tandem Battle] (Numbers are given to indicate Top 10 finish)
Black	Disqualified (DSQ) (Given to indicate that the driver has been stripped of their position through disqualification)
White	First Round (TAN) [Tansou OR Qualifying Single Runs]
Red	Did not qualify (DNQ)

- When driver's position are highlighted in blue, this indicates either the driver earned 100pt or 100pt tansou (solo run) bonus has been awarded, with the latter being in use for Pre-2005.

=== D1 Grand Prix ===
Year	Entrant	Car	1	2	3	4	5	6	7	8	Position	Points
2001	Ueo Family	Toyota Sprinter Trueno AE86	EBS	NIK	BHH; 3	EBS; TAN	NIK; 7				8th	24
2002	D'SIFT w/ Cusco & Revolver	Toyota Sprinter Trueno AE86	BHH; 1	EBS; TAN	SGO; 9	TKB; 7	EBS; 4	SEK; 2	NIK; 8		1st	70
2003	Cusco/Yuke's	Toyota Sprinter Trueno AE86	TKB; 7	BHH; 16	SGO; 3						3rd	70
2003	Cusco/Yuke's	Toyota Sprinter Trueno AE85				FUJ; 5	EBS; 4	SEK; 1	TKB; TAN		3rd	70
2004	Cusco/Yuke's	Toyota Sprinter Trueno AE86	IRW; TAN								NC	0
2004	Cusco/Yuke's	Toyota Sprinter Trueno AE85		SGO; TAN	EBS; TAN	APS; 16	ODB; DNQ	EBS; DNQ	TKB		NC	0
2005	Car Boutique Club w/ ERG	Toyota Sprinter Trueno AE86	IRW	ODB; 1	SGO; TAN	APS; 16	EBS; 9	FUJ; 2	TKB; 10		7th	45
2006	NKB Racing w/ SIFT & ERG	Toyota Sprinter Trueno AE86	IRW; TAN	SGO; 16	FUJ; 2	APS; 4	EBS; 9	SUZ; 7		IRW; 16	10th	48
2006	NKB Racing w/ SIFT & ERG	Nissan Fairlady Z Z33							FUJ; TAN		10th	48
2007	Team M.O.V.E with DG-5	Nissan Silvia S15	EBS; 7	FUJ; TAN	SUZ; TAN	SGO; DNQ	EBS; TAN	APS; TAN	FUJ; TAN		20th	8
2009	Drift Speed	Nissan Silvia S15	EBS	APS	OKY; DNQ	OKY; TAN	EBS	EBS	FUJ	FUJ	NC	0
2017	Z.S.S. Racing w/ SIFT & Brains	Nissan Silvia S15	ODB; 14	ODB; 11	TKB; 5	MAI; TAN	EBS	EBS	ODB; TAN		19th	36

=== D1 Street Legal ===
Year	Entrant	Car	1	2	3	4	5	6	7	Position	Points
2006	NKB Racing w/ SIFT & ERG	Toyota Corolla Levin AE86	SEK; 16	EBS	SGO					6th	45
2006	NKB Racing w/ SIFT & ERG	Nissan Silvia S15				FUJ; 3	APS; 16	EBS; 2	SEK; 7	6th	45
2007	Team M.O.V.E w/ DG-5	Nissan Silvia S15	SEK; 16	SUZ; 10	SGO; 16	EBS; 16	SEK; 3			6th	31
2008	Behrman Wisesports w/ Drift Speed	Nissan Silvia S15	EBS; TAN	SUZ; 7	OKA; 8	EBS; TAN	SEK	TKB		18th	21
2015	Z.S.S. Racing w/ SIFT & Brains	Nissan Silvia S15	BHH; 4	MAZ; 9	SET; TAN	MHN; 2	EBS; 7	NIK; 2		2nd	77
2016	Z.S.S. Racing w/ SIFT & Brains	Nissan Silvia S15	BHH; 1	EBS; 1	MHN; 3	MAZ; 1	SET; TAN	NIK		1st	93

Preceded by Nobuteru Taniguchi	D1 Grand Prix Champion; 2002	Succeeded by Youichi Imamura
