= Hideo Hiraoka (racing driver) =

Japanese professional drifting driver (born 1971)

- Nationality: Japan
- Born: 30 April 1971 (age 55) Tochigi, Japan

D1 Grand Prix career
- Debut season: 2001
- Current team: Team Orange
- Wins: 1
- Best finish: 11th in 2006

Previous series
- (previous series with line breaks)

Championship titles
- (championship titles)

Hideo Hiraoka (平岡英郎, Hiraoka Hideo; 30 April 1971, Tochigi) is a Japanese professional drifting driver, currently competing in the D1 Grand Prix series for Team Orange and Yuke’s.

Like many of the drivers in the D1GP, Hiraoka is the owner of his own tuning shop called Proshop Rapid, and so has worked on many of his cars himself.

Hiraoka began competing in the D1 Grand Prix in the first round in 2000, earning second place in round 4 of that year and so showing that he had what it takes. Over the years he has competed in many different cars from a Toyota Corolla Levin AE85 for Team Droo-P, which was converted to a Toyota Sprinter Trueno AE86 and later used by his teammate Toshiki Yoshioka in 2005, Toyota Chaser and Nissan Silvia S15 for Greddy and even a year in a Nissan 350Z once again for Team Droo-P. In 2006, he went back to the Nissan Silvia S15, sponsored by Wisesquare (previously driven by Makoto Sezaki) with which he had much success, getting his first win with that machine, and again, driving Team M.O.V.E.'s second S15 (which Kazama used for D1GP 2006 Silverstone and D1GP 2006 Las Vegas) while his friend and teammate at the time, Katsuhiro Ueo drove the first S15, which was Kazama's 2005 championship car, and to become the fourth member of Team Orange, driving Nobushige Kumakubo's 2006 championship winning Subaru Impreza. So far he has been doing well adapting to the new car, as he has done so often before, though he had a large accident at the Tokyo Drift exhibition match in early 2008.

== Complete Drifting Results ==
Colour	Result
Gold	Winner
Silver	2nd place
Bronze	3rd place
Green	Last 4 [Semi-final]
Blue	Last 8 [Quarter-final]
Purple	Last 16 (16) [1st Tsuiou Round OR Tandem Battle] (Numbers are given to indicate Top 10 finish)
Black	Disqualified (DSQ) (Given to indicate that the driver has been stripped of their position through disqualification)
White	First Round (TAN) [Tansou OR Qualifying Single Runs]
Red	Did not qualify (DNQ)

- When driver's position are highlighted in blue, this indicates either the driver earned 100pt or 100pt tansou (solo run) bonus has been awarded, with the latter being in use for Pre-2005.

=== D1 Grand Prix ===
Year	Entrant	Car	1	2	3	4	5	6	7	8	Position	Points
2001		Nissan 180SX RPS13	EBS; DNQ	NIK	BHH		NIK; TAN				13	18
2001		Nissan Silvia PS13				EBS; 2					13	18
2002	Trust/GReddy Works	Toyota Chaser JZX100	BHH; 10	EBS; TAN	SGO; 8	TKB; DNQ	EBS; 10	SEK; 9	NIK; 3		11	30
2003	Trust/GReddy Works	Nissan Silvia S15	TKB; DNQ	BHH; DNQ	SGO; 16	FUJ; TAN	EBS; TAN	SEK; 16	TKB		-	0
2004	DROO-P w/ Espelier	Toyota Corolla Levin AE85	IRW; TAN	SGO; 9	EBS; 16	APS; 10	ODB; 16	EBS; TAN	TKB; 4		11	20
2005	DROO-P w/ Espelier	Toyota Corolla Levin AE85	IRW; 11								27	3
2005	DROO-P w/ Espelier	Nissan Fairlady Z Z33		ODB; TAN	SGO; 16	APS; TAN	EBS; 16	FUJ; DNQ	TKB; DNQ		27	3
2006	Wisesquare	Nissan Silvia S15	IRW; TAN	SGO; DNQ	FUJ; 16	APS; 10	EBS; 3	SUZ; 1	FUJ; TAN	IRW; TAN	11	41
2007	Team M.O.V.E	Nissan Silvia S15	EBS; TAN	FUJ; 10	SUZ; TAN	SGO; 3	EBS; 16	APS; TAN	FUJ; TAN		16	20
2008	Team Orange	Subaru Impreza GDB	EBS; TAN	FUJ; TAN	SUZ; 11	OKY; DNQ	APS; 15	EBS	FUJ		21	8

== Sources ==
- D1 Grand Prix
