= Tatsuya Sakuma =

Japanese racing driver

- Nationality: Japanese
- Born: 4 July 1974 (age 52) Miyagi, Japan

D1 Grand Prix career
- Debut season: 2001
- Former teams: Team Toyo
- Best finish: 3rd in 2012

Previous series
- (previous series with line breaks)

Championship titles
- (championship titles)

Tatsuya Sakuma (佐久間達也, Sakuma Tatsuya; born 4 July 1974, in Miyagi) is a former Japanese professional drifting driver. He retired from drifting after 2015 D1 Grand Prix season.

Sakuma has competed in the D1GP series since the very beginning, starting out in a Nissan Silvia PS13 He did not do very well, scoring only two points in his first four years. His big break came when he was signed by Aviation Performance Products, who gave him a new Nissan Silvia S15 to drive. In 2005, his first year with APP, he scored 41 points, getting a third and second place and finishing ninth overall. The year after he did even better, finishing seventh overall; this led to him moving to Team Toyo in 2007. Since then he hasn't done so well, Team Toyo S15 obviously not suiting his driving style.

However, in 2011, Sakuma won the exhibition match in Centrair, defeated his teammate Masato Kawabata. This was his first win.

Sakuma had competed in D1GP until 2015. Since 2016, he is not participating in it because he wants to focus on company management, his principal occupation.

== Complete Drifting results ==
Colour	Result
Gold	Winner
Silver	2nd place
Bronze	3rd place
Green	Last 4 [Semi-final]
Blue	Last 8 [Quarter-final]
Purple	Last 16 (16) [1st Tsuiou Round OR Tandem Battle] (Numbers are given to indicate Top 10 finish)
Black	Disqualified (DSQ) (Given to indicate that the driver has been stripped of their position through disqualification)
White	First Round (TAN) [Tansou OR Qualifying Single Runs]
Red	Did not qualify (DNQ)

- When driver's position are highlighted in blue, this indicates either the driver earned 100pt or 100pt tansou (solo run) bonus has been awarded, with the latter being in use for Pre-2005.

=== D1 Grand Prix ===
Year	Entrant	Car	1	2	3	4	5	6	7	8	Position	Points
2001		Nissan Silvia PS13	EBS	NIK; DNQ	BHH	EBS; TAN	NIK				-	0
2002		Nissan Silvia PS13	BHH	EBS; 10	SGO; TAN	TKB; DNQ	EBS; DNQ	SEK	NIK; TAN		30	2
2003		Nissan Silvia PS13	TKB	BHH	SGO; DNQ	FUJ; DNQ	EBS; DNQ	SEK	TKB		-	0
2004		Nissan Silvia PS13	IRW	SGO	EBS	APS	ODB	EBS; 16	TKB; DNQ		-	0
2005	APP	Nissan Silvia S15	IRW	ODB; TAN	SGO; 3	APS; 8	EBS; TAN	FUJ; 16	TKB; 2		9	41
2006	APP	Nissan Silvia S15	IRW; 7	SGO; 16	FUJ; 4	APS; TAN	EBS; TAN	SUZ; 3	FUJ; 7	IRW; 10	7	53
2007	Team Toyo	Nissan Silvia S15	EBS; 9	FUJ; TAN	SUZ; 16	SGO; TAN	EBS; TAN	APS; 4	FUJ; 10		15	23
2008	Team Toyo	Nissan Silvia S15	EBS; TAN	FUJ; 15	SUZ; 12	OKY; DNQ	APS; TAN	EBS	FUJ		22	7

== Sources ==
- D1 Grand Prix
