= Seigo Yamamoto =

Japanese drift driver

Seigo Yamamoto (山本聖剛, Yamamoto Seigo; born April 16, 1971 in Takarazuka), known as "Boss", is a Japanese drift driver.

== Driving career ==
Yamamoto first became a pro driver at the age of 18, racing Honda Civics in the Civic and Mirage race divisions in Japan. He set track records at the Suzuka track in Japan which stood for a number of years.

At the age of 20, Yamamoto opened a tuning shop called Garage-S to focus on the technical side of race tuning, and would later become more widely known after establishing himself in the Japan Drift and tuning scene.

From the mid-1990s onwards, Yamamoto focused his time tuning and racing the SR20DET powered Nissan S13 180SX and Nissan Skyline GTS-t SR20DET or RB20DET powered versions, as well developing his own line of aero body kits and sportswear line.

Yamamoto is currently racing a Toyota Chaser with an OS Giken built KA24DE powered in the 2006 Formula D series. Falken Tires, OS Giken, K&N, Wise Sports, Sparco, Tein, Garage-S and Skye Service SPL are current sponsors.

== Complete Drifting Results ==
Colour	Result
Gold	Winner
Silver	2nd place
Bronze	3rd place
Green	Last 4 [Semi-final]
Blue	Last 8 [Quarter-final]
Purple	Last 16 (16) [1st Tsuiou Round OR Tandem Battle] (Numbers are given to indicate Top 10 finish)
Black	Disqualified (DSQ) (Given to indicate that the driver has been stripped of their position through disqualification)
White	First Round (TAN) [Tansou OR Qualifying Single Runs]
Red	Did not qualify (DNQ)

- When driver's position are highlighted in blue, this indicates either the driver earned 100pt or 100pt tansou (solo run) bonus has been awarded, with the latter being in use for Pre-2005.

=== D1 Grand Prix ===
Year	Entrant	Car	1	2	3	4	5	6	7	Position	Points
2001			EBS	NIK	BHH	EBS	NIK				
2002			BHH	EBS	SGO	TKB	EBS	SEK	NIK		
2003			TKB	BHH	SGO	FUJ	EBS	SEK	TKB		
2004			IRW	SGO	EBS	APS	ODB	EBS	TKB		

=== Formula D ===
Year	Entrant	Car	1	2	3	4	5	6	7	Position	Points
2006			Rd. 1	Rd. 2	Rd. 3	Rd. 4	Rd. 5	Rd. 6	Rd. 7		
2007			Rd. 1	Rd. 2	Rd. 3	Rd. 4	Rd. 5	Rd. 6	Rd. 7		
