= Kazuhiro Tanaka =

Japanese professional drifting driver (born 1970)

- Nationality: Japan
- Born: 4 July 1970 (age 56) Ibaraki

D1 Grand Prix career
- Debut season: 2001
- Current team: Team Orange
- Wins: 2
- Best finish: 8 in 2003, 2004

Kazuhiro Tanaka (田中一弘, Tanaka Kazuhiro; 4 July 1970, Ibaraki) is a Japanese professional drifting driver, currently competing in the D1 Grand Prix series for Team Orange and Yuke’s.

Tanaka entered the D1 Grand Prix in the first round in 2001 and had his first win in 2003. He is a member of Team Orange with Nobushige Kumakubo and Naoto Suenaga.

== Complete Drifting Results ==
Colour	Result
Gold	Winner
Silver	2nd place
Bronze	3rd place
Green	Last 4 [Semi-final]
Blue	Last 8 [Quarter-final]
Purple	Last 16 (16) [1st Tsuiou Round OR Tandem Battle] (Numbers are given to indicate Top 10 finish)
Black	Disqualified (DSQ) (Given to indicate that the driver has been stripped of their position through disqualification)
White	First Round (TAN) [Tansou OR Qualifying Single Runs]
Red	Did not qualify (DNQ)

- When driver's position are highlighted in blue, this indicates either the driver earned 100pt or 100pt tansou (solo run) bonus has been awarded, with the latter being in use for Pre-2005.

=== D1 Grand Prix ===
Year	Entrant	Car	1	2	3	4	5	6	7	8	Position	Points
2001	Rough World	Nissan 180SX	EBS; DNQ	NIK; DNQ	BHH	EBS; TAN	NIK					0
2002	Team Orange	Nissan Silvia S15	BHH	EBS; DNQ	SGO; 2	TKB; TAN	EBS; TAN	SEK; TAN	NIK; TAN		17	18
2003	Team Orange	Nissan Silvia S15	TKB; 3	BHH; 1	SGO; TAN	FUJ; TAN	EBS; 16	SEK; 10	TKB; 16		8	38
2004	Team Orange	Nissan Silvia S15	IRW; 6	SGO; 16	EBS; 7	APS; TAN	ODB; 9	EBS; 6	TKB; TAN		8	32
2005	Team Orange	Nissan Silvia S15	IRW; 13	ODB; 16	SGO; 4	APS; 10	EBS; 10	FUJ; TAN	TKB; TAN		13	20
2006	Team Orange / Yuke's	Subaru Impreza GDB	IRW; 3	SGO; TAN	FUJ; 16	APS; TAN	EBS; 7	SUZ; 6	FUJ; 9	IRW; 1	6	59
2007	Team Orange / Yuke's	Subaru Impreza GDB	EBS; 12	FUJ; TAN	SUZ; 10	SGO; 14	EBS; TAN	APS; DNQ	FUJ; DNQ		22	5
2008	Team Orange / Yuke's	Subaru Impreza GDB	EBS; 3	FUJ; TAN	SUZ; 10	OKY; 9	APS; 5	EBS	FUJ		7	47

== Sources ==
- JDM Option
- D1 Grand Prix
