= 2006 D1 Grand Prix series =

Seasons
- ← 2005 2007 →

In 2006 the D1 Grand Prix championship, a drifting motor racing competition, comprised eight rounds held in Japan and the United States. The overall winner was Nobushige Kumakubo. There was also a D1 Street Legal competition run over seven rounds in Japan, and national competitions in Malaysia and the United Kingdom.

== Changes for the 2006 season ==
- An extra 1 point is now awarded to the driver who manages to earn a perfect score of 100.0 during a 100pt tansou (solo run) round from the judges.
- Jyuri Tamashiro replaces Hatsuno Sugaya as a D1 Gal.
- The D1SL debuts as a full championship season.
- The two national series (D1GB, United Kingdom; and D1MY, Malaysia debuts as full-championship seasons).
- Introduction of four regional D1SL series in Japan, which awards the winners a D1 License.

== 2006 schedules ==
n.b. Winning Driver are mentioned on the right

=== 2006 D1 Grand Prix Point Series ===
Round 1 - March 3/4 - Irwindale Speedway, Irwindale, California, United States - Yasuyuki Kazama (S15)
Round 2 - April 29/30 - Sports Land SUGO, Miyagi Prefecture, Japan - Ken Nomura (ER34)
Round 3 - May 13/14 - Fuji Speedway, Shizuoka Prefecture, Japan - Yasuyuki Kazama (S15)
Round 4 - July 29/30 - Autopolis, Ōita Prefecture, Japan - Ken Nomura (ER34)
Round 5 - August 26/27 - Ebisu South Course, Fukushima Prefecture, Japan - Nobushige Kumakubo (GDB)
Round 6 - September 9/10 - Suzuka Circuit, Mie Prefecture, Japan - Hideo Hiraoka (S15)
Round 7 - October 21/22 - Fuji Speedway, Shizuoka Prefecture, Japan - Masato Kawabata (S15)
Round 8 - December 15/16 - Irwindale Speedway, Irwindale, California, United States - Kazuhiro Tanaka (GDB)

=== 2006 D1 Street Legal Series ===
Round 1 - February 4/5 - Sekia Hills, Kumamoto Prefecture, Japan - Masao Suenaga (FD3S)
Round 2 - April 15/16 - Ebisu South Course, Fukushima Prefecture, Japan - Masao Suenaga (FD3S)
Round 3 - April 29/30 - Sports Land Sugo, Miyagi Prefecture, Japan (D1GP Week) - Toru Inose (S15)
Round 4 - May 13/14 - Fuji Speedway, Shizuoka Prefecture, Japan (D1GP Week) - Hiroyuki Fukushima (PS13)
Round 5 - July 29/30 - Autopolis, Ōita Prefecture, Japan (D1GP Week) - Kazuyoshi Okamura (S15)
Round 6 - August 26/27 - Ebisu, Fukushima Prefecture, Japan (D1GP Week) - Yoshinori Koguchi (JZX100)
Round 7 - November 11/12 - Sekia Hills, Kumamoto Prefecture, Japan - Tetsuya Hibino (S14)

=== Exhibition Rounds ===
Exhibition RD-1 June 17/18 - Silverstone, Silverstone, Northamptonshire, UK - Yasuyuki Kazama (S15)
Exhibition RD-2 July 14/15 - Las Vegas Motor Speedway, Las Vegas, Nevada, United States - Toshiki Yoshioka (AE85)
World All-Star December 17 - Irwindale Speedway, Irwindale, California, United States - Ken Nomura (ER34)

=== Domestic National Series ===
==== UK Series ====
Round 1–28 May - Rockingham Motor Speedway, Northamptonshire - Brett Castle (S14)
Round 2–17 June - Silverstone, Silverstone, Northamptonshire, - Phil Morrison (S14)
Round 3–2 July - Knockhill, Dunfermline, Fife, Scotland - Damien Mulvey (PS13)
Round 4–20 August - Silverstone, Silverstone, Northamptonshire - Mark Luney (BNR32)
Round 5–3 September - Silverstone, Silverstone, Northamptonshire - Ben Broke Smith (HCR32)

==== Malaysia Series ====
Round 1–11 March - Go-Kart track, Shah Alam, Selangor - Zero Lim Kim Ling (A31)
Round 2–22 April - Danga Bay, Johor Bahru - Tengku Djan Ley (AE86)
Round 3–1 July - car park, Shah Alam, Selangor - Tengku Djan Ley (AE86)
Round 4–12 August - Batu Kawan Stadium car park, Batu Kawan, Penang - Tengku Djan Ley (AE86)
Round 5–28 October - Shah Alam, Selangor - Tengku Djan Ley (AE86)

==== New Zealand Driver search ====
Round 1–28 May - Pukekohe Park Raceway, New Zealand - Sean Falconer, Dayna Jury, Jarius Wharerau, Darren McDonald
Round 2–16 September - Powerbuilt Raceway at Ruapuna Park, New Zealand - Adam Richards, Glen Pupich, Phil Taylor, Kahu Campbell

== Championship Results ==
Round 1

Position	Driver	Car	Points
1st	(Japan) Yasuyuki Kazama	Nissan Silvia S15	20
2nd	(Japan) Nobushige Kumakubo	Subaru Impreza GDB	18
3rd	(Japan) Kazuhiro Tanaka	Subaru Impreza GDB	16
4th	(Sweden) Samuel Hubinette	Dodge Viper SRT/10	14
5th	(Japan) Masato Kawabata	Nissan Silvia S15	12
6th	(Japan) Ken Nomura	Nissan Skyline ER34	10
7th	(Japan) Tatsuya Sakuma	Nissan Silvia S15	8
8th	(Japan) Takahiro Ueno	Toyota Soarer JZZ30	6
9th	(Japan) Toshiki Yoshioka	Toyota Sprinter Trueno AE86	4
10th	(United States) Vaughn Gittin Jr.	Ford Mustang GT	2
11th	(Japan) Atsushi Kuroi	Nissan Silvia PS13	1
12th	Youichi Imamura	Nissan Fairlady Z Z33	1
13th	(Japan) Tetsuya Hibino	Toyota Sprinter Trueno AE86	1
14th	(Japan) Hiroshi Fukuda	Nissan 180SX RPS13	1
15th	(Japan) Shuichi Yoshioka	Nissan 180SX RPS13	1
16th	(Japan) Tsuyoshi Tezuka	Nissan Skyline BNR32	2

Round 2

Position	Driver	Car	Points
1st	Ken Nomura	Nissan Skyline ER34	21
2nd	Atsushi Kuroi	Nissan Silvia PS13	18
3rd	Masao Suenaga	Mazda RX-7 FD3S	16
4th	Toshiki Yoshioka	Toyota Sprinter Trueno AE86	15
5th	(Japan) Daigo Saito	Toyota Mark II JZX90	13
6th	Takashi Haruyama	Nissan Laurel C35	10
7th	Masayoshi Tokita	Toyota Soarer MZ12	8
8th	Nobushige Kumakubo	Subaru Impreza GDB	7
9th	Youichi Imamura	Nissan Fairlady Z Z33	5
10th	Takahiro Ueno	Toyota Soarer JZZ30	3
11th	Tatsuya Sakuma	Nissan Silvia S15	1
12th	Tsuyoshi Tezuka	Nissan Skyline BNR32	1
13th	Katsuhiro Ueo	Toyota Sprinter Trueno AE86	1
14th	Naoto Suenaga	Subaru Impreza GC8	1
15th	Yasuyuki Kazama	Nissan Silvia S15	2
16th	Masato Kawabata	Nissan Silvia S15	2

Round 3

Position	Driver	Car	Points
1st	Yasuyuki Kazama	Nissan Silvia S15	20
2nd	Katsuhiro Ueo	Toyota Sprinter Trueno AE86	19
3rd	Nobushige Kumakubo	Subaru Impreza GDB	17
4th	Tatsuya Sakuma	Nissan Silvia S15	15
5th	Wataru Hayashi	Toyota Corolla Levin AE86	12
6th	Masato Kawabata	Nissan Silvia S15	11
7th	Kaoru Yoshikawa	Toyota Chaser JZX100	8
8th	Youichi Imamura	Nissan Fairlady Z Z33	6
9th	Toshiki Yoshioka	Toyota Sprinter Trueno AE86	4
10th	Ken Nomura	Nissan Skyline ER34	2
11th	Kazuhiro Tanaka	Subaru Impreza GDB	1
12th	Hideo Hiraoka	Nissan Silvia S15	2
13th	(Japan) Daigo Saito	Toyota Mark II JZX90	2
14th	Kensaku Komoro	Toyota Sprinter Trueno AE86	2
15th	Tomokazu Hirota	Toyota Verossa JZX110	2
16th	Tsutomu Fujio	Toyota Crown Comfort SXS11Y	2

Round 4

Position	Driver	Car	Points
1st	Ken Nomura	Nissan Skyline ER34	21
2nd	Nobushige Kumakubo	Subaru Impreza GDB	19
3rd	Yasuyuki Kazama	Nissan Silvia S15	16
4th	Katsuhiro Ueo	Toyota Sprinter Trueno AE86	14
5th	Wataru Hayashi	Toyota Corolla Levin AE86	12
6th	Masao Suenaga	Mazda RX-7 FD3S	10
7th	Toshiki Yoshioka	Toyota Sprinter Trueno AE86	8
8th	Tsuyoshi Tezuka	Nissan Skyline BNR32	6
9th	Takashi Haruyama	Nissan Laurel C35	4
10th	Hideo Hiraoka	Nissan Silvia S15	2
11th	(Japan) Daigo Saito	Toyota Mark II JZX90	1
12th	Kensaku Komoro	Toyota Sprinter Trueno AE86	1
13th	Naoto Suenaga	Subaru Impreza GC8	1
14th	Manabu Fujinaka	Mazda RX-7 FD3S	1
15th	Atsushi Kuroi	Nissan Silvia S13	2
16th	Michihiro Takatori	Nissan Skyline ER34	2

Round 5

Position	Driver	Car	Points
1st	Nobushige Kumakubo	Subaru Impreza GDB	20
2nd	Ken Nomura	Nissan Skyline ER34	18
3rd	Hideo Hiraoka	Nissan Silvia S15	17
4th	Masato Kawabata	Nissan Silvia S15	15
5th	Tsuyoshi Tezuka	Nissan Skyline BNR32	12
6th	Masao Suenaga	Mazda RX-7 FD3S	10
7th	Kazuhiro Tanaka	Subaru Impreza GDB	8
8th	Toru Inose	Nissan Silvia S15	6
9th	Katsuhiro Ueo	Toyota Sprinter Trueno AE86	4
10th	Takumi Nozawa	Nissan Silvia S14	2
11th	Takashi Haruyama	Nissan Laurel C35	1
12th	Kenji Takayama	Mazda RX-7 FC3S	1
13th	Tomokazu Hirota	Toyota Verossa JZX110	1
14th	Yasuyuki Kazama	Nissan Silvia S15	2
15th	(Japan) Daigo Saito	Toyota Mark II JZX90	2
16th	Chikara Mizuhata	Nissan Silvia S15	2

Round 6

Position	Driver	Car	Points
1st	Hideo Hiraoka	Nissan Silvia S15	20
2nd	Ken Nomura	Nissan Skyline ER34	19
3rd	Tatsuya Sakuma	Nissan Silvia S15	17
4th	Tetsuya Hibino	Toyota Corolla Levin AE86	15
5th	Toshiki Yoshioka	Toyota Sprinter Trueno AE86	13
6th	Kazuhiro Tanaka	Subaru Impreza GDB	10
7th	Katsuhiro Ueo	Toyota Sprinter Trueno AE86	9
8th	Masato Kawabata	Nissan Silvia S15	7
9th	Kenji Takayama	Mazda RX-7 FC3S	4
10th	Masao Suenaga	Mazda RX-7 FD3S	2
11th	Wataru Hayashi	Toyota Corolla Levin AE86	1
12th	(Japan) Daigo Saito	Toyota Mark II JZX90	1
13th	Toru Inose	Nissan Silvia S15	1
14th	Hiroshi Fukuda	Nissan 180SX RPS13	1
15th	Yasuyuki Kazama	Nissan Silvia S15	2
16th	Atsushi Kuroi	Nissan Silvia PS13	2

Round 7

Position	Driver	Car	Points
1st	Masato Kawabata	Nissan Silvia S15	21
2nd	Tsuyoshi Tezuka	Nissan Skyline BNR32	19
3rd	Toshiki Yoshioka	Toyota Sprinter Trueno AE86	17
4th	Nobushige Kumakubo	Subaru Impreza GDB	15
5th	Kensaku Komoro	Toyota Sprinter Trueno AE86	13
6th	Yasuyuki Kazama	Nissan Silvia S15	11
7th	Tatsuya Sakuma	Nissan Silvia S15	9
8th	Kenji Takayama	Mazda RX-7 FC3S	7
9th	Kazuhiro Tanaka	Subaru Impreza GDB	4
10th	Atsushi Kuroi	Nissan Silvia PS13	2
11th	Takahiro Ueno	Toyota Soarer JZZ30	1
12th	Youichi Imamura	Nissan Fairlady Z Z33	1
13th	Ken Nomura	Nissan Skyline ER34	2
14th	Masao Suenaga	Mazda RX-7 FD3S	2
15th	Wataru Hayashi	Toyota Corolla Levin AE86	2
16th	Ken Maeda	Mazda RX-7 FD3S	2

Round 8

Position	Driver	Car	Points
1st	Kazuhiro Tanaka	Subaru Impreza GDB	20
2nd	Yasuyuki Kazama	Nissan Silvia S15	18
3rd	Ken Nomura	Nissan Skyline ER34	16
4th	Nobushige Kumakubo	Subaru Impreza GDB	14
5th	Darren McNamara	Toyota Corolla GT AE86	12
6th	Masao Suenaga	Mazda RX-7 FD3S	11
7th	Tsuyoshi Tezuka	Nissan Skyline BNR32	9
8th	Youichi Imamura	Nissan Fairlady Z Z33	6
9th	(Japan) Daigo Saito	Toyota Mark II JZX90	5
10th	Tatsuya Sakuma	Nissan Silvia S15	3
11th	Masato Kawabata	Nissan Silvia S15	1
12th	Katsuhiro Ueo	Toyota Sprinter Trueno AE86	1
13th	Wataru Hayashi	Toyota Corolla Levin AE86	1
14th	Atsushi Kuroi	Nissan Silvia PS13	1
15th	(United States) Vaughn Gittin, Jr.	Ford Mustang GT	1
16th	Shuichi Yoshioka	Nissan 180SX RPS13	1

== Final Championship Results ==
=== D1GP ===
Position	Driver	Car	rd.1	rd.2	rd.3	rd.4	rd.5	rd.6	rd.7	rd.8	Total
1st	Nobushige Kumakubo	Subaru Impreza GDB	18	7	17	19	20	-	15	14	110
2nd	Ken Nomura	Nissan Skyline ER34	10	21	2	21	18	19	2	16	109
3rd	Yasuyuki Kazama	Nissan Silvia S15	20	2	20	16	2	2	11	18	91
4th	Masato Kawabata	Nissan Silvia S15	12	2	11	-	15	7	21	1	69
5th	Toshiki Yoshioka	Toyota Sprinter Trueno AE86	4	15	4	8	-	13	17	-	61
6th	Kazuhiro Tanaka	Subaru Impreza GDB	16	-	1	-	8	10	4	20	59
7th	Tatsuya Sakuma	Nissan Silvia S15	8	1	15	-	-	17	9	3	53
8th	Masao Suenaga	Mazda RX-7 FD3S	-	16	-	10	10	2	2	11	51
9th	Tsuyoshi Tezuka	Nissan Skyline BNR32	2	1	-	6	12	-	19	9	49
10th	Katsuhiro Ueo	Toyota Sprinter Trueno AE86/Nissan Fairlady Z Z33	-	1	19	14	4	9	-	1	48
11th	Hideo Hiraoka	Nissan Silvia S15	-	-	2	2	17	20	-	-	41
12th	Wataru Hayashi	Toyota Corolla Levin AE86	-	-	12	12	-	1	2	1	28
13th	Atsushi Kuroi	Nissan Silvia PS13	1	18	-	2	-	2	2	1	26
14th	Daigo Saito	Toyota Mark II JZX90	-	13	2	1	2	1	-	5	24
15th	Youichi Imamura	Nissan Fairlady Z Z33	1	5	6	-	-	-	1	6	19
16th	Tetsuya Hibino	Toyota Corolla Levin AE86	1	-	-	-	-	15	-	-	16
16th	Kensaku Komoro	Toyota Sprinter Trueno AE86	-	-	2	1	-	-	13	-	16
16th	Takashi Haruyama	Nissan Laurel C35	-	10	-	5	1	-	-	-	16
19th	Samuel Hubinette	Dodge Viper SRT/10	14	-	-	-	-	-	-	-	14
20th	Darren McNamara	Toyota Corolla GT AE86	-	-	-	-	-	-	-	12	12
20th	Kenji Takayama	Mazda RX-7 FC3S	-	-	-	-	1	4	7	-	12
22nd	Takahiro Ueno	Toyota Soarer JZZ30	6	3	-	-	-	-	1	-	10
23rd	Masayoshi Tokita	Toyota Soarer MZ12	-	8	-	-	-	-	-	-	8
23rd	Kaoru Yoshikawa	Toyota Chaser JZX100	-	-	8	-	-	-	-	-	8
25th	Toru Inose	Nissan Silvia S15	-	-	-	-	6	1	-	-	7
26th	Vaughn Gittin, Jr.	Ford Mustang GT	2	-	-	-	-	-	-	1	3
26th	Tomokazu Hirota	Toyota Verossa JZX110	-	-	2	-	1	-	-	-	3
28th	Takumi Nozawa	Nissan Silvia S14	-	-	-	-	2	-	-	-	2
28th	Hiroshi Fukuda	Nissan 180SX RPS13	1	-	-	-	-	1	-	-	2
28th	Shuichi Yoshioka	Nissan 180SX RPS13	1	-	-	-	-	-	-	1	2
28th	Naoto Suenaga	Subaru Impreza GC8	-	1	-	1	-	-	-	-	2
28th	Tsutomu Fujio	Toyota Crown Comfort SXS11Y	-	-	2	-	-	-	-	-	2
28th	Michihiro Takatori	Nissan Skyline ER34	-	-	-	2	-	-	-	-	2
28th	Chikara Mizuhata	Nissan Silvia S15	-	-	-	-	2	-	-	-	2
28th	Ken Maeda	Mazda RX-7 FD3S	-	-	-	-	-	-	2	-	2
36th	Manabu Fijinaka	Mazda RX-7 FD3S	-	-	-	1	-	-	-	-	1

- Highlighted in blue - 100pt tansou (solo run) bonus
- Source: D1GP Official Site 2006 Championship table

=== D1SL ===
Position	Driver	Car	rd.1	rd.2	rd.3	rd.4	rd.5	rd.6	rd.7	Total
1st	Takashi Hagisako	Nissan Silvia PS13	12	2	12	-	20	15	14	75
2nd	Masao Suenaga	Mazda RX-7 FD3S	20	20	-	-	6	17	10	73
3rd	Tetsuya Hibino	Toyota Corolla Levin AE86/Nissan Silvia S14	4	8	-	-	15	11	20	58
4th	Kazuyoshi Okamura	Nissan Silvia S15	2	10	16	-	21	8	-	57
5th	Toru Inose	Nissan Silvia S15	-	18	21	2	-	2	12	55
6th	Katsuhiro Ueo	Toyota Corolla Levin AE86/Nissan Silvia S15	1	-	-	16	1	19	8	45
7th	Shiro Deura	Nissan Silvia S14	-	4	18	-	4	-	18	44
8th	Yoshinori Koguchi	Toyota Chaser JZX100	-	-	1	-	-	20	16	37
9th	Kazuya Matsukawa	Nissan 180SX RPS13	16	-	-	-	12	1	6	35
10th	Daigo Saito	Toyota Chaser JZX100	-	1	6	12	10	2	-	31
11th	Yukio Matsui	Toyota Corolla Levin AE86	-	-	14	14	1	-	1	30
12th	Yukiharu Komagata	Nissan Silvia S15	-	1	-	6	16	-	-	23
13th	Takashi Hiyane	Toyota Corolla Levin AE86	18	1	-	-	2	-	1	22
14th	Hiroyuki Fukuyama	Nissan Silvia PS13	-	-	-	20	-	-	-	20
15th	Hideyuki Fujino	Nissan Silvia S15	-	-	-	18	-	-	-	18
15th	Masami Mikami	Nissan Silvia S14	-	16	-	-	-	-	2	18
17th	Takeshi Mogi	Nissan Silvia S14	-	14	-	-	2	1	-	17
17th	Naoto Suenaga	Nissan Silvia PS13	-	12	1	-	-	4	-	17
19th	Yuichi Murakami	Nissan Silvia S14	14	1	-	-	-	-	-	15
19th	Kazuto Ichiyanagi	Nissan 180SX RPS13	1	1	1	10	-	2	-	15
21st	Tomoya Suzuki	Mazda RX-7 FC3S	-	-	-	-	-	13	-	13
22nd	Iwajiro Honma	Nissan Skyline ECR32	-	-	10	1	-	-	-	11
23rd	Akihiko Hirashima	Nissan Silvia PS13	10	-	-	-	-	-	-	10
24th	Junichi Iizuka	Toyota Corolla Levin AE86	-	-	8	-	-	1	-	8
24th	Ken Nomura	Nissan Skyline ER34	2	7	-	-	-	-	-	9
26th	Shigenobu Koga	Nissan Silvia S14	8	-	-	-	-	-	-	8
26th	Ken Maeda	Nissan Silvia PS13	-	-	-	8	-	-	-	8
26th	Seimi Tanaka	Nissan Silvia S14	-	-	-	-	8	-	-	8
29th	Shinichiro Yasukouchi	Toyota Corolla Levin AE86	6	-	-	-	-	-	-	6
29th	Seiichiro Kamata	Mazda RX-7 FD3S	-	-	-	-	-	6	-	6
31st	Yuji Tanaka	Nissan Silvia S14	-	-	4	-	-	-	-	4
31st	Tomohiro Murayama	Toyota Chaser JZX90	-	-	-	4	-	-	-	4
31st	Naoki Nakamura	Nissan Silvia PS13	-	-	-	-	-	-	4	4
34th	Ryo Kategawa	Toyota Chaser JZX90	-	-	-	2	1	-	-	3
35th	Shinji Sagisaka	Toyota Corolla Levin AE86	-	-	2	-	-	-	-	2
35th	Yohei Yamaguchi	Nissan Silvia S14	1	1	-	-	-	-	-	2
35th	Hideyuki Asano	Nissan Silvia PS13	-	-	1	1	-	-	-	2
35th	Kaoru Yoshikawa	Toyota Chaser JZX100	-	-	-	2	-	-	-	2
39th	Masaki Ando	Nissan Silvia S14	1	-	-	-	-	-	-	1
39th	Osamu Yamaguchi	Nissan Silvia S14	1	-	-	-	-	-	-	1
39th	Kosuke Kamiya	Nissan Silvia PS13	-	-	1	-	-	-	-	1
39th	Keiichi Hirono	Nissan 180SX RPS13	-	-	1	-	-	-	-	1
39th	Hideo Tsuchiya	Nissan Silvia S14	-	-	-	1	-	-	-	1
39th	Hirofumi Takada	Nissan Silvia PS13	-	-	-	1	-	-	-	1
39th	Kunihito Sano	Mazda RX-7 FC3S	-	-	-	-	1	-	-	1
39th	Teruaki Shimoda	Nissan Silvia PS13	-	-	-	-	1	-	-	1
39th	Yuichiro Takahashi	Toyota Chaser JZX100	-	-	-	-	-	1	-	1
39th	Hisashi Kamimoto	Nissan Silvia S15	-	-	-	-	-	-	1	1

- Highlighted in blue - 100pt tansou (solo run) bonus
- Source: D1GP Official Site 2006 Championship table

=== D1GB ===
Position	Name	Car Model	Rd.1	Rd.2	Rd.3	Rd.4	Rd.5	Total
1st	Phil Morrison	Nissan 200SXa S14	8	20	16	16	18	78
2nd	Damien Mulvey	Nissan Silvia PS13	12	4	20	18	14	68
3rd	Mark Luney	Nissan Skyline BNR32	18	-	12	20	4	54
4th	Brett Castle	Nissan 200SXa S14	20	14	-	-	16	50
5th	Tim Marshall	Nissan Fairlady Z Z33	14	1	14	1	12	42
6th	Ben Broke Smith	Nissan Skyline HCR32	10	-	10	1	20	41
7th	James Hudson	Nissan Skyline HCR32	1	16	1	4	10	32
8th	Maciej Polody	Nissan 200SXa S14	2	10	4	14	1	31
9th	Steve Evans	Nissan Skyline HCR32	1	-	18	10	1	30
10th	Ralph Crampton	Nissan Fairlady Z Z33	16	1	4	6	1	29
11th	Darren McNamara	Toyota Corolla GT AE86	1	18	-	-	6	25
12th	Paul Vlasblom	BMW M3 E36 Touring	1	12	-	8	2	23
13th	Mark Johnston	Nissan 200SX S13	-	-	-	12	1	13
14th	Tony Green	Toyota Soarer JZZ30	-	-	-	2	8	10
15th	Ian Harrison	Nissan 200SX S13	-	-	8	1	-	9
16th	Glen Maher	Nissan 200SX S13	-	8	-	-	-	8
16th	Niall Gunn	Nissan 200SX S13	-	6	-	1	1	8
18th	Declan Hicks	Toyota Soarer GZ20	6	-	1	-	-	7
19th	Keiran Cameron	Nissan 200SX S13	-	-	6	1	-	6
20th	Mat Steele	Nissan 200SXa S14	2	1	-	-	-	3
20th	Ian Coyne	Nissan 200SX S13	1	2	-	-	-	3
22nd	James Grimsey	Nissan 200SX S13	-	-	1	1	-	2
22nd	Mike Deane	Nissan 200SX S13	1	1	-	-	-	2
22nd	Mark Coyne	Nissan 200SXa S14	-	-	1	-	2	2
25th	Simon Russell	Nissan 200SXa S14	-	-	1	-	-	1
25th	Steven Shine	Nissan 200SX S13	-	-	1	-	-	1
25th	Mike Murphey	Nissan 200SX S13	-	1	-	-	-	1
25th	Mark Buckle	Nissan Skyline HCR32	-	-	1	-	-	1
25th	Scott Armstrong	Datsun Stanza	-	-	1	-	-	1

=== D1MY ===
Position	Name	Car Model	Rd.1	Rd.2	Rd.3	Rd.4	Rd.5	Total
1st	Tengku Djan Ley	Toyota Sprinter Trueno AE86	16	20	20	20		76
2nd	Zero Lim Kim Ling	Nissan Cefiro A31	20	8	16	10		54
3rd	Lim Zee King	Nissan 180SX RPS13	18	4	12	14		48
4th	Jenson Tan	Nissan 180SX RPS13	14	10	8	12		44
5th	Lim Kim Wan	Nissan Cefiro A31	2	12	4	18		36
6th	Ser Meng Hui	Nissan Silvia S15	12	1	2	16		31
7th	Ariff Johanis B. Ahmad	Nissan Skyline BNR32	10	16	1	2		29
8th	Nazrul Afizi b Mohd Nayan	Nissan Cefiro A31	1	-	18	8		27
9th	Ivan Lau Yew Chung	Toyota Corolla KE70	6	6	10	-		22
9th	Tan Tat Wei	Toyota Corolla TE71	-	4	18	-		22
11th	Ng Choon Lai	Nissan Skyline BNR32	-	1	14	4		19
12th	Daniel Lee	Nissan Skyline BNR32	-	14	1	-		15
13th	Kevin Yeoh Kae Harn	Nissan Cefiro A31	1	2	1	8		12
14th	Tee Wee Jin	Nissan 180SX RPS13	8	-	-	-		8
14th	Ivan Lim Sheng Li	Nissan Silvia S15	1	1	-	6		8
16th	Keh Chuan Siew	-	-	-	6	-		6
17th	Jimmy Chia Check Ming	Nissan 180SX RPS13	-	-	1	1		2
18th	Terence Lim Chin Han	Nissan Silvia PS13	1	-	-	-		1
18th	Tay Kong Ho	Toyota Corolla KE70	1	-	-	-		1
18th	Kee Hong Chee	Toyota Sprinter Trueno AE86	1	-	-	-		1
18th	Christ Seck	Nissan 180SX RPS13	-	1	-	-		1
18th	Sean Khoo	Nissan Silvia PS13	-	1	-	-		1
18th	Alvin Lau	Subaru Impreza GDB	-	1	-	-		1
18th	Mohd Haris	Nissan Silvia S14	-	-	1	-		1
18th	Lim Chin Hoong	Toyota Corolla KE70	-	-	1	-		1
18th	Wong Chee Kong	Nissan Cefiro A31	-	-	-	1		1
18th	Haris bin Saidin	Nissan Silvia S14	-	-	-	1		1
18th	Sean Khoo Boon Seong	Nissan Silvia PS13	-	-	-	1		1
18th	Yusuff Shah	Nissan 180SX RPS13	-	-	-	1		1

== See also ==
- D1 Grand Prix
- Drifting (motorsport)

== Sources ==
D1GP Results Database 2006
