= Toshiki Yoshioka =

Japanese professional drifting driver (born 1976)

Yoshioka Toshiki
- Nationality: Japan
- Born: 21 December 1976 (age 49) Hiroshima, Japan

D1 Grand Prix career
- Debut season: 2002, Round 1
- Current team: Team DRoo-P
- Wins: 1
- Fastest laps: (if known)
- Best finish: 5th in 2006

Previous series
- (previous series with line breaks)

Championship titles
- (championship titles)

Toshiki Yoshioka (吉岡稔記, Yoshioka Toshiki; 21 December 1976, Hiroshima) is a Japanese professional drifting driver, currently competing in the D1 Grand Prix series for Team DRoo-P and Yamasa.

Even before he started drifting professionally, Yoshioka always used the Toyota AE86. He first competed in the D1 Grand Prix in the first round of 2002 and has always scored points in every season. He got his first victory in Round 4 of the 2005 season at Autopolis. His Toyota Sprinter Trueno (later switching to Hideo Hiraoka's Corolla Levin AE85 which was converted to an AE86 and a Sprinter Trueno) was normally aspirated and uses nitrous oxide, which led to many collisions. He is known for liking the AE86.

In 2007, he had an average season being best of the AE86 drivers, finishing in eighth place overall. In 2008, he switched from his AE86 to a Lexus SC430, prepared by the renowned tuning garage Tom's.

== Complete Drifting Results ==
Colour	Result
Gold	Winner
Silver	2nd place
Bronze	3rd place
Green	Last 4 [Semi-final]
Blue	Last 8 [Quarter-final]
Purple	Last 16 (16) [1st Tsuiou Round OR Tandem Battle] (Numbers are given to indicate Top 10 finish)
Black	Disqualified (DSQ) (Given to indicate that the driver has been stripped of their position through disqualification)
White	First Round (TAN) [Tansou OR Qualifying Single Runs]
Red	Did not qualify (DNQ)

- When driver's position are highlighted in blue, this indicates either the driver earned 100pt or 100pt tansou (solo run) bonus has been awarded, with the latter being in use for Pre-2005.

=== D1 Grand Prix ===
Year	Entrant	Car	1	2	3	4	5	6	7	8	Position	Points
2002		Toyota Corolla Levin AE86	BHH; 7	EBS; TAN	SGO; DNQ	TKB; 3	EBS; TAN	SEK; TAN	NIK; TAN		12	24
2003		Toyota Corolla Levin AE86	TKB; 16	BHH; 2	SGO; 16	FUJ; 6	EBS; 16	SEK; 4	TKB; 7		6	50
2004	DRoo-P w/ Espelier	Toyota Sprinter Trueno AE86	IRW; 16	SGO; DNQ	EBS; TAN	APS; 2	ODB; 16	EBS; TAN	TKB; 16		13	18
2005	DRoo-P w/ Espelier	Toyota Corolla Levin AE85	IRW; 16	ODB; 7	SGO; DNQ	APS; 1	EBS; 16	FUJ; TAN	TKB; 6		8	40
2006	DRoo-P w/ Espelier	Toyota Corolla Levin AE85	IRW; 9	SGO; 4	FUJ; 9	APS; 7	EBS; TAN	SUZ; 5	FUJ; 3	IRW; TAN	5	61
2007	DRoo-P w/ Yamasa	Toyota Corolla Levin AE85	EBS; 11	FUJ; 14	SUZ; 12	SGO; 8	EBS; 9	APS; 5	FUJ; 5		8	31
2008	DRoo-P w/ Yamasa	Toyota Corolla Levin AE85	EBS; 10	FUJ; 5	SUZ; 3						10	42
2008	DRoo-P w/ Yamasa	Lexus SC430 UZZ40				OKY; TAN	APS; 14	EBS	FUJ		10	42
