= 2017 D1 Grand Prix series =

Motor racing competition

The 2017 D1 Grand Prix series was the seventeenth season for the D1 Grand Prix series. The season began on April 1 at Odaiba Tokyo Street Course and ended on October 8 at the same course, with Hideyuki Fujino winning the D1GP Championship. The D1 Street Legal series did not run this year, and was replaced by the 2018 season with the D1 Lights series.

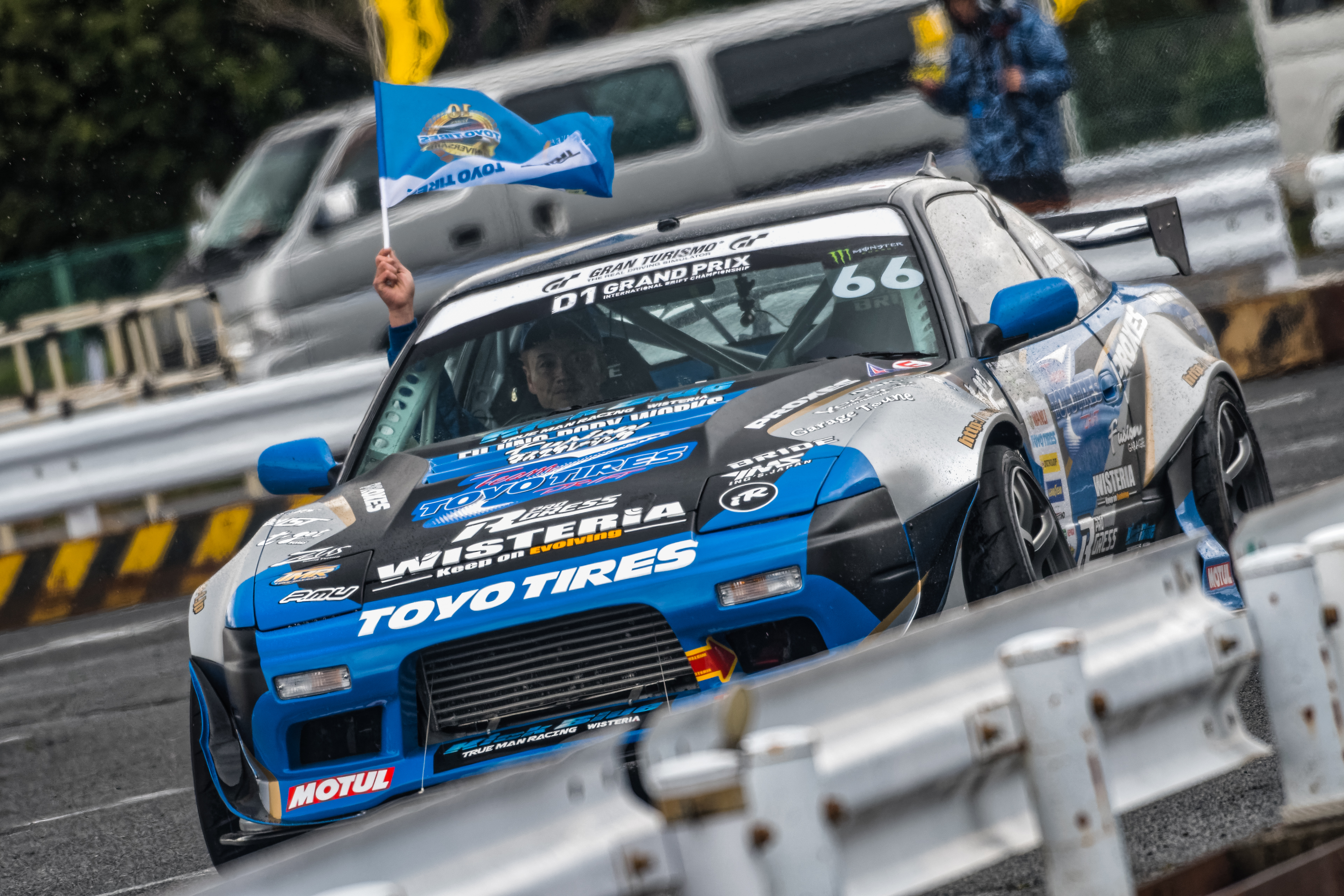
Hideyuki Fujino win his first D1GP championship.

== Teams and drivers ==
=== D1GP ===
Tire	Team	Car	No.	Drivers	Round(s)
Dunlop	Pacific Racing Team	Nissan ER34	3	(Japan) Ken Nomura	1–6
Dunlop	Pacific Racing Team	Nissan S14	14	(Japan) Tomohiro Murayama	1–6
Dunlop	広島トヨタ team DROO-P	Toyota ZN6	33	(Japan) Kazuki Hayashi	1–7
Dunlop	Tanabe Team	Toyota JZX100	38	(Japan) Tadahiro Fukada	1–6
Dunlop	Gator Team-Ryoji	Nissan C33	44	(Japan) Kenji Kiguchi	1–7
Dunlop	OTG	Toyota ZN6	60	(Japan) Youichi Imamura	1–7
Dunlop	広島トヨタ team DROO-P	Toyota AE85	99	(Japan) Kazuya Matsukawa	1–7
Goodride	Team TNR PROSHOP Wave	Nissan S14	16	(Japan) Koji Yamaguchi	1–6
Goodride	BSM Japan Speed Master	Nissan S15	49	(Japan) Hiroyuki Matsuta	1–3
Goodride	Team-Tetsujin OS Giken	Nissan S15	55	(Japan) Kunihiko Teramachi	1–7
Goodride	Stealth Team Red	Nissan S15	58	(Japan) Tachiki Sato	1–3
Goodride	Team Hanpen Wako's	Toyota Verossa	72	(Japan) Kenichi Nakamura	3–6
Goodride	TOPTUL West Auto	Toyota JZX100	73	(Japan) Ikuo Saito	1–6
Goodride	Nichiei Racing	Nissan S15	86	(China) Zhang Shaohua	1–3
Goodride	TCP Magic	Mazda FD3S	88	(Japan) Manabu Fujinaka	1–6
Goodyear	Team Mori	Lexus GRS191	5	(Japan) Kenji Takayama	1–7
Goodyear	Team St.GARAGE	Toyota JZX100	10	(Japan) Hokuto Matsuyama	1–6
Goodyear	AST	Toyota ZN6	28	(Japan) Masayoshi Tokita	3, 5-6
Goodyear	Heart Up World	Lexus GSE20	48	(Japan) Tomoyuki Kitashiba	1–6
Goodyear	Ito Auto	Toyota JZX100	52	(Japan) Yusuke Kitaoka	1–6
Goodyear	Origin Labo.	Nissan RPS13	81	(Japan) Kazuya Bai	1–6
Goodyear	Team Kunny'z	Toyota GRX130	92	(Japan) Kuniaki Takahashi	1–6
Kenda	Team UP GARAGE	Nissan S15	18	(Japan) Kazuya Taguchi	1–7
Kenda	Team Masaki	Nissan S15	37	(Japan) Masaki Kasahara	1–2, 4
Nankang	D-MAX	Nissan S15	70	(Japan) Masashi Yokoi	1–7
Nankang	D-MAX	Nissan S15	75	(Japan) Akira Hirajima	1–7
Toyo	Seimi Style Drift	Nissan S15	2	(Japan) Seimi Tanaka	1–7
Toyo	Dixcel	Nissan S15	6	(Japan) Akinori Utsumi	1–7
Toyo	Team RE雨宮 GruppeM	Mazda FD3S	7	(Japan) Yukio Matsui	1–7
Toyo	Samurai Kanto	Mazda FC3S	21	(Japan) Takahiro Imamura	1–6
Toyo	C.M. Feeling	Nissan S15	23	(Japan) Mitsuru Murakami	4–6
Toyo	Do-Luck	Nissan Z33	32	(Thailand) Daychapon Toyingcharoen	1–6
Toyo	Glion Trust Racing	Nissan R35	35	(Japan) Masato Kawabata	1–7
Toyo	Glion Trust Racing	Nissan R35	39	(Japan) Masao Suenaga	1–7
Toyo	Used Parts Tadokoro	Toyota AE86	43	(Japan) Yoshifumi Tadokoro	1–6
Toyo	Wisteria	Nissan RPS13	66	(Japan) Hideyuki Fujino	1–7
Wanli	Yuke's Team Orange	Nissan S15	9	(Japan) Naoto Suenaga	1–7
Wanli	Bee*Racing	Toyota ZN6	22	(Japan) Tsuyoshi Tezuka	1–7
Wanli	Yuke's Team Orange	Nissan S15	27	(Japan) Masanori Kohashi	1–7
Wanli	TMS Auto Service Mori	Toyota JZX100	36	(Japan) Kazumi Takahashi	1–7
Wanli	Fat Five Racing	Toyota JZX100	45	(Japan) Shingo Hatanaka	1–7
Wanli	Fat Five Racing	Chevrolet C6	87	(Japan) Daigo Saito	1–7
Zestino	Gulf Racing	Honda AP1	8	(Japan) Tetsuya Hibino	1–7
Zestino	Z.S.S. Racing	Nissan S15	15	(Japan) Katsuhiro Ueo	1–4, 7
Zestino	Team TNR PROSHOP Wave	Toyota JZX100	30	(Japan) Tetsuro Nakada	1–6
Zestino	MSR T-Select	Nissan S15	61	(Japan) Masaru Fuchigami	3–4
Zestino	BSM Japan Speed Master	Nissan A31	65	(Japan) Sadaki Okumura	1–2
Zestino	Exedy R Magic D1 Racing	Mazda NA6CE	77	(Japan) Teruyoshi Iwai	1–7
Zestino	Vertex	Toyota JZZ30	78	(Japan) Takahiro Ueno	1–6
N/A	Origin Labo. Sunoco	Nissan S14	12	(Japan) Yoshikazu Kawakami	4

== Schedule ==
2017 D1 Grand Prix race locations

Round	Venue	Date	Tsuiso (dual run) winner	Tanso (solo run) winner	Report
1	Odaiba, Tokyo Prefecture	April 1	(Japan) Hideyuki Fujino	(Japan) Hideyuki Fujino	Report
2	Odaiba, Tokyo Prefecture	April 2	(Japan) Masashi Yokoi	(Japan) Seimi Tanaka	Report
3	Tsukuba Circuit, Ibaraki Prefecture	June 24–25	(Japan) Masato Kawabata	(Japan) Tetsuya Hibino	Report
4	Maishima Sports Island, Osaka Prefecture	July 23–24	(Japan) Hideyuki Fujino	(Japan) Hideyuki Fujino	Report
5	Ebisu Circuit, Fukushima Prefecture	August 19	(Japan) Hideyuki Fujino	(Japan) Hideyuki Fujino	Report
6	Ebisu Circuit, Fukushima Prefecture	August 20	(Japan) Daigo Saito	(Japan) Yukio Matsui	Report
7	Odaiba, Tokyo Prefecture	October 7–8	(Japan) Masashi Yokoi	(Japan) Daigo Saito	Report

== Drivers' rankings ==
=== D1GP ===
Pos.	Driver	Car	Rd.1	Rd.2	Rd.3	Rd.4	Rd.5	Rd.6	Rd.7	Total
1	(Japan) Hideyuki Fujino	Nissan RPS13	30	22	6	17	30	10	22	131
2	(Japan) Masashi Yokoi	Nissan S15	22	30	1	14	12	20	30	128
3	(Japan) Daigo Saito	Chevrolet C6	6		25	22	1	30	25	109
4	(Japan) Akira Hirajima	Nissan S15	20	7	14	20	14	25	14	107
5	(Japan) Masato Kawabata	Nissan R35	17	20	30	8	7	15	16	106
6	(Japan) Naoto Suenaga	Nissan S15	14	1		16	20	16	20	87
7	(Japan) Yukio Matsui	Mazda FD3S	1		11	25	10	17	17	81
8	(Japan) Youichi Imamura	Toyota ZN6	12	17	16	1	22	6	1	74
9	(Japan) Masanori Kohashi	Toyota SXE10	25	1	1	9	25	7	6	73
10	(Japan) Shingo Hatanaka	Toyota JZX100	8		9	15	16	8	8	64
11	(Japan) Masao Suenaga	Nissan R35			22	30	1	1	1	55
12	(Japan) Akinori Utsumi	Nissan S15	1		7	11		22	12	53
13	(Japan) Kazuya Matsukawa	Toyota AE85	5	25	1		15	1	5	52
14	(Japan) Tsuyoshi Tezuka	Toyota ZN6	15	16	8	1	1		9	50
15	(Japan) Seimi Tanaka	Nissan S15	9	12	10	1	1		15	48
16	(Japan) Tetsuya Hibino	Honda AP1	10	11	12	1	1	1	11	46
17	(Japan) Teruyoshi Iwai	Mazda NA6CE	1	8	1	6	11	12	7	45
18	(Japan) Kunihiko Teramachi	Nissan S15		9	15		17		1	42
19	(Japan) Katsuhiro Ueo	Nissan S15	7	10	17	1			1	36
20	(Japan) Kazuya Taguchi	Nissan S15	11	1		10			10	32
21	(Japan) Kenji Kiguchi	Nissan C33	16	1			9	1	1	28
22	(Japan) Kenji Takayama	Lexus GRS191		6	1	7	5	1	1	21
22	(Japan) Kazuki Hayashi	Toyota ZN6			20				1	21
24	(Japan) Kazumi Takahashi	Toyota JZX100	1		5	12	1		1	20
25	(Japan) Yusuke Kitaoka	Toyota JZX100		1				14		15
25	(Japan) Kazuya Bai	Nissan RPS13		14		1				15
25	(Japan) Kuniaki Takahashi	Toyota GRX130		15						15
28	(Japan) Tomohiro Murayama	Nissan S14	1			1	1	11		14
29	(Japan) Takahiro Ueno	Toyota JZZ30	14	1	1					13
30	(Japan) Hokuto Masuyama	Toyota JZX100						9		9
31	(Japan) Kenichi Nakamura	Toyota Verossa					8			8
32	(Japan) Masayoshi Tokita	Toyota ZN6					6	1		7
33	(Japan) Mitsuru Murakami	Nissan S15				5				5
34	(Japan) Ken Nomura	Nissan ER34	1					1		2
34	(Japan) Manabu Fujinaka	Mazda FD3S	1	1						2
36	(Thailand) Daychapon Toyingcharoen	Nissan Z33						1		1
36	(Japan) Ikuo Saito	Toyota JZX100				1				1
36	(Japan) Masaru Fuchigami	Nissan S15			1					1
36	(Japan) Koji Yamaguchi	Nissan S14			1					1
36	(Japan) Yoshifumi Tadokoro	Toyota AE86		1						1
36	(Japan) Tomoyuki Kitashiba	Lexus GSE20		1						1
