= Suenaga =

Suenaga (written: 末永) is a Japanese surname. Notable people with the surname include:

- Haruka Suenaga (末永 遥, born 1986), Japanese actress
- Masao Suenaga (末永 正雄, born 1978), Japanese drifting driver
- Naoto Suenaga (末永 直登, born 1976), Japanese drifting driver
- Yuta Suenaga (末永 雄太, born 1985), Japanese swimmer

Suenaga (written: 季長) is also a masculine Japanese given name. Notable people with the name include:

- Takezaki Suenaga (竹崎 季長, 1246–1314), Japanese samurai
