= 2008 D1 Grand Prix series =

Motor racing competition

Seasons
- ← 2007 2009 →

The 2008 Gran Turismo D1 Grand Prix series was the eighth season for the D1 Grand Prix series and the third for the D1 Street Legal spinoff series. The US series was proposed for a second season in November 2007, but in February 2008, due to commitments, the series was cancelled, leaving the 2007 as the only year the US series ever took place, despite being exhibition rounds. The series began March 29, 2008 for the D1SL and March 30 for D1GP at Ebisu Circuit. The series ended with a non-point scoring World All-Star event held at Irwindale Speedway on November 30, 2008 and concluded altogether on December 14 as a D1SL point scoring round.

== Schedule ==
Round		Venue	Location	Date	Winner	Car
D1GP	D1SL	Venue	Location	Date	Winner	Car
1		(Fukushima Prefecture) Ebisu Circuit	Fukushima Prefecture	March 30	Masato Kawabata	Nissan Silvia S15
	1	(Fukushima Prefecture) Ebisu Circuit	Fukushima Prefecture	April 13	Naoto Suenaga	Nissan Silvia PS13
2		(Shizuoka Prefecture) Fuji Speedway	Shizuoka Prefecture	April 27	Yoshinori Koguchi	Nissan 180SX RSP13
3		(Mie Prefecture) Suzuka Circuit	Mie Prefecture	May 24–25	Tsuyoshi Tezuka	Nissan Skyline BNR32
	2	(Mie Prefecture) Suzuka Circuit	Mie Prefecture	May 24–25	Naoto Suenaga	Nissan Silvia PS13
Tokyo Drift in Odaiba (exhibition)		(Tokyo) Odaiba Metropolitan Car Park	Tokyo Bay	June 7 June 8	Nobushige Kumakubo; Youichi Imamura	Mitsubishi Lancer Evolution IX CT9A; Nissan Silvia S15
4		(Okayama Prefecture) Okayama International Circuit	Okayama Prefecture	June 27–29	Youichi Imamura	Nissan Silvia S15
	3	(Okayama Prefecture) Okayama International Circuit	Okayama Prefecture	June 27–29	Naoki Nakamura	Nissan Silvia S15
5		(Ōita Prefecture) Autopolis	Ōita Prefecture	August 3	Daigo Saito	Toyota Mark II JZX100
6		(Fukushima Prefecture) Ebisu Circuit	Fukushima Prefecture	August 29–31	Nobushige Kumakubo	Mitsubishi Lancer Evolution IX CT9A
	4	(Fukushima Prefecture) Ebisu Circuit	Fukushima Prefecture	August 29–31	Naoto Suenaga	Nissan Silvia PS13
	5	(Niigata Prefecture) Nihonkai Maze Circuit	Niigata Prefecture	September 21	Kiyofumi Jikuya	Nissan Silvia S15
7		(Shizuoka Prefecture) Fuji Speedway	Shizuoka Prefecture	October 26	Masao Suenaga	Mazda RX-7 FD3S
	6	(Kumamoto Prefecture) Sekia Hills	Kumamoto Prefecture	November 16	Naoto Suenaga	Nissan Silvia PS13
World All-Star (non-championship)		(California) Irwindale Speedway	California	November 30	Event Cancelled	Event Cancelled
	7	(Ibaraki Prefecture) Tsukuba Circuit	Ibaraki Prefecture	December 14	Naoto Suenaga	Nissan Silvia PS13

=== Round 1 ===
Position	Driver	Car	Points
1st	Masato Kawabata	Nissan Silvia S15	26
2nd	Ken Nomura	Nissan Skyline ER34	22
3rd	Kazuhiro Tanaka	Subaru Impreza GDB	18
4th	Masao Suenaga	Mazda RX-7 FD3S	17
5th	Takahiro Ueno	Toyota Soarer JZZ30	13
6th	Kuniaki Takahashi	Toyota Chaser JZX100	12
7th	Youichi Imamura	Nissan Silvia S15	11
8th	Tetsuya Hibino	Toyota Corolla Levin AE86	11
9th	Kazuyoshi Okamura	Nissan Silvia S15	9
10th	Toshiki Yoshioka	Toyota Sprinter Trueno AE86	7
11th	Tsuyoshi Tezuka	Nissan Skyline BNR32	7
12th	Nobushige Kumakubo	Mitsubishi Lancer Evolution IX CT9A	5
13th	Masayoshi Tokita	Toyota Crown GRS180	4
14th	Daigo Saito	Toyota Mark II JZX100	3
15th	Hiroshi Fukuda	Nissan 180SX RPS13	2
16th	Drift Samurai	Mazda RX-7 FC3S	1

=== Round 2 ===
Position	Driver	Car	Points
1st	Yoshinori Koguchi	Nissan 180SX RPS13	25
2nd	Daigo Saito	Toyota Mark II JZX100	22
3rd	Tsuyoshi Tezuka	Nissan Skyline BNR32	19
4th	Masao Suenaga	Mazda RX-7 FD3S	17
5th	Toshiki Yoshioka	Toyota Sprinter Trueno AE86	13
6th	Atsushi Kuroi	Nissan Silvia PS13	13
7th	Chikara Mizuhata	Nissan Silvia S15	12
8th	Ken Nomura	Nissan Skyline ER34	10
9th	Nobuteru Taniguchi	Toyota Altezza SXE10	8
10th	Takahiro Ueno	Toyota Soarer JZZ30	8
11th	Hisashi Oginome	Nissan Silvia S15	6
12th	Kazuyoshi Okamura	Nissan Silvia S13	6
13th	Tomokazu Hirota	Toyota Verossa JZX110	4
14th	Youichi Imamura	Nissan Silvia S15	3
15th	Tatsuya Sakuma	Nissan Silvia S15	2
16th	Akinori Utsumi	Nissan Silvia PS13	1

=== Round 3 ===
Position	Driver	Car	Points
1st	Tsuyoshi Tezuka	Nissan Skyline BNR32	26
2nd	Atsushi Kuroi	Nissan Silvia PS13	22
3rd	Toshiki Yoshioka	Toyota Sprinter Trueno AE86	19
4th	Daigo Saito	Toyota Mark II JZX100	17
5th	Youichi Imamura	Nissan Silvia S15	13
6th	Ken Nomura	Nissan Skyline ER34	13
7th	Takahiro Ueno	Toyota Soarer JZZ30	11
8th	Nobushige Kumakubo	Mitsubishi Lancer Evolution IX CT9A	11
9th	Akinori Utsumi	Nissan Silvia PS13	8
10th	Kazuhiro Tanaka	Subaru Impreza GDB	7
11th	Hideo Hiraoka	Subaru Impreza GDB	6
12th	Tatsuya Sakuma	Nissan Silvia S15	5
13th	Masao Suenaga	Mazda RX-7 FD3S	4
14th	Kazuto Ichiyanagi	Nissan Silvia S13	4
15th	Masato Kawabata	Nissan 180SX RPS13	2
16th	Tetsuya Hibino	Toyota Corolla Levin AE86	1

=== Round 4 ===
Position	Driver	Car	Points
1st	Youichi Imamura	Nissan Silvia S15	26
2nd	Tomokazu Hirota	Toyota Verossa JZX110	21
3rd	Tetsuya Hibino	Toyota Corolla Levin AE86	18
4th	Daigo Saito	Toyota Mark II JZX100	17
5th	Masao Suenaga	Mazda RX-7 FD3S	13
6th	Ken Nomura	Nissan Skyline ER34	12
7th	Akinori Utsumi	Nissan Silvia PS13	11
8th	Yoshinori Koguchi	Nissan 180SX RPS13	10
9th	Kazuhiro Tanaka	Subaru Impreza GDB	9
10th	Takahiro Ueno	Toyota Soarer JZZ30	7
11th	Masato Kawabata	Nissan 180SX RPS13	7
12th	Hisashi Oginome	Nissan Silvia S15	5
13th	Chikara Mizuhata	Nissan Silvia S15	4
14th	Masayoshi Tokita	Toyota Crown GRS180	3
15th	Naoki Nakamura	Nissan Silvia S15	2
16th	Nobushige Kumakubo	Mitsubishi Lancer Evolution IX CT9A	2

=== Round 5 ===
Position	Driver	Car	Points
1st	Daigo Saito	Toyota Mark II JZX100	26
2nd	Ken Nomura	Nissan Skyline ER34	21
3rd	Masato Kawabata	Nissan 180SX RPS13	19
4th	Youichi Imamura	Nissan Silvia S15	17
5th	Kazuhiro Tanaka	Subaru Impreza GDB	13
6th	Masao Suenaga	Mazda RX-7 FD3S	13
7th	Kuniaki Takahashi	Toyota Chaser JZX100	11
8th	Nobushige Kumakubo	Mitsubishi Lancer Evolution IX CT9A	10
9th	Atsushi Kuroi	Nissan Silvia PS13	9
10th	Tsuyoshi Tezuka	Nissan Skyline BNR32	8
11th	Toru Inose	Nissan Silvia S15	6
12th	Drift Samurai	Mazda RX-7 FC3S	5
13th	Takahiro Ueno	Toyota Soarer JZZ30	4
14th	Toshiki Yoshioka	Lexus SC430 UZZ40	3
15th	Hideo Hiraoka	Subaru Impreza GDB	2
16th	Yoshinori Koguchi	Nissan 180SX RPS13	1

=== Round 6 ===
Position	Driver	Car	Points
1st	Nobushige Kumakubo	Mitsubishi Lancer Evolution IX CT9A	25
2nd	Youichi Imamura	Nissan Silvia S15	21
3rd	Takahiro Ueno	Toyota Soarer JZZ30	18
4th	Naoki Nakamura	Nissan Silvia S15	16
5th	Tatsuya Sakuma	Nissan Silvia S15	13
6th	Tsuyoshi Tezuka	Nissan Skyline BNR32	12
7th	Daigo Saito	Toyota Mark II JZX100	12
8th	Toshiki Yoshioka	Lexus SC430 UZZ40	10
9th	Kazuyoshi Okamura	Nissan Silvia S15	8
10th	Takumi Nozawa	Nissan Silvia S14	7
11th	Tetsuya Hibino	Toyota Corolla Levin AE86	6
12th	Masato Kawabata	Nissan 180SX RPS13	5
13th	Kazuhiro Tanaka	Subaru Impreza GDB	4
14th	Masashi Yokoi	Nissan Silvia S14	3
15th	Ken Nomura	Nissan Skyline ER34	2
16th	Toru Inose	Nissan Silvia S15	1

=== Round 7 ===
Position	Driver	Car	Points
1st	Masao Suenaga	Mazda RX-7 FD3S	25
2nd	Nobushige Kumakubo	Mitsubishi Lancer Evolution IX CT9A	21
3rd	Masato Kawabata	Nissan 180SX RPS13	19
4th	Daigo Saito	Toyota Mark II JZX100	17
5th	Yoshinori Koguchi	Nissan 180SX RPS13	14
6th	Youichi Imamura	Nissan Silvia S15	13
7th	Takahiro Ueno	Toyota Soarer JZZ30	11
8th	Tetsuya Hibino	Toyota Corolla Levin AE86	10
9th	Drift Samurai	Mazda RX-7 FC3S	8
10th	Tsuyoshi Tezuka	Nissan Skyline BNR32	8
11th	Ken Nomura	Nissan Skyline ER34	7
12th	Tatsuya Sakuma	Nissan Silvia S15	6
13th	Masashi Yokoi	Nissan Silvia S14	4
14th	Junkichi Nagasawa	Nissan Silvia S15	3
15th	Kazuyoshi Okamura	Nissan Silvia S15	2
16th	Toru Inose	Nissan Silvia S15	1

== Final Championship Results ==
=== D1GP ===
Position	Driver	Car	rd.1	rd.2	rd.3	rd.4	rd.5	rd.6	rd.7	Total
1st	Daigo Saito	Toyota Mark II JZX100	3	22	17	17	26	12	17	114
2nd	Youichi Imamura	Nissan Silvia S15	11	3	13	26	17	21	13	104
3rd	Masao Suenaga	Mazda RX-7 FD3S	17	17	4	13	13	0	25	89
4th	Ken Nomura	Nissan Skyline ER34	22	10	13	12	21	2	7	87
5th	Tsuyoshi Tezuka	Nissan Skyline BNR32	7	19	26	0	8	12	8	80
6th	Masato Kawabata	Nissan Silvia S15 / Nissan 180SX RPS13	26	0	2	7	19	5	19	78
7th	Nobushige Kumakubo	Mitsubishi Lancer Evolution IX CT9A	5	0	11	2	10	25	21	74
8th	Takahiro Ueno	Toyota Soarer JZZ30	13	8	11	7	4	18	11	72
9th	Toshiki Yoshioka	Toyota Sprinter Trueno AE86 / Lexus SC430 UZZ40	7	13	19	0	3	10	0	52
10th	Kazuhiro Tanaka	Subaru Impreza GDB	18	0	7	9	13	4	0	51
11th	Yoshinori Koguchi	Nissan 180SX RPS13	0	25	0	10	1	0	14	50
12th	Tetsuya Hibino	Toyota Corolla Levin AE86	11	0	1	18	0	6	10	46
13th	Atsushi Kuroi	Nissan Silvia PS13	0	13	22	0	9	0	0	44
14th	Tatsuya Sakuma	Nissan Silvia S15	0	2	5	0	0	13	6	26
15th	Tomokazu Hirota	Toyota Verossa JZX110	0	4	0	21	0	0	0	25
16th	Kazuyoshi Okamura	Nissan Silvia S15 / Nissan Silvia S13	8	6	0	0	0	8	2	24
17th	Kuniaki Takahashi	Toyota Chaser JZX100	12	0	0	0	11	0	0	23
18th	Akinori Utsumi	Nissan Silvia PS13	0	1	8	11	0	0	0	20
19th	Naoki Nakamura	Nissan Silvia S15	0	0	0	2	0	16	0	18
20th	Chikara Mizuhata	Nissan Silvia S15	0	12	0	4	0	0	0	16
21st	Drift Samurai	Mazda RX-7 FC3S	1	0	0	0	5	0	8	14
22nd	Hisashi Oginome	Nissan Silvia S15	0	6	0	5	0	0	0	11
23rd	Nobuteru Taniguchi	Toyota Altezza SXE10	-	8	-	-	-	-	-	8
23rd	Hideo Hiraoka	Subaru Impreza GDB	0	0	6	0	2	0	0	8
23rd	Toru Inose	Nissan Silvia S15	0	0	0	0	6	1	1	8
26th	Takumi Nozawa	Nissan Silvia S14	-	0	0	0	0	7	0	7
26th	Masayoshi Tokita	Toyota Crown GRS180	4	0	0	3	0	0	0	7
26th	Masashi Yokoi	Nissan Silvia S14	0	0	0	0	0	3	4	7
29th	Kazuto Ichiyanagi	Nissan Silvia PS13	0	0	4	0	0	0	0	4
30th	Junkichi Nagasawa	Nissan Silvia S15	-	0	0	0	0	-	3	3
31st	Hiroshi Fukuda	Nissan 180SX RPS13	2	0	0	0	0	0	0	2

=== D1SL ===
Position	Driver	Car	rd.1	rd.2	rd.3	rd.4	rd.5	rd.6	rd.7	Total
1st	Naoto Suenaga	Nissan Silvia PS13	26	25	7	25	-	26	25	134
2nd	Naoki Nakamura	Nissan Silvia S15	22	9	25	21	6	11	11	105
3rd	Kiyofumi Jikuya	Nissan Silvia S15	12	5	12	11	25	21	10	96
4th	Yukio Matsui	Toyota Supra JZA80	16	18	16	8	12	13	12	95
5th	Hideyuki Fujino	Nissan Silvia S15	7	21	0	7	11	-	11	64
6th	Masashi Yokoi	Nissan Silvia S14	3	4	0	18	16	0	21	62
7th	Tetsuya Hibino	Nissan Silvia S15 / Nissan Silvia PS13	9	7	0	5	21	12	5	59
8th	Takashi Hagisako	Nissan Silvia S13	10	6	2	13	1	10	1	43
8th	Masami Mikami	Nissan Skyline ECR33	0	0	5	16	0	6	16	43
10th	Seimi Tanaka	Nissan Silvia S14	0	0	21	0	7	0	13	41
11th	Kenji Kiguchi	Nissan Laurel C33	18	3	0	4	10	0	0	35
12th	Yukiharu Komagata	Subaru Impreza GDB	13	3	0	-	18	-	-	34
12th	Kyogo Kitayama	Nissan 180SX RPS13	0	16	11	0	0	0	7	34
14th	Hiroshi Fujiki	Nissan 180SX RPS13	0	12	13	1	0	0	7	26
14th	Yuji Tanaka	Nissan Silvia S14	11	0	8	0	0	7	0	26
16th	Hiroyuki Fukuyama	Nissan Silvia PS13	0	0	18	0	4	0	2	24
16th	Tsuyoshi Tezuka	Nissan Skyline ER34	-	-	-	-	-	18	6	24
18th	Katsuhiro Ueo	Nissan Silvia S15	0	11	10	0	-	-	-	21
19th	Iwajiro Honma	Nissan Skyline ECR32	1	13	0	3	0	2	0	19
20th	Tomohiro Murayama	Nissan 180SX RPS13 / Nissan Silvia S14	0	0	1	0	8	-	8	17
21st	Osamu Yamaguchi	Nissan Silvia S14	-	-	-	-	-	16	-	16
21st	Masahiko Mizuno	Nissan Silvia S15	0	10	6	0	0	0	0	16
23rd	Takahiro Yamamoto	Nissan 180SX RPS13	0	0	-	-	13	-	0	13
24th	Daisuke Nakamura	Nissan Silvia S15	0	-	-	12	-	-	0	12
25th	Masami Ochiai	Nissan Silvia S14	0	-	0	10	0	-	0	10
25th	Kinya Nishio	Toyota Mark II JZX110	4	0	0	6	0	-	0	10
27th	Teruaki Shimoda	Nissan Silvia PS13	-	-	-	-	-	8	-	8
28th	Naoya Yamano	Nissan Silvia S15	-	0	4	0	0	-	3	7
29th	Hidenari Izu	Nissan Silvia S15	6	0	-	0	0	-	0	6
30th	Jin Horino	Nissan Silvia S14	5	-	-	0	-	-	-	5
30th	Junichi Iizuka	Nissan Silvia S14	0	-	-	-	5	-	0	5
30th	Ikuo Saito	Nissan 180SX RPS13	-	-	0	-	-	5	-	5
30th	Daisuke Hasegawa	Nissan Silvia S14	0	1	0	0	0	-	4	5
30th	Michinori Ito	Toyota Chaser JZX100	0	-	3	2	0	-	0	5
35th	Akihiko Hirashima	Nissan Silvia S14	-	-	-	-	-	4	0	4
36th	Kazuya Otsuka	Nissan Silvia S15	0	-	-	-	3	-	-	3
36th	Masaaki Ukita	Toyota Corolla Levin AE86	-	-	-	-	-	3	0	3
38th	Shinya Kaneoka	Nissan 180SX RPS13	2	-	-	-	-	-	-	2
38th	Keisuke Ichikawa	Nissan Silvia S14	-	0	-	-	2	-	0	2
40th	Kenji Hanaoka	Nissan Silvia S14	-	-	-	-	-	1	-	1

- Highlighted in blue - 100pt tansou (solo run) bonus
- Source: D1GP Official Site 2008 Championship table

== Sources ==
- (in Japanese)無題ドキュメント (D1GP.co.jp)
