= 2002 D1 Grand Prix series =

Motor racing competition

Seasons
- ← 2001 2003 →

== Changes from the previous season ==
The 2002 season saw various formats with different cutoffs for the tsuisou (twin drift) segment, the ruleset would be finalized in round 4, with tanso (single) runs starting from top 32 and the best scoring 16 drivers advancing to the tsuisou battles.

== 2002 D1 Grand Prix Point Series ==
n.b. Winning Driver are mentioned on the right

Round 1 - February 22/23 - Bihoku Highland Circuit, Okayama Prefecture, Japan - Katsuhiro Ueo (AE86)
Round 2 - April 19/20 - Ebisu South Course, Fukushima Prefecture, Japan - Nobuteru Taniguchi (S15)
Round 3 - May 5/6 - Sports Land SUGO, Miyagi Prefecture, Japan - Masatoshi Asamoto (FD3S)
Round 4 - July 7 - Tsukuba Circuit, Ibaraki Prefecture, Japan - Youichi Imamura (FD3S)
Round 5 - August 13/14 - Ebisu South Course, Fukushima Prefecture, Japan - Kouichi Yamashita (S15)
Round 6 - September 28/29 - Sekia Hills, Kumamoto Prefecture, Japan - Ken Maeda (AE86)
Round 7 - November 11 - Nikkō Circuit, Tochigi Prefecture, Japan - Youichi Imamura (FD3S)

== Final Championship Results ==
Position	Driver	Car	rd.1	rd.2	rd.3	rd.4	rd.5	rd.6	rd.7	Total
1st	Katsuhiro Ueo	Toyota Sprinter Trueno AE86	20	-	4	8	14	18	6	70
2nd	Nobuteru Taniguchi	Nissan Silvia S15	-	20	2	-	16	16	10	64
3rd	Ken Nomura	Nissan Skyline ER34	-	10	16	2	2	10	18	58
4th	Nobushige Kumakubo	Nissan Silvia S15	14	-	12	4	10	14	2	56
5th	Youichi Imamura	Toyota Altezza SXE10/Mazda RX-7 FD3S	-	-	-	20	8	6	20	54
6th	Yuuki Izumida	Nissan Silvia S14	-	-	-	10	8	12	-	40
7th	Gen Terasaki	Toyota Corolla Levin AE86	18	-	-	2	12	2	-	34
7th	Hisashi Kamimoto	Toyota Sprinter Trueno AE86	12	14	-	-	-	8	-	34
7th	Masatoshi Asamoto	Mazda RX-7 FD3S	-	2	20	12	-	-	-	34
10th	Takashi Haruyama	Nissan Cefiro A31	-	-	18	14	-	-	-	32
11th	Hideo Hiraoka	Toyota Chaser JZX100	2	-	6	-	2	4	16	30
12th	Toshiki Yoshioka	Toyota Corolla Levin AE86	8	-	-	16	-	-	-	24
12th	Masao Suenaga	Toyota Corolla Levin AE86	-	-	10	-	-	-	14	24
14th	Tomoyuki Kubo	Toyota Sprinter Trueno AE86	-	-	14	-	-	-	8	22
15th	Ken Maeda	Toyota Sprinter Trueno AE86	-	-	-	-	-	20	-	20
15th	Kouichi Yamashita	Nissan Silvia S15	-	-	-	-	20	-	-	20
17th	Yoshinori Koguchi	Nissan 180SX RPS13	-	-	-	-	6	-	12	18
17th	Kazuhiro Tanaka	Nissan Silvia S15	-	-	-	18	-	-	-	18
17th	Yasuyuki Kazama	Nissan Silvia S15	-	18	-	-	-	-	-	18
20th	Tsuyoshi Tezuka	Toyota Mark II JZX81	10	-	-	6	-	-	-	16
20th	Mitsuru Haruguchi	Mazda RX-7 FC3S	-	16	-	-	-	-	-	16
20th	Hiroshi Fukuda	Nissan 180SX RPS13	16	-	-	-	-	-	-	16
23rd	Yukinobu Okubo	Toyota Corolla Levin AE86	-	8	-	-	4	-	2	14
24th	Takahiro Ueno	Toyota Soarer JZZ30	-	12	-	-	-	-	-	12
25th	Ryota Yuasa	Toyota Corolla Levin AE86/Nissan Laurel C33	6	2	-	-	2	-	-	10
25th	Akinori Utsumi	Nissan Silvia PS13	4	-	-	-	-	2	4	10
27th	Shunichi Tomikuda	Nissan Silvia PS13	-	-	8	-	-	-	-	8
28th	Ryuji Miki	Nissan Silvia S14/Nissan Silvia S15	-	6	-	-	-	-	-	6
29th	Makoto Sezaki	Nissan Silvia S15	-	4	-	-	-	-	-	4
30th	Kusunori Tanaka	Toyota Sprinter Trueno AE86	-	-	-	-	-	2	-	2
30th	Seigo Yamamoto	Toyota Chaser JZX100	-	-	2	-	-	-	-	2
30th	Hiroshi Takahashi	Toyota Sprinter Trueno AE86	-	-	2	-	-	-	-	2
30th	Tatsuya Sakuma	Nissan Silvia PS13	-	2	-	-	-	-	-	2

- Source: D1GP Official Site 2002 Championship table

== See also ==
- D1 Grand Prix
- Drifting (motorsport)

== Sources ==
D1GP Results Database 2000-2004
