= Masao Suenaga =

Japanese professional drifting driver (born 1978)

- Nationality: Japan
- Born: 13 February 1978 (age 48) Kagoshima
- Relatives: Naoto Suenaga

D1 Grand Prix career
- Debut season: 2002
- Former teams: RE Amemiya, TRUST, D-MAX, Clearance
- Wins: 10
- Best finish: 2 in 2005 & 2014

Previous series
- 2006-2007: D1 Street Legal

Masao Suenaga (末永正雄, Suenaga Masao; 13 February 1978, Kagoshima) is a retired Japanese professional drifting driver. He is the younger brother of Naoto who both were taught by Nobushige Kumakubo.

Suenaga began his motorsport career racing minibikes in the Kyūshū area, later winning a title. Following this, his motorcycle racing career ended at the age of 20 caused by injuries. As Naoto was involved in the 'Tono Club' hashiriya group (which one of the members included Katsuhiro Ueo), he also became involved which he was taught how to drift by Naoto. Masao later joined the 'Gowasu?' hashiriya group.

Suenaga has been competing in the D1 Grand Prix series since 2002. In 2002 and 2003, he was the youngest driver to compete in the top 16 and he was soon picked up by RE Amemiya a renowned tuner of rotary powered cars. So he switched from his Nissan Silvia to a Mazda RX-7 (FD3S) went from strength to strength. The Silvia would be driven by Naoto until he became one of the Kumakubo led Team Orange drivers. Masao took his first win in 2005 and went on to place second overall. He had a slight lull in his performance in 2006, but was back on form in 2007 winning twice and finishing the season in third.

Suenaga is one of the few D1GP drivers to compete the spinoff D1 Street Legal series in his own FD RX-7 winning the first two rounds of the inaugural season.

Suenaga competed in the M150 20B-Powered FD3S RX-7 in the inaugural Formula Drift: Asia at Fuji Speedway Japan where he would take first place against Masashi Yokoi.

Suenaga had been with RE Amemiya for years, but left in 2016. In 2017, he was picked up by Toyo Tires GLION TRUST RACING and became teammate of Masato Kawabata. He drove Nissan GT-R (R35).From 2020, he belongs to D-MAX and works with Masashi Yokoi.

Suenaga announced his retirement from professional drifting at 2024 Tokyo Auto Salon due to personal reasons. By the time of his retirement, he have the most D1GP win without winning the championship and he holds record for the fastest time around Tsukuba circuit in D1GP car which he set in 2014.

== Complete Drifting Results ==
Colour	Result
Gold	Winner
Silver	2nd place
Bronze	3rd place
Green	Last 4 [Semi-final]
Blue	Last 8 [Quarter-final]
Purple	Last 16 (16) [1st Tsuiou Round OR Tandem Battle] (Numbers are given to indicate Top 10 finish)
Black	Disqualified (DSQ) (Given to indicate that the driver has been stripped of their position through disqualification)
White	First Round (TAN) [Tansou OR Qualifying Single Runs]
Red	Did not qualify (DNQ)

- When driver's position are highlighted in blue, this indicates either the driver earned 100pt or 100pt tansou (solo run) bonus has been awarded, with the latter being in use for Pre-2005.

=== D1 Grand Prix ===
Year	Entrant	Car	1	2	3	4	5	6	7	8	Position	Points
2002		Toyota Corolla Levin AE86	BHH; TAN	EBS; DNQ	SGO; 6	TKB; 16	EBS; DNQ	SEK; TAN	NIK; 4		12	24
2003		Nissan Silvia PS13	TKB; 16	BHH; 10	SGO; 5	FUJ; 16	EBS; TAN	SEK; 16	TKB; 8		13	20
2004	RE Amemiya	Nissan Silvia S13	IRW; 16								16	14
2004	RE Amemiya	Mazda RX-7 FD3S		SGO; 8	EBS; 16	APS; TAN	ODB; DNQ	EBS; TAN	TKB; 7		16	14
2005	RE Amemiya	Mazda RX-7 FD3S	IRW; 6	ODB; 5	SGO; 6	APS; 3	EBS; 4	FUJ; 1	TKB; 4		2	96
2006	RE Amemiya	Mazda RX-7 FD3S	IRW; TAN	SGO; 3	FUJ; TAN	APS; 6	EBS; 6	SUZ; 10	FUJ; 16	IRW; 6	8	51
2007	RE Amemiya	Mazda RX-7 FD3S	EBS; 3	FUJ; 2	SUZ; 1	SGO; 4	EBS; 11	APS; 13	FUJ; 1		3	92
2008	RE Amemiya	Mazda RX-7 FD3S	EBS; 4	FUJ; 4	SUZ; 13	OKY; 5	APS; 6	EBS; NS	FUJ; 1		3	89
2017	TOYO TIRES GLION TRUST RACING	Nissan R35	ODB; 28	ODB; R	TKB; 3	MSI; 1	EBS; 22	EBS; 22	ODB; 20		11	55

=== D1 Street Legal ===
Year	Entrant	Car	1	2	3	4	5	6	7	Position	Points
2006		Mazda RX-7 FD3S	SEK; 1	EBS; 1	SGO	FUJ	APS	EBS	SEK		
2007		Mazda RX-7 FD3S	SEK	SUZ	SGO	EBS	SEK				

== Sources ==
- D1 Grand Prix
