= Niall Gunn =

Irish racecar driver

Niall Gunn is an Irish racecar driver. Born in Cork, Ireland and he is a professional race driver who specializes in drifting.

Gunn was involved in Motorsport from a very young age. He started off in motocross at 11 years old and Enduros and by 17 years old was the youngest ever Expert Enduro Rider in Ireland at the time. In 2003, he finished third in the Irish Championship before switching efforts to concentrate on the British and European Championship in 2004. He was selected for the Irish Team in 2004 but retired mid-season due to injuries. Gunn also has experience from racing 4 wheel vehicles also and was a Professional Race Instructor at Kartword in Ireland where he also race karts for a season and had some single seater tests. In late 2005, Gunn's interest turned to a new sport called drifting. In 2006 in his first event drift event, he obtained a D1GB license from 2005 D1 Champion Yasuyuki Kazama, 12 other licenses were also given out on what was the first Professional Drift Series in Europe D1GB.

At round 2 at Silverstone, Gunn finished 5th overall in the D1GB event and qualified as the top-eight European drivers to enter D1 Grand Prix Mechanical problems hindered his car on the Sunday.

Gunn finished tenth overall in the series.

In 2007, Gunn competed in the European Drift Championship where he had three top 8 finishes.

In 2008, Gunn concentrated on building the JDM Allstars Invitational series and competed in the Prodrift European series.
