= Nobushige Kumakubo =

Japanese racing driver

- Nationality: Japan
- Born: February 10, 1970 (age 56) Fukushima Prefecture

D1 Grand Prix career
- Debut season: 2001
- Current team: Team Orange
- Wins: 4

Championship titles
- 2006 2012: 2

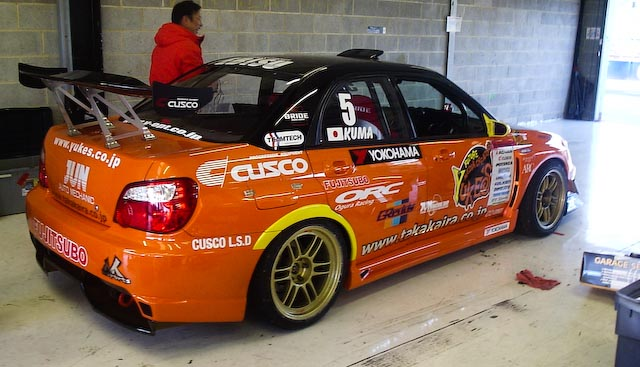
Kumakubo's Team Orange Team Orange en:Subaru Impreza WRX STI GD

Nobushige Kumakubo (熊久保信重, Kumakubo Nobushige; born February 10, 1970, Fukushima Prefecture) is a drifting driver from Japan who competes in the D1 Grand Prix series and racetrack and land owner. Nicknamed Kuma or Shihainin, he is commonly referred to as one of the pioneers of drifting.

== Biography ==
Born to a wealthy family who owned a large portion of land in the Fukushima countryside, with the easy accessibility of the family plot, Kumakubo was able to use some of it to build and develop the Ebisu Circuit.

Kumakubo also used the circuit to host numerous drifting events as well as various motorsport events. As the lead driver of Team Orange, as his car has always been orange, he started at the D1GP series in a Nissan Silvia, in 2005, whilst stumbling through the numerous rallying magazines in his office and considering that the Subaru Impreza was the car to have as many rear wheel drive cars were considered not suitable for drifting or in need of development to be considered suitable, also in a way to bring Impreza owners to his track, Kumakubo commissioned tuning company JUN Auto to build an Impreza WRX STI Impreza, significantly with a radiator on the rear passenger side.

The car debuted at the Odaiba round, unlike others who switched to newer models, his performance would pay off when he was runner up at the Silverstone exhibition round and for the 2006 season, he had beaten Ken Nomura by just 1 point. Midway through the 2007 D1 series Kumakubo switched from the Impreza to an Evo 9 (built also by JUN Auto) during round 5 at Ebisu.

Kumakubo has also built a Mitsubishi Lancer Evolution X in the Team Orange livery which was shown at the Tokyo Auto Salon.

Kumakubo also runs the Big X the invitation only outdoor show that combines drifting, FMX, supermoto, car stunts and other extreme sports featuring the experts from each field.

Big X's drifting squad is called DriftXtreme, which the well known drivers of the D1GP are invited to join including team mate Kazuhiro Tanaka and Naoto Suenaga.

Kumakubo competed in the European Drift Championship during the 2008 season alongside his Team Orange teammate Kazuhiro Tanaka in his Subaru Impreza WRX STI.

== Complete Drifting Results ==
Colour	Result
Gold	Winner
Silver	2nd place
Bronze	3rd place
Green	Last 4 [Semi-final]
Blue	Last 8 [Quarter-final]
Purple	Last 16 (16) [1st Tsuiou Round OR Tandem Battle] (Numbers are given to indicate Top 10 finish)
Black	Disqualified (DSQ) (Given to indicate that the driver has been stripped of their position through disqualification)
White	First Round (TAN) [Tansou OR Qualifying Single Runs]
Red	Did not qualify (DNQ)

- When driver's position are highlighted in blue, this indicates either the driver earned 100pt or 100pt tansou (solo run) bonus has been awarded, with the latter being in use for Pre-2005.

=== D1 Grand Prix ===
Year	Entrant	Car	1	2	3	4	5	6	7	8	Position	Points
2001		Nissan Skyline HCR32	EBS; DNQ	NIK; DNQ	BHH						NC	0
2001		Toyota Chaser JZX100				EBS; TAN	NIK				NC	0
2002	Team Orange	Nissan Silvia S15	BHH; 4	EBS; TAN	EBS; 5	SGO; 9	TKB; 6	SEK; 4	NIK; 10		4th	56
2003	Team Orange	Nissan Silvia S15	TKB; 1	BHH; TAN	SGO; 1	FUJ; TAN	EBS; 5	SEK; 5	TKB; 4		2nd	78
2004	Team Orange / Ebisu Circuit	Nissan Silvia S15	IRW; 4	SGO; 5	EBS; 5	APS; 16	ODB; 16	EBS; 9	TKB; 2		6th	60
2005	Team Orange / Yuke's	Nissan Silvia S15	IRW; 4								4th	55
2005	Team Orange / Yuke's	Subaru Impreza GDB		ODB; TAN	SGO; 10	APS; 6	EBS; 11	FUJ; 5	TKB; 3		4th	55
2006	Team Orange / Yuke's	Subaru Impreza GDB	IRW; 2	SGO; 8	FUJ; 3	APS; 2	EBS; 1	SUZ; TAN	FUJ; 4	IRW; 4	1st	110
2007	Team Orange / Yuke's	Subaru Impreza GDB	EBS; 1	FUJ; 3	SUZ; 4	SGO; 2					2nd	99
2007	Team Orange / Yuke's	Mitsubishi Lancer Evo IX CT9A					EBS; 8	APS; 8	FUJ; 3		2nd	99
2008	Team Orange / Yuke's	Mitsubishi Lancer Evo IX CT9A	EBS; 12	FUJ; TAN	SUZ; 8	OKY; 16	APS; 8	EBS	FUJ		13th	28
2008	Team Orange / Yuke's	Mitsubishi Lancer Evo X									13th	28

Preceded by Yasuyuki Kazama	D1 Grand Prix Champion; 2006	Succeeded by Masato Kawabata
