= 2003 D1 Grand Prix series =

Motor racing competition

Seasons
- ← 2002 2004 →

== 2003 Schedules ==
n.b. Winning Driver are mentioned on the right

=== 2003 D1 Grand Prix Point Series ===
Round 1 - February 2 - Tsukuba Circuit, Ibaraki Prefecture, Japan - Nobushige Kumakubo (S15)
Round 2 - March 8/9 - Bihoku Highland Circuit, Okayama Prefecture, Japan - Kazuhiro Tanaka (S15)
Round 3 - April 19/20 - Sports Land SUGO, Miyagi Prefecture, Japan - Nobushige Kumakubo (S15)
Round 4 - July 6 - Fuji Speedway, Shizuoka Prefecture, Japan - Youichi Imamura (FD3S)
Round 5 - August 9/10 - Ebisu South Course, Fukushima Prefecture, Japan - Youichi Imamura (FD3S)
Round 6 - October 4/5 - Sekia Hills, Kumamoto Prefecture, Japan - Katsuhiro Ueo (AE85)
Round 7 - November 26/27 - Tsukuba Circuit, Ibaraki Prefecture, Japan - Nobuteru Taniguchi (S15)

=== 2003 D1 Grand Prix Exhibition Matches ===
D1 US Exhibition - August 31 - Irwindale Speedway, Irwindale, California, United States - Katsuhiro Ueo (AE86)

== Final Championship Results ==
| Position | Driver | Car | rd.1 | rd.2 | rd.3 | rd.4 | rd.5 | rd.6 | rd.7 | Total |
|---|---|---|---|---|---|---|---|---|---|---|
| 1st | Youichi Imamura | Mazda RX-7 FD3S | 14 | 16 | 18 | 20 | 20 | - | 18 | 106 |
| 2nd | Nobushige Kumakubo | Nissan Silvia S15 | 20 | - | 20 | - | 12 | 12 | 14 | 78 |
| 3rd | Katsuhiro Ueo | Toyota Sprinter Trueno AE86/Toyota Sprinter Trueno AE85 | 8 | | 16 | 12 | 14 | 20 | - | 70 |
| 4th | Nobuteru Taniguchi | Nissan Silvia S15 | - | - | - | 18 | 10 | 16 | 20 | 64 |
| 5th | Gen Terasaki | Toyota Corolla Levin AE86 | 12 | 8 | 6 | 14 | - | - | 16 | 56 |
| 6th | Toshiki Yoshioka | Toyota Corolla Levin AE86 | - | 18 | - | 10 | - | 14 | 8 | 50 |
| 7th | Ken Nomura | Nissan Skyline ER34 | 10 | 14 | 4 | - | 6 | 10 | - | 44 |
| 8th | Kazuhiro Tanaka | Nissan Silvia S15 | 16 | 20 | - | - | - | 2 | - | 38 |
| 9th | Masatoshi Asamoto | Mazda RX-7 FD3S | 18 | - | - | - | - | 18 | - | 36 |
| 10th | Hiroshi Fukuda | Nissan 180SX RPS13 | - | - | - | - | 16 | 6 | 12 | 34 |
| 11th | Hisashi Kamimoto | Toyota Corolla Levin AE86 | 6 | - | - | - | 8 | 8 | 10 | 32 |
| 12th | Yasuyuki Kazama | Nissan Silvia S15 | - | - | 2 | 6 | 18 | - | - | 26 |
| 13th | Ryuji Miki | Nissan Silvia S15 | - | 12 | - | - | - | 4 | 4 | 20 |
| 13th | Masao Suenaga | Nissan Silvia PS13 | - | 2 | 12 | - | - | - | 6 | 20 |
| 15th | Kuniaki Takahashi | Toyota Chaser JZX100 | 2 | - | - | 16 | - | - | - | 18 |
| 16th | Akinori Utsumi | Nissan Silvia PS13/Nissan Silvia S15 | - | - | 14 | - | - | - | - | 14 |
| 17th | Noritsugu Totani | Nissan Laurel C33 | - | - | 10 | 2 | - | - | - | 12 |
| 18th | Toshimasa Maruta | Nissan Silvia PS13 | - | 10 | - | - | - | - | - | 10 |
| 19th | Mitsuru Haruguchi | Mazda RX-7 FC3S/Toyota Corolla Levin AE86 | - | - | 8 | - | - | - | - | 8 |
| 19th | Tsuyoshi Tezuka | Toyota Mark II JZX81 | - | - | - | 8 | - | - | - | 8 |
| 21st | Yoshifumi Tadokoro | Toyota Sprinter Trueno AE86 | - | 6 | - | - | - | - | - | 6 |
| 22nd | Masayoshi Tokita | Toyota Soarer GZ10 | - | - | - | 2 | 2 | - | - | 4 |
| 22nd | Yoshinori Koguchi | Nissan 180SX RPS13 | - | - | - | - | -4 | - | - | 4 |
| 22nd | Tetsuya Saito | Nissan Cefiro A31 | - | - | - | -4 | - | - | - | 4 |
| 22nd | Takahiro Ueno | Toyota Soarer JZZ30 | 4 | - | - | - | - | - | - | 4 |
| 22nd | Michihiro Takatori | Nissan Cefiro A31 | - | 4 | - | - | - | - | - | 4 |
| 27th | Shunichi Tomikuda | Nissan Silvia PS13 | - | - | 2 | - | - | - | - | '2 |
| 27th | Shingo Murao | Mazda RX-7 FC3S | - | - | - | 2 | - | - | - | 2 |
| 27th | Makoto Sezaki | Nissan Silvia S15 | - | - | - | - | 2 | - | - | 2 |
| 27th | Wataru Hayashi | Toyota Corolla Levin AE86 | - | - | - | - | - | - | 2 | 2 |
| 27th | Yukinobu Okubo | Toyota Corolla Levin AE86 | - | - | - | - | - | 2 | - | 2 |

- Source: D1GP Official Site 2003 Championship table

== See also ==
- D1 Grand Prix
- Drifting (motorsport)

== Sources ==
D1GP Results Database 2000-2004
