= Naoto Suenaga =

Japanese professional drifting driver

- Nationality: Japan
- Born: 23 July 1976 (age 50) Kagoshima, Japan
- Relatives: Masao Suenaga
- Debut season: 2004
- Former teams: Team Orange (D1GP), Kazama Auto (FDJ)
- Wins: 4
- Best finish: 2nd in 2013

Previous series
- D1 Street Legal; Formula Drift Japan; Russian Drift Series

Championship titles
- 2008: D1 Street Legal

Naoto Suenaga (末永直登, Suenaga Naoto; born 23 July 1976, Kagoshima Prefecture) is a retired Japanese professional drifting driver and the older brother of D1 Grand Prix driver Masao Suenaga. He is known for competing in the D1 Grand Prix series for Team ORANGE. In addition to competitions, he teaches a drift school and formerly works for Ebisu Circuit.

Suenaga is the 2008 D1 Street Legal champion, setting a record 5 win in a season.

== Complete Drifting Results ==
Colour	Result
Gold	Winner
Silver	2nd place
Bronze	3rd place
Green	Last 4 [Semi-final]
Blue	Last 8 [Quarter-final]
Purple	Last 16 (16) [1st Tsuiou Round OR Tandem Battle] (Numbers are given to indicate Top 10 finish)
Black	Disqualified (DSQ) (Given to indicate that the driver has been stripped of their position through disqualification)
White	First Round (TAN) [Tansou OR Qualifying Single Runs]
Red	Did not qualify (DNQ)

- When driver's position are highlighted in blue, this indicates either the driver earned 100pt or 100pt tansou (solo run) bonus has been awarded, with the latter being in use for Pre-2005.

=== D1 Grand Prix ===
Year	Entrant	Car	1	2	3	4	5	6	7	8	Position	Points
2005		Nissan PS13	IRW; DNQ	ODB; 16	SGO; TAN	APS; DNQ	EBS; 6	FUJ; DNQ	TKB; DNQ	⇨	19	11
2006	Team Orange	Subaru GC8	IRW; TAN	SGO; 16	FUJ; DNQ	APS; 16	EBS; TAN	SUZ; TAN	FUJ; TAN	IRW	28	2
2007	Team Orange	Subaru GC8	EBS; 16	FUJ; 11	SUZ; R	SGO; TAN	EBS; TAN	APS; DNQ	FUJ; DNQ	⇨	27	3
2008	Team Orange	Subaru GC8	EBS; T-20	FUJ; Q-27	SUZ; Q-32	OKY; Q-24	APS; Q-22	EBS; Q-28	FUJ; Q38	⇨	-	0
2009	Team Orange	Mitsubishi CT9A	EBS; 12	APS; T-26	OKY; T-27	OKY; T-25	EBS; Q-42	EBS; Q-31	FUJ; Q-21	FUJ; Q-30	28	5
2010	YUKE'S CUSCO TEAM ORANGE with ADVAN	Mitsubishi CT9A	EBS; T-25	APS; T-17	OKY; T-28	OKY; 12	EBS; 6	EBS; 3	FUJ; T-19	⇨	13	36
2011	YUKE'S TEAM ORANGE with BEAST EYE	Mitsubishi CT9A	ODB; 8	ODB; 10	APS; 10	SUZ; 18	OKY; 9	EBS; 13	EBS; 11	FUJ; 13	11	100
2012	YUKE'S TEAM ORANGE with BEAST EYE	Mitsubishi CZ4A	ODB; 24	SUZ; Q-17	APS; 12	EBS; 1	EBS; 13	CSC; 14	ODB; 1	⇨	8	67
2013	YUKE'S TEAM ORANGE with BEAST EYE	Nissan S15	MSI; 22	SUZ; 1	EBS; 3	EBS; 4	HBR; 9	ODB; 3	⇨		2	92
2014	YUKE'S TEAM ORANGE	Nissan S15	FUJ; 5	SUZ; 7	APS; 14	EBS; 16	EBS; 15	ODB; 12	⇨		9	78
2015	YUKE'S TEAM ORANGE	Nissan S15	ODB; 3	SUZ; 3	EBS; 16	TKB; 13	MSI; 4	ODB; 15	⇨		5	113
2016	YUKE'S Team ORANGE	Nissan S15	ODB; 11	FUJ; 9	TKB; R	TKB; R	EBS; 7	EBS; 8	ODB; 20	⇨	9	52
2017	YUKE'S Team ORANGE	Nissan S15	ODB; 8	ODB; Q-22	TKB; Q-17	MSI; 6	EBS; 4	EBS; 6	ODB; 4	⇨	6	87
2018	YUKE'S Team ORANGE	Nissan S15	MSI; 10	MSI; 6	APS; 2	TOK; 2	TKB; 3	EBS; DSQ	EBS; 14	ODB; 9	3	118

== Sources ==
- D1 Grand Prix
- Suenaga's D1 Profile
