= 2004 D1 Grand Prix series =

Motor racing competition

Seasons
- ← 2003 2005 →

== Changes for the 2004 Season ==
- Autobacs becomes title sponsor.
- Introduction of the D1 Gals who would appear at each event. Previously to that, the series used girls who were represented by other sponsors.
- Cars are now required to bear the D1GP sponsor box, containing the series' sponsors logos, at the side of the car at each event.
- Cars are now required to bear the D1GP orange sun visor, containing the series logo and the company logo, at each event.

== 2004 Schedules ==
n.b. Winning Driver are mentioned on the right

=== 2004 D1 Grand Prix Point Series ===
Round 1 - February 27/28 - Irwindale Speedway, Irwindale, California, United States - Yasuyuki Kazama (S15)
Round 2 - May 4/5 - Sports Land SUGO (Go-Kart circuit), Miyagi Prefecture, Japan - Yasuyuki Kazama (S15)
Round 3 - July 24/25 - Ebisu South Course, Fukushima Prefecture, Japan - Ken Nomura (ER34)
Round 4 - August 21/22 - Autopolis, Ōita Prefecture, Japan - Nobuteru Taniguchi (S15)
Round 5 - September 18 - Metropolitan Parking, Odaiba, Japan - Ryuji Miki (S15)
Round 6 - October 23/24 - Ebisu South Course, Fukushima Prefecture, Japan - Youichi Imamura (FD3S)
Round 7 - November 25 - Tsukuba Circuit, Ibaraki Prefecture, Japan - Youichi Imamura (FD3S)

=== 2004 D1 Grand Prix Exhibition Matches ===
D1 Pre-Season Match - January 17 - Metropolitan Parking, Odaiba, Japan - Kuniaki Takahashi (JZX100)
D1 Exhibition - Apr. 17 - Metropolitan Parking, Odaiba, Japan - Ken Nomura (ER34)
D1 Odaiba Allstar Match - Apr. 18 - Metropolitan Parking, Odaiba, Japan - Yasuyuki Kazama (S15)
D1 Odaiba Allstar Match - Sep. 19 - Metropolitan Parking, Odaiba, Japan - Youichi Imamura (FD3S)
D1 USA vs Japan Allstar - December 17 - California Speedway, Fontana, California, United States - Nobushige Kumakubo (S15)

== Final Championship Results ==
| Position | Driver | Car | rd.1 | rd.2 | rd.3 | rd.4 | rd.5 | rd.6 | rd.7 | Total |
|---|---|---|---|---|---|---|---|---|---|---|
| 1st | Ryuji Miki | Nissan Silvia S15 | 12 | 14 | 14 | 16 | 20 | 18 | 16 | 110 |
| 2nd | Nobuteru Taniguchi | Nissan Silvia S15/Toyota Altezza SXE10 | 18 | 18 | 16 | 20 | 10 | - | - | 82 |
| 3rd | Youichi Imamura | Mazda RX-7 FD3S | - | 10 | 10 | - | 18 | 20 | 20 | 78 |
| 4th | Yasuyuki Kazama | Nissan Silvia S15 | 20 | 20 | 6 | 14 | 6 | - | 6 | 72 |
| 4th | Ken Nomura | Nissan Skyline ER34 | 16 | 16 | 20 | 6 | 8 | 6 | - | 72 |
| 6th | Nobushige Kumakubo | Nissan Silvia S15 | 14 | 12 | 12 | - | - | 4 | 18 | 60 |
| 7th | Ken Maeda | Toyota Sprinter Trueno AE86 | - | - | - | 12 | 16 | 14 | - | 42 |
| 8th | Kazuhiro Tanaka | Nissan Silvia S15 | 10 | - | 8 | - | 4 | 10 | - | 32 |
| 9th | Tetsuya Hibino | Toyota Corolla Levin AE86 | - | - | 18 | - | - | 12 | - | 30 |
| 10th | Toyohisa Matsuda | Toyota Corolla Levin AE86 | - | - | - | - | 12 | - | 10 | 22 |
| 11th | Hideo Hiraoka | Toyota Sprinter Trueno AE86 | - | 4 | - | 2 | - | - | 14 | 20 |
| 11th | Takahiro Ueno | Toyota Soarer JZZ30 | - | 8 | - | - | - | - | 12 | 20 |
| 13th | Toshiki Yoshioka | Toyota Corolla Levin/Sprinter Trueno AE86 | - | - | - | 18 | - | - | - | 18 |
| 13th | Drift Samurai | Mazda RX-7 FC3S | - | - | - | 2 | - | 16 | - | 18 |
| 15th | Akinori Utsumi | Mazda RX-7 FD3S | - | 2 | - | - | 14 | - | - | 16 |
| 16th | Atsushi Kuroi | Nissan Silvia PS13 | 8 | - | 4 | - | - | - | 2 | 14 |
| 16th | Masao Suenaga | Mazda RX-7 FD3S | - | 6 | - | - | - | - | 8 | 14 |
| 18th | Kazunari Hayashida | Nissan Silvia S15 | - | - | - | 10 | - | 2 | - | 12 |
| 19th | Shinichi Yamada | Toyota Corolla Levin AE86/Nissan Silvia S15 | - | - | - | - | - | 8 | - | 8 |
| 19th | Shunichi Tomikuda | Nissan Silvia PS13 | - | - | - | 8 | - | - | - | 8 |
| 21st | Gen Terasaki | Toyota Corolla Levin AE86 | 4 | - | 2 | - | - | - | - | 6 |
| 21st | Hisashi Kamimoto | Nissan Silvia S15 | 6 | - | - | - | - | - | - | 6 |
| 23rd | Masato Kawabata | Nissan Silvia S15 | - | - | - | 4 | - | - | - | 4 |
| 23rd | Hiroshi Fukuda | Nissan 180SX RPS13 | 2 | - | - | - | 2 | - | - | 4 |
| 23rd | Kuniaki Takahashi | Toyota Chaser JZX100 | - | - | - | - | - | - | 4 | 4 |
| 26th | Samuel Hubinette | Toyota Supra JZA80 | 2 | - | - | - | - | - | - | 2 |

- Source: D1GP Official Site 2004 Championship table

== See also ==
- D1 Grand Prix
- Drifting (motorsport)

== Sources ==
- D1GP Results Database 2000-2004
