= 2001 D1 Grand Prix series =

Motor racing competition

Seasons
- ← none 2002 →

2001 D1 Grand Prix Point Series

n.b. Winning Driver are mentioned on the right

Round 1 - October 6, 2000 - Ebisu Circuit South Course, Fukushima Prefecture, Japan - Youichi Imamura (AE86)
Round 2 - February 16, 2001 - Nikkō Circuit, Tochigi Prefecture, Japan - Nobuteru Taniguchi (S15)
Round 3 - May 29, 2001 - Bihoku Highland Circuit, Hiroshima Prefecture, Japan - Mitsuru Haruguchi (FC3S)
Round 4 - August 12, 2001 - Ebisu Circuit South Course, Fukushima Prefecture, Japan - Takahiro Ueno (JZZ30)
Round 5 - November 29, 2001 - Nikkō Circuit, Tochigi Prefecture, Japan - Nobuteru Taniguchi (S15)

== Final Championship Results ==
Position	Driver	Car	rd.1	rd.2	rd.3	rd.4	rd.5	Total
1st	Nobuteru Taniguchi	Nissan Silvia S15	14	20	-	14	20	68
2nd	Youichi Imamura	Toyota Sprinter Trueno AE86	20	10	6	12	18	66
3rd	Takahiro Ueno	Toyota Soarer JZZ30	18	14	-	20	-	52
4th	Hisashi Kamimoto	Toyota Corolla Levin AE86	-	-	18	16	16	50
5th	Ken Maeda	Toyota Corolla Levin AE86	-	-	14	8	10	32
5th	Mitsuru Haruguchi	Mazda RX-7 FC3S	-	12	20	-	-	32
7th	Ryota Yuasa	Toyota Corolla Levin AE86	-	-	8	6	14	28
8th	Katsuhiro Ueo	Toyota Sprinter Trueno AE86	-	-	16	-	8	24
8th	Makoto Sezaki	Nissan Silvia PS13	12	-	-	-	12	24
10th	Toru Maruyama	Toyota Sprinter Trueno AE86	10	-	12	-	-	22
11th	Yasuyuki Kazama	Nissan Silvia S15	4	16	-	-	-	20
11th	Tsuyoshi Tezuka	Toyota Mark II JZX81	16	-	4	-	-	20
13th	Hideo Hiraoka	Nissan 180SX RPS13	-	-	-	18	-	18
13th	Yasushi Wakamatsu	Nissan 180SX RPS13	-	18	-	-	-	18
15th	Teruaki Itai	Nissan 180SX RPS13	8	6	-	-	-	14
16th	Yoshinori Koguchi	Nissan 180SX RPS13	6	-	-	-	6	12
17th	Hideto Tao	Toyota Sprinter Trueno AE86	-	-	10	-	-	10
17th	Hiroshi Takahashi	Toyota Sprinter Trueno AE86	-	-	-	10	-	10
19th	Toru Inose	Mazda RX-7 FC3S	-	4	-	-	4	8
19th	Shunichi Tomikuda	Toyota Carina TA63	-	8	-	-	-	8
21st	Ryuji Miki	Nissan Silvia S14	-	-	2	-	2	4
21st	Shoji Nakazawa	Toyota Corolla Levin AE86	-	-	-	4	-	4
23rd	Hisashi Oginome	Nissan 180SX RPS13	-	-	-	2	-	2
23rd	Takayuki Matsui	Nissan Silvia S14	-	2	-	-	-	2
23rd	Chikara Mizuhata	Nissan Silvia S14	2	-	-	-	-	2

- Source: D1GP Official Site 2001 Championship table

== See also ==
- D1 Grand Prix
- Drifting (motorsport)

== Sources ==
D1GP Results Database 2000-2004
