= Toyota AE85 =

Toyota Corolla Levin; Sprinter Trueno (AE85)
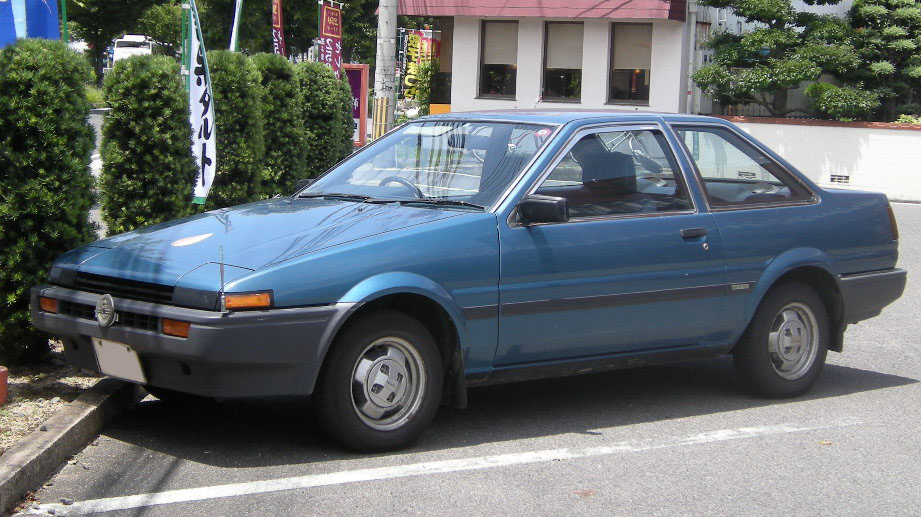
- 1983–1985 Toyota Sprinter Trueno SE (Japan)

Overview
- Manufacturer: Toyota
- Model code: AE85
- Production: May 1983–April 1987
- Assembly: Japan: Toyota City (Takaoka plant); Higashi-Fuji plant, Susono, Shizuoka (Kanto Auto Works)

Body and chassis
- Class: Subcompact car
- Body style: 2-door coupé; 3-door liftback
- Layout: Front-engine, rear-wheel drive
- Platform: E70
- Related: Toyota AE86; Toyota Corolla (E70); Toyota Sprinter (E70); Daihatsu Charmant (A55/60)

Powertrain
- Engine: 1.5 L 3A-U I4
- Power output: 83–85 PS (82–84 bhp; 61–63 kW); 117 N⋅m (86 lb⋅ft; 12 kg⋅m) (gross)
- Transmission: K50 5-speed manual; A42DL 4-speed automatic

Dimensions
- Wheelbase: 2,400 mm (94 in)
- Length: Corolla Levin: 4,185 mm (165 in) (1983–1985); 4,200 mm (165 in) (1985–1987); Sprinter Trueno: 4,205 mm (166 in) (1983–1985); 4,215 mm (166 in) (1985–1987)
- Width: 1,625 mm (64.0 in)
- Height: 1,335 mm (52.6 in)
- Curb weight: 855–910 kg (1,885–2,006 lb)

Chronology
- Predecessor: Toyota Corolla/Sprinter SR coupé (AE70)
- Successor: Toyota Corolla Levin Zi/Sprinter Trueno Xi (AE91)

The AE85 series of the Toyota Corolla Levin/Sprinter Trueno are small, front-engine/rear-wheel-drive compact cars within the mostly front-engine/front-wheel-drive fifth-generation Corolla (E80) range —manufactured by Toyota from 1983 to 1987 in coupé and liftback configurations.

The AE85 shares its chassis and basic design with the AE86, however the AE85 was designed for economy and mainly differs in its engine, whereas the AE86 was designed for performance. It was only sold in Japan and was not sold in North America or other regions. The leading characters in the VIN do not always use the same characters as the chassis code, so some less powerful variants of the AE86 (with the 1.6 L 4A engine) were sold there with an AE86 chassis code on the build plate in the engine bay but with AE85 in the VIN.

== Name ==
The car is known colloquially in Japan as the Hachi-Go (ハチゴー), meaning "Eight-Five". The word "trueno" is Spanish for thunder, and "levin" is Old English for "lightning". The Corolla Levin was sold at Toyota Corolla Store locations, whereas the Sprinter Trueno was sold at Toyota Auto Store locations.

The chassis code "AE85" is used to describe the 1500 cc RWD model from the range. In classic Toyota code, the "A" represents the engine that came in the car (3A series), "E" represents the Corolla, "8" represents the fifth generation (E80 series) and "5" represents the variation within this generation.

Pre-facelift models from 1983 to 1985 were known as "zenki" (前期, lit. early period), while the facelift 1985–1987 models were known as "kouki" (後期, lit. latter period).

== Engine/technical ==
The AE85 was available with a carburetor-equipped 3A-U 1,452 cc (1.5 L; 88.6 cu in) inline-four engine, an SOHC (Single overhead cam) two-valve-per-cylinder motor, which at the time was nothing new; the previous fourth generation Toyota Corollas and Sprinters such as the AE70 featured the same engine. Toyota opted to use the older, less powerful engine in the AE85 to keep costs down, while still providing enough power for an economy-class car. This decision led the AE85 to be outclassed in horsepower by not only the stronger AE86, but most other options at the time. However, it was rated by the Japanese Ministry of Transport to have a fuel economy of 26.4 km/L (62.1 mi/gal) when running at a constant speed of 60 km/h (37.28 mph) which was drastically better than most other cars of its class.

The AE85 featured solid disc brakes on the front and drum brakes on the back, rack and pinion steering, and a K50 cable-clutch manual transmission (an optional automatic transmission was available). It did not incorporate a limited-slip differential (LSD) or ventilated disc brakes in the front and rear of the higher-performing AE86.

== Body styles ==
The AE85 and AE86 was available in multiple body variations and trim levels, with the Levin and Trueno featuring fixed-headlights and retractable pop-up headlights respectively. Because of their identical outward appearance, these variants can sometimes be mistaken. All AE85 variants have 1.5 L engines, and are nearly identical in form to their 1.6 L counterparts found in the AE86. The AE85 (as well as the AE86) was rear-wheel drive, built on the revised E70 Corolla platform (same wheelbase length, interchangeable parts, etc.), unlike the front wheel drive E80 models in the same range.

=== Model variations ===
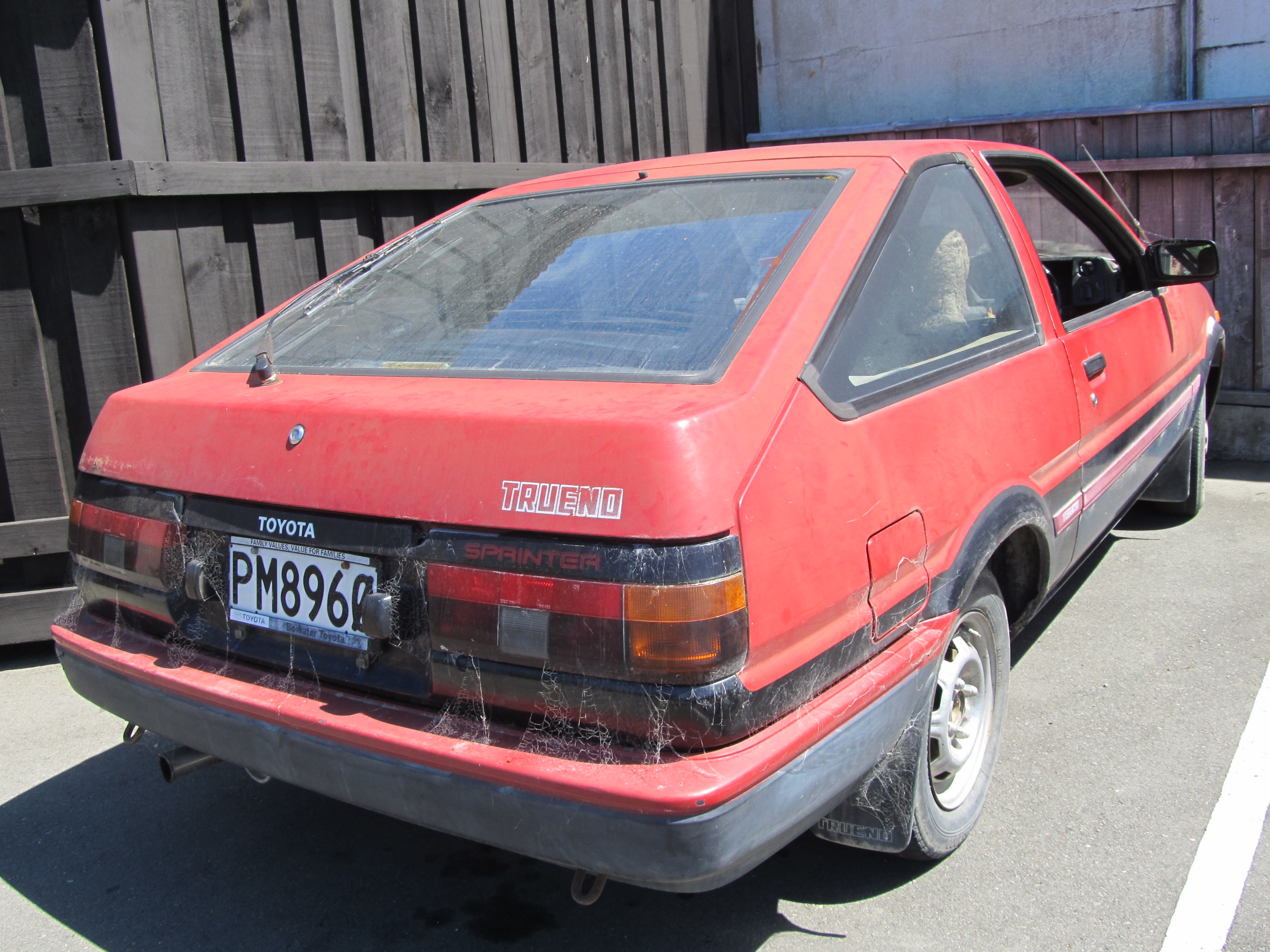
1983–1985 AE85 Sprinter Trueno SR liftback

==== SR and SE ====
The AE85 SR and SE came in both Levin or Trueno versions, the former being a 3-door liftback intended for motorsports, and the latter being the 2-door coupé with more equipment.

==== XL-Lissé and GL-Lime ====
The Lissé and Lime were luxury variants of the XL and GL models respectively, marketed heavily towards women in Japan. They featured an automatic transmission (with the option for a factory manual) and power steering as standard, and had unique upholstery in the interior. The Lissé is a 2-door Trueno, and the Lime is a 2-door Levin.

==== XL and GL ====
Both of these models were low grade versions that were less expensive. The XL model is a 2-door Trueno, and the GL is a 2-door Levin.

== Differences between the AE85 and AE86 ==
While both the AE85 and AE86 are nearly identical in terms of exterior, several differences set the AE85 apart from the sportier and more upmarket AE86. The engines themselves are the most obvious differences, however there are more differences that are shown in the list below.

=== Mechanical ===
- The engine is a 1.5 L SOHC 3A-U, which is less powerful than the 1.6 L DOHC 4A-GE/GEC/GEU or SOHC 4A/4A-C engines that the AE86 had.
- The manual transmission of the AE85 is a K50 transmission with cable clutch, also featured on the previous generation E70 Corolla/Sprinter. On the other hand, the manual transmission of the AE86 is a T50 transmission with hydraulic clutch. The AE85 also shared the same A42DL automatic transmission as the export AE86 DX/SR/SR-5.
- The AE85 uses differentials coded S302 (manual, 3.727) and S312 (automatic, 3.909), the same as those used by the regular E70 Corolla/Sprinter. The SOHC AE86 uses S292 and S314 (4.100 and 3.909 ratio) differentials, while the DOHC models were equipped with T282 (4.300 ratio) non-LSD for both transmissions or optional T283 LSD.
- The AE85 uses solid front disc brakes, while the AE86 is equipped with ventilated disc brakes. It does not use the rear disc brakes the AE86 had, and in their place are drum brakes (which were also used on the AE86 GT).
- The AE85 uses a one-piece drive shaft while the AE86 uses a two-piece drive shaft.
- The AE85 did not have a rear suspension stabilizer bar, except for the SR liftbacks.

=== Exterior ===
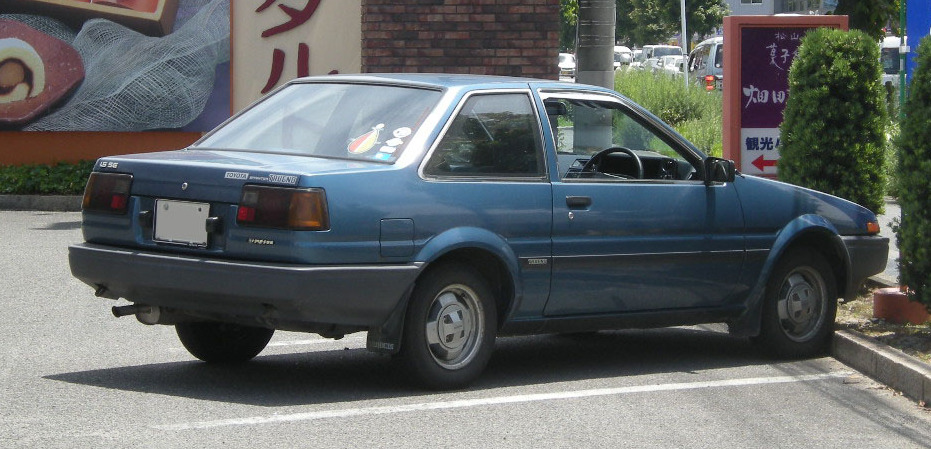
1983–1985 AE85 Sprinter Trueno SE coupé

- Like the AE86 models, the AE85 has badges denoting the trim level of the model. Among those are GL, GL-Lime, XL, XL-Lissé, SE or SR. In comparison, the AE86 has GT, GT-V or GT-Apex for the Japanese market, DX, SR-5 or GT-S for the North American market, and GT or SR for the rest of the world.
- Every AE85 models shared the same 13-inch alloy wheels as the AE86 GT. For the facelifted model, hubcaps were added as standard for GL-Lime and XL-Lissé trims.
- On the SE coupé, the B pillars are painted as the same colour of the car and the window mouldings are chrome. The body coloured B-pillar was added to other AE85 coupés in the 1985 facelift.
- The facelifted models of the Sprinter Trueno AE85 did not come with cornering lamps as standard, as what had happened with the facelifted Sprinter Trueno AE86. In its place were non-illuminating orange inserts, filling in the slots where the cornering lamps normally go.
- The GL-Lime and XL-Lissé can be recognized by the long horizontal decals on the side of the body. The "Trueno/Levin" badge on the moulding between door and rear wheel arch were also replaced by "Lime/Lissé".

=== Interior ===
- The instrument cluster of the SR and SE models is identical to that of the AE86, except that the redline on the tachometer is set at 6,000 rpm. The North American DX/SR-5, European/general export SR and Australian Sprinter liftback AE86 (with the SOHC engine) uses the same redline. The AE86 (with the DOHC engines) has a 7,600 rpm redline. The GL, XL, GL-Lime and XL-Lissé models use a basic instrument cluster that does not have a tachometer.
- Instead of the sport seats found on the AE86, the AE85 used basic bucket seats. The SR, XL and GL models had seats with small headrests (the export markets DX/SR/SR-5 AE86 used these seats), while the SE, XL-Lissé and GL-Lime models had seats with large headrests (also used in the AE86 GT). The facelifted Levin SR liftback model received the same redesigned sport seats from the facelifted AE86 models. The GL, GL-Lime, XL and XL-Lissé also did not have 50:50 rear bench seat, same as the Japanese AE86 GT and US DX coupé.
- At least three different steering wheel designs were used during the lifespan of the AE85. Two designs of a two-spoke steering wheel similar to the non-GT trim of the E80 Corollas/Sprinters as well as on the AE86 GT were used on most models, while a three-spoke steering wheel similar to that found in the AE86 GT-V/GT-Apex and AE82 Corolla GT/FX-GT was used for the facelifted Corolla Levin SR liftback.
- The center console for GL, GL-Lime, XL and XL-Lissé is shorter, similar to the Japanese GT, GT-V and US DX AE86.

== The AE85 in motorsports ==
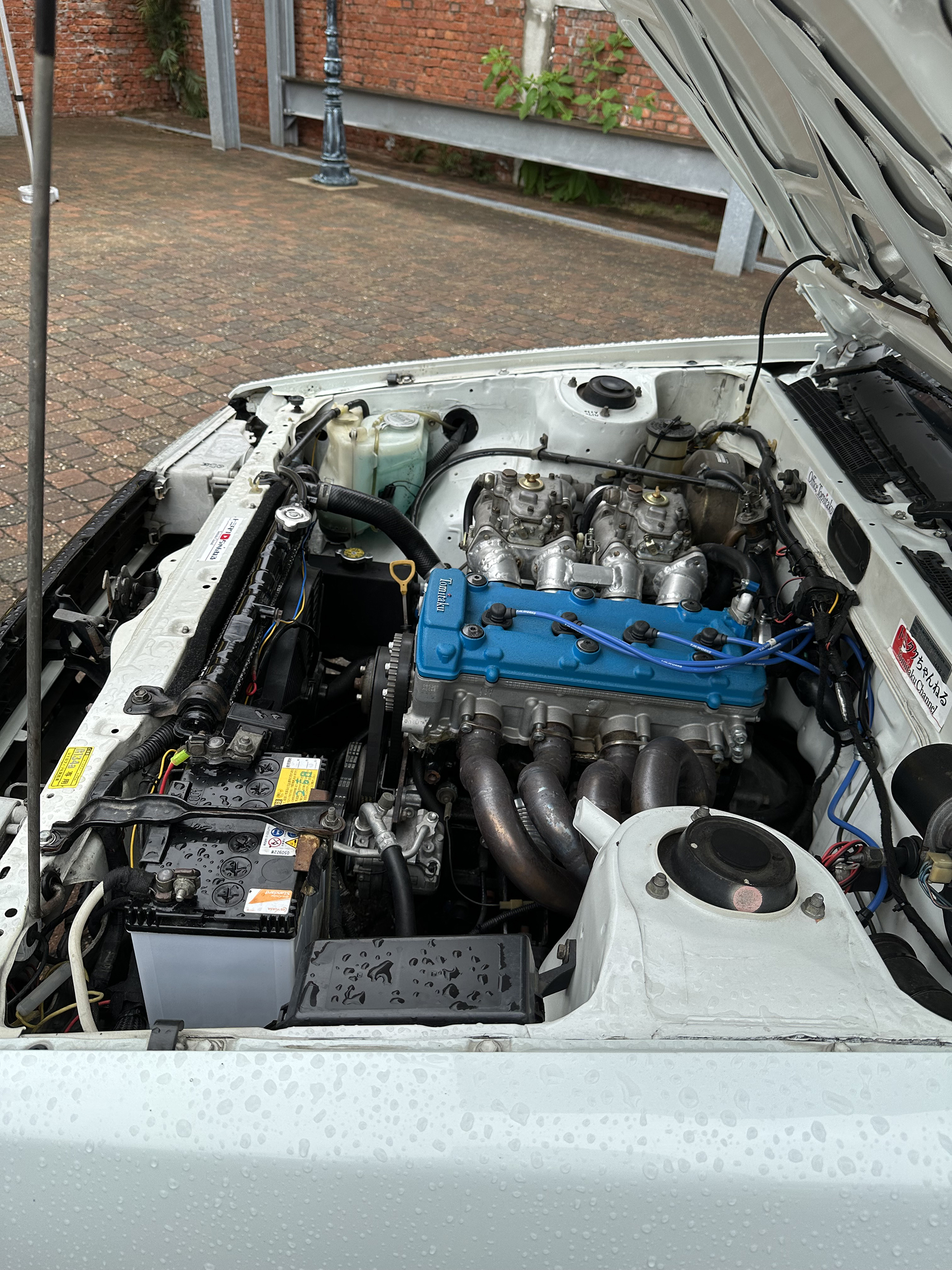
An example of a modified AE85 with a Suzuki Hayabusa DOHC cylinder head and twin Weber carburetors developed by Tomitaku.

Privateer racing teams in Japan would take an AE85 and convert it to an AE86 since it is much cheaper by performing an engine swap. Using modifications such as a bolt-on turbocharger or supercharger, racers can strengthen their vehicle while keeping the light weight of the AE85 body.

== In popular culture ==
In the Initial D anime and manga, side character and Takumi Fujiwara's friend, Itsuki Takeuchi, mistakenly purchases an AE85 Levin SR liftback thinking it was an AE86 Levin GT-APEX liftback, which led to him being initially ridiculed by his co-workers (except for Takumi) and several other street racers in the process. Itsuki would then later put a turbocharger in his AE85 for more power, testing it out on the touge (mountain pass).

== Production ==
The Toyota AE85 (as well as the AE86) was built in either the Kanto Higashi-Fuji plant, or the Takaoka plant. 79,036 units of the AE85 were produced from May 1983 to April 1987.

AE85s built at the Takaoka plant came with a "0" designation at the beginning of the serial number. Their plant codes were "A51" and "A54". 38,642 of the AE85 were produced at this plant. This was the original plant where the Toyota Corolla and Sprinter were manufactured.

AE85s built at the (now-closed) Kanto Higashi-Fuji plant came with a "5" designation at the beginning of the serial number. Their plant codes were "M21" and "M22". 40,394 units were produced in this plant.

The AE85 was never exported; all exports were of the AE86.
