= Ebisu Circuit =

Motorsport racing complex in Japan

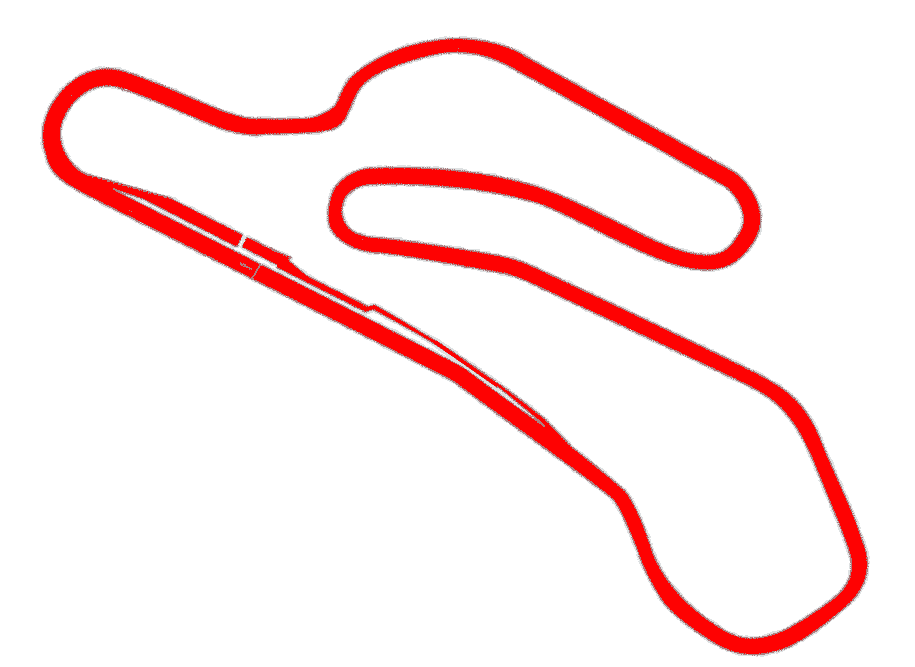
- East Course at the Ebisu Circuit
- Location: 1 Sawamatsukura, Nihonmatsu, Fukushima Prefecture, Japan
- Coordinates: 37°38′39″N 140°22′20″E
- Owner: Nobushige Kumakubo
- Opened: 1986
- Major events: D1 Grand Prix, Formula Drift Japan, drifting, karting, motorcycling, FJ1600
- Website: http://www.ebisu-circuit.com/

East Course (main)
- Surface: Asphalt
- Length: 2.061 km (1.281 miles)
- Turns: 16

West Course
- Length: 2.103 km (1.307 miles)
- Turns: 21

South Course
- Length: 1.200 km (0.746 miles)

North Course
- Length: 1.155 km (0.718 miles)

New Touge Course
- Length: 1.500 km (0.932 miles)

Ebisu Circuit (エビスサーキット) is a motorsport racing complex located in Nihonmatsu, Fukushima Prefecture, Japan.

== Overview ==
The Ebisu Circuit complex has seven individual tracks and two skid pad type circuits. The circuits are Nishi (West), Kita (North), Higashi (East), Minami (South) as well as Drift Land, the School Course, The Touge (mountain pass) and 'KuruKuru Land' which are the skidpads. The most famous circuit is the Minami or South course which is used for D1 Grand Prix and other drifting events. The Higashi or East circuit features a 420-meter-long main straight with 20 ground-floor pit garages and is used mainly for grip events.

Ebisu Circuit was designed and built by the drift driver Nobushige Kumakubo and is one of the premier drifting-based race tracks in the world. Nobushige also holds other non-drifting motorsport events at Ebisu including motorcycle races, karting, endurance races, FJ1600 open-wheel car races and, in previous years, events like "Big-X". The complex also has a safari park.

In February 2021, the circuit suffered significant damage due to a landslide caused by the 2021 Fukushima earthquake.
