= 2010 D1 Grand Prix series =

Racing series

Seasons
- ← 2009 2011 →

The 2010 Gran Turismo D1 Grand Prix series was the tenth anniversary season for the D1 Grand Prix series and the fifth for the D1 Street Legal spinoff series. The series began March 27, 2010 at Odaiba Parking in Tokyo for the D1GP and April 17 for D1SL at Bihoku Highland Circuit. The series concluded altogether on October 17 as a D1GP Exhibition match at Fuji Speedway.

== Schedule ==
Round		Venue	Location	Date	Winner	Car
D1GP	D1SL	Venue	Location	Date	Winner	Car
1		(Tokyo) Odaiba	Tokyo Prefecture	March 27	Youichi Imamura	Nissan Silvia S15
D1GP All Star Show		(Tokyo) Odaiba	Tokyo Prefecture	March 28	Youichi Imamura	Nissan Silvia S15
	1	(Hiroshima Prefecture) Bihoku Highland Circuit	Hiroshima Prefecture	April 17, 18	Kiyofumi Jikuya	Nissan Silvia S15
2		(Ōita Prefecture) Autopolis	Ōita Prefecture	April 24, 25	Masao Suenaga	Mazda RX-7 FD3S
	2	(Fukushima Prefecture) Ebisu Circuit	Fukushima Prefecture	May 8, 9	Tsuyoshi Tezuka	Nissan Skyline ER34
3		(Shizuoka Prefecture) Fuji Speedway	Shizuoka Prefecture	June 5, 6	Youichi Imamura	Nissan Silvia S15
4		(Okayama Prefecture) Okayama International Circuit	Okayama Prefecture	June 26, 27	Masayoshi Tokita	Toyota Crown GRS180
	3	(Mie Prefecture) Suzuka Twin Circuit	Mie Prefecture	July 10, 11	Naoki Nakamura	Nissan Silvia PS13
5		(Fukushima Prefecture) Ebisu Circuit	Fukushima Prefecture	August 7	Tetsuya Hibino	Toyota Sprinter Trueno AE86
6		(Fukushima Prefecture) Ebisu Circuit	Fukushima Prefecture	August 8	Youichi Imamura	Nissan Silvia S15
	4	(Fukushima Prefecture) Ebisu Circuit	Fukushima Prefecture	September 4, 5		
	5	(Niigata Prefecture) Nihonkai Maze Circuit	Niigata Prefecture	September 25, 26		
	6	(Tochigi Prefecture) Nikkō Circuit	Tochigi Prefecture	October 9, 10		
7		(Shizuoka Prefecture) Fuji Speedway	Shizuoka Prefecture	October 16	Masato Kawabata	Nissan 180SX RPS13
D1GP Exhibition		(Shizuoka Prefecture) Fuji Speedway	Shizuoka Prefecture	October 17	Ken Nomura	Nissan Skyline ER34

== Results ==
=== Round 1 ===
Position	Driver	Car	Points
1st	Youichi Imamura	Nissan Silvia S15	25
2nd	Tetsuya Hibino	Toyota Sprinter Trueno AE86	21
3rd	Masato Kawabata	Nissan 180SX RPS13	19
4th	Masao Suenaga	Mazda RX-7 FD3S	16
5th	Kenji Takayama	Mazda RX-7 FD3S	13
6th	Yoshinori Koguchi	Nissan 180SX RPS13	12
7th	Ken Nomura	Nissan Skyline ER34	11
8th	Manabu Orido	Toyota Supra JZA80	10
9th	Nobushige Kumakubo	Mitsubishi Lancer Evolution X CZ4A	8
10th	Samuel Hubinette	Toyota Soarer JZZ30	7
11th	Masayoshi Tokita	Toyota Crown GRS180	6
12th	Tsuyoshi Tezuka	Nissan Skyline GT-R BNR32	5
13th	Akinori Utsumi	Nissan Silvia PS13	4
14th	Yoshifumi Tadokoro	Toyota Sprinter Trueno AE86	3
15th	Kuniaki Takahashi	Toyota Chaser JZX100	2
16th	Kazuya Matsukawa	Lexus SC430 UZZ40	1

=== Round 2 ===
Position	Driver	Car	Points
1st	Masao Suenaga	Mazda RX-7 FD3S	25
2nd	Daigo Saito	Toyota Mark II JZX100	21
3rd	Yoshinori Koguchi	Nissan 180SX RPS13	18
4th	Ken Nomura	Nissan Skyline ER34	16
5th	Youichi Imamura	Nissan Silvia S15	13
6th	Tetsuya Hibino	Toyota Sprinter Trueno AE86	12
7th	Kuniaki Takahashi	Toyota Chaser JZX100	11
8th	Masayoshi Tokita	Toyota Crown GRS180	10
9th	Masato Kawabata	Nissan 180SX RPS13	8
10th	Naoki Nakamura	Nissan Silvia S15	7
11th	Chikara Mizuhata	Nissan Silvia S15	6
12th	Toru Inose	Nissan Silvia S15	5
13th	Tatsuya Sakuma	Nissan Silvia S15	4
14th	Nobushige Kumakubo	Mitsubishi Lancer Evolution X CZ4A	3
15th	Kenji Takayama	Mazda RX-7 FD3S	2
16th	Hiroshi Fukuda	Nissan Silvia S15	1

=== Round 3 ===
Position	Driver	Car	Points
1st	Youichi Imamura	Nissan Silvia S15	25
2nd	Ken Nomura	Nissan Skyline ER34	21
3rd	Masato Kawabata	Nissan 180SX RPS13	18
4th	Masao Suenaga	Mazda RX-7 FD3S	16
5th	Tatsuya Sakuma	Nissan Silvia S15	13
6th	Manabu Orido	Toyota Supra JZA80	12
7th	Daigo Saito	Toyota Mark II JZX100	12
8th	Manabu Fujinaka	Mazda RX-7 FD3S	10
9th	Kuniaki Takahashi	Toyota Chaser JZX100	8
10th	Kenji Takayama	Mazda RX-7 FD3S	7
11th	Masayoshi Tokita	Toyota Crown GRS180	6
12th	Yoshinori Koguchi	Nissan 180SX RPS13	5
13th	Takahiro Imamura	Mazda RX-7 FC3S	4
14th	Shinji Minowa	Toyota Mark II JZX90	3
15th	Chikara Mizuhata	Nissan Silvia S15	2
16th	Tetsuya Hibino	Toyota Sprinter Trueno AE86	1

=== Round 4 ===
Position	Driver	Car	Points
1st	Masayoshi Tokita	Toyota Crown GRS180	25
2nd	Manabu Orido	Toyota Supra JZA80	22
3rd	Youichi Imamura	Nissan Silvia S15	18
4th	Naoki Nakamura	Nissan Silvia S15	16
5th	Tatsuya Sakuma	Nissan Silvia S15	13
6th	Kenji Takayama	Mazda RX-7 FD3S	12
7th	Masato Kawabata	Nissan 180SX RPS13	11
8th	Chikara Mizuhata	Nissan Silvia S15	10
9th	Ken Nomura	Nissan Skyline ER34	8
10th	Tomokazu Hirota	Lexus GS350 GRS191	7
11th	Yoshinori Koguchi	Nissan 180SX RPS13	6
12th	Naoto Suenaga	Mitsubishi Lancer Evolution IX CT9A	5
13th	Akinori Utsumi	Nissan Silvia S15	4
14th	Tsuyoshi Tezuka	Nissan Skyline BNR32	3
15th	Takahiro Imamura	Mazda RX-7 FC3S	2
16th	Takanori Yoshida	Nissan Silvia PS13	1

=== Round 5 ===
Position	Driver	Car	Points
1st	Tetsuya Hibino	Toyota Sprinter Trueno AE86	26
2nd	Ken Nomura	Nissan Skyline ER34	21
3rd	Masao Suenaga	Mazda RX-7 FD3S	18
4th	Daigo Saito	Toyota Mark II JZX100	17
5th	Naoto Suenaga	Mitsubishi Lancer Evolution IX CT9A	13
6th	Youichi Imamura	Nissan Silvia S15	12
7th	Tomohiro Murayama	Nissan Silvia S14	11
8th	Masato Kawabata	Nissan 180SX RPS13	10
9th	Kuniaki Takahashi	Toyota Chaser JZX100	8
10th	Kenji Takayama	Mazda RX-7 FD3S	7
11th	Tsuyoshi Tezuka	Nissan Skyline BNR32	6
12th	Shinji Minowa	Toyota Mark II JZX90	5
13th	Tatsuya Sakuma	Nissan Silvia S15	4
14th	Chikara Mizuhata	Nissan Silvia S15	3
15th	Yukio Matsui	Nissan 180SX RPS13	3
16th	Akinori Utsumi	Nissan Silvia S15	1

=== Round 6 ===
Position	Driver	Car	Points
1st	Youichi Imamura	Nissan Silvia S15	25
2nd	Tetsuya Hibino	Toyota Sprinter Trueno AE86	21
3rd	Naoto Suenaga	Mitsubishi Lancer Evolution IX CT9A	18
4th	Kenji Takayama	Mazda RX-7 FD3S	16
5th	Masato Kawabata	Nissan 180SX RPS13	13
6th	Masao Suenaga	Mazda RX-7 FD3S	12
7th	Daigo Saito	Toyota Mark II JZX100	11
8th	Takahiro Imamura	Mazda RX-7 FC3S	10
9th	Naoki Nakamura	Nissan Silvia S15	8
10th	Robbie Nishida	Toyota Soarer JZZ30	7
11th	Manabu Orido	Toyota Supra JZA80	6
12th	Yoshinori Koguchi	Nissan 180SX RPS13	5
13th	Masayoshi Tokita	Toyota Crown GRS180	4
14th	Kuniaki Takahashi	Toyota Chaser JZX100	3
15th	Tatsuya Sakuma	Nissan Silvia S15	2
16th	Ken Nomura	Nissan Skyline ER34	1

=== Round 7 ===
Position	Driver	Car	Points
1st	Masato Kawabata	Nissan 180SX RPS13	25
2nd	Kenji Takayama	Mazda RX-7 FD3S	21
3rd	Daigo Saito	Toyota Mark II JZX100	18
4th	Tsuyoshi Tezuka	Nissan Skyline BNR32	16
5th	Manabu Orido	Toyota Supra JZA80	13
6th	Ken Nomura	Nissan Skyline ER34	12
7th	Yoshinori Koguchi	Nissan 180SX RPS13	11
8th	Masayoshi Tokita	Toyota Crown GRS180	10
9th	Masao Suenaga	Mazda RX-7 FD3S	8
10th	Kuniaki Takahashi	Toyota Chaser JZX100	7
11th	Ryoji Jinushi	Toyota Supra JZA80	6
12th	Manabu Fujinaka	Mazda RX-7 FD3S	5
13th	Youichi Imamura	Nissan Silvia S15	4
14th	Nobushige Kumakubo	Mitsubishi Lancer Evolution X CZ4A	3
15th	Tatsuya Sakuma	Nissan Silvia S15	2
16th	Tomokazu Hirota	Lexus GS350 GRS191	1
