= 2009 D1 Grand Prix series =

Car racing event

Seasons
- ← 2008 2010 →

The 2009 Gran Turismo D1 Grand Prix series was the ninth season for the D1 Grand Prix series and the fourth for the D1 Street Legal spinoff series. This year saw the return of the US series after its cancellation last year, its second season. The series began on March 29, 2009 at Ebisu Circuit for the D1GP and April 11 for D1SL at Bihoku Highland Circuit. The USA series consisted of four rounds and the first round was on May 2, 2009. The series concluded on December 5 as a D1SL point scoring round. Youichi Imamura took advantage of a non-score by Tsuyoshi Tezuka at the final round to claim the D1GP title in his Nissan Silvia. Meanwhile, in D1SL, Naoki Nakamura claimed that championship, also in a Silvia.

== Schedule ==
Round			Venue	Location	Date	Winner	Car
D1GP	D1SL	USA	Venue	Location	Date	Winner	Car
1			(Fukushima Prefecture) Ebisu Circuit	Fukushima Prefecture	March 29	Ken Nomura	Nissan Skyline ER34
	1		(Hiroshima Prefecture) Bihoku Highland Circuit	Hiroshima Prefecture	April 11, 12	Kiyofumi Jikuya	Nissan Silvia S15
2			(Ōita Prefecture) Autopolis	Ōita Prefecture	April 26	Youichi Imamura	Nissan Silvia S15
		1	(California) Anaheim Stadium	Anaheim, California	May 2	Daigo Saito	Toyota Chaser JZX100
Tokyo Drift Exhibition			(Tokyo) Odaiba	Tokyo Prefecture	May 23	Yoshinori Koguchi	Nissan 180SX RPS13
Tokyo Drift Exhibition			(Tokyo) Odaiba	Tokyo Prefecture	May 24	Tsuyoshi Tezuka	Nissan Skyline BNR32
		2	(Florida) Gulfstream Park	Miami, Florida	May 30	Daigo Saito	Toyota Chaser JZX100
	2		(Fukushima Prefecture) Ebisu Circuit	Fukushima Prefecture	June 13, 14	Naoki Nakamura	Nissan Silvia S15
3			(Okayama Prefecture) Okayama International Circuit	Okayama Prefecture	June 27	Daigo Saito Tetsuya Hibino	Toyota Mark II JZX100 Toyota Sprinter Trueno AE86
4			(Okayama Prefecture) Okayama International Circuit	Okayama Prefecture	June 28	Tsuyoshi Tezuka	Nissan Skyline BNR32
	3		(Tochigi Prefecture) Nikkō Circuit	Tochigi Prefecture	July 11,12	Naoki Nakamura	Nissan Silvia S15
		3	(Illinois) Soldier Field	Chicago, Illinois	August 1	Ken Nomura	Nissan Skyline ER34
5			(Fukushima Prefecture) Ebisu Circuit	Fukushima Prefecture	August 29	Masao Suenaga	Mazda RX-7 FD3S
6			(Fukushima Prefecture) Ebisu Circuit	Fukushima Prefecture	August 30	Masao Suenaga	Mazda RX-7 FD3S
		4	(New Jersey) Englishtown Raceway	Englishtown, New Jersey	September 5	Daigo Saito	Toyota Chaser JZX100
	4		(Niigata Prefecture) Nihonkai Maze Circuit	Niigata Prefecture	September 21, 22	Naoki Nakamura	Nissan Silvia S15
7			(Shizuoka Prefecture) Fuji Speedway	Shizuoka Prefecture	October 10	Masato Kawabata	Nissan 180SX RPS13
8			(Shizuoka Prefecture) Fuji Speedway	Shizuoka Prefecture	October 11	Masato Kawabata	Nissan 180SX RPS13
	5		(Fukushima Prefecture) Ebisu Circuit	Fukushima Prefecture	November 7, 8	Kiyofumi Jikuya	Nissan Silvia S15
	6		(Ibaraki Prefecture) Tsukuba Circuit	Ibaraki Prefecture	December 5	Masashi Yokoi	Nissan Silvia S14

== Results ==
=== Round 1 ===
Position	Driver	Car	Points
1st	Ken Nomura	Nissan Skyline ER34	25
2nd	Youichi Imamura	Nissan Silvia S15	21
3rd	Daigo Saito	Toyota Mark II JZX100	18
4th	Tsuyoshi Tezuka	Nissan Skyline BNR32	16
5th	Masao Suenaga	Mazda RX-7 FD3S	13
6th	Atsushi Kuroi	Nissan Silvia PS13	12
7th	Nobushige Kumakubo	Mitsubishi Lancer Evolution X CZ4A	11
8th	Yoshinori Koguchi	Nissan 180SX RPS13	10
9th	Tomohiro Murayama	Nissan Silvia S14	8
10th	Chikara Mizuhata	Nissan Silvia S15	7
11th	Kenji Takayama	Mazda RX-7 FD3S	6
12th	Naoto Suenaga	Mitsubishi Lancer Evolution IX CT9A	5
13th	Akinori Utsumi	Nissan Silvia PS13	4
14th	Masato Kawabata	Nissan 180SX RPS13	4
15th	Masayoshi Tokita	Toyota Crown GRS180	2
16th	Ken Maeda	Toyota Sprinter Trueno AE86	1

=== Round 2 ===
Position	Driver	Car	Points
1st	Youichi Imamura	Nissan Silvia S15	25
2nd	Ken Nomura	Nissan Skyline ER34	21
3rd	Nobushige Kumakubo	Mitsubishi Lancer Evolution X CZ4A	18
4th	Tetsuya Hibino	Toyota Sprinter Trueno AE86	17
5th	Tsuyoshi Tezuka	Nissan Skyline BNR32	13
6th	Koichi Yamashita	Toyota Mark II JZX100	12
7th	Daigo Saito	Toyota Mark II JZX100	11
8th	Masao Suenaga	Mazda RX-7 FD3S	10
9th	Naoki Nakamura	Nissan Silvia S15	8
10th	Masato Kawabata	Nissan 180SX RPS13	7
11th	Atsushi Kuroi	Nissan Silvia PS13	6
12th	Takahiro Imamura	Mazda RX-7 FC3S	5
13th	Masayoshi Tokita	Toyota Crown GRS180	4
14th	Manabu Fujinaka	Mazda RX-7 FD3S	3
15th	Kuniaki Takahashi	Toyota Chaser JZX100	2
16th	Akinori Utsumi	Nissan Silvia PS13	1

=== Round 3 ===
Position	Driver	Car	Points
1st	Daigo Saito	Toyota Mark II JZX100	23
1st	Tetsuya Hibino	Toyota Sprinter Trueno AE86	23
3rd	Ken Nomura	Nissan Skyline ER34	18
4th	Tsuyoshi Tezuka	Nissan Skyline BNR32	16
5th	Masato Kawabata	Nissan 180SX RPS13	14
6th	Youichi Imamura	Nissan Silvia S15	12
7th	Masayoshi Tokita	Toyota Crown GRS180	11
8th	Masao Suenaga	Mazda RX-7 FD3S	10
9th	Atsushi Kuroi	Nissan Silvia PS13	8
10th	Manabu Orido	Toyota Aristo JZS161	7
11th	Koichi Yamashita	Toyota Mark II JZX100	6
12th	Takahiro Imamura	Mazda RX-7 FC3S	5
13th	Kazuhiro Tanaka	Subaru Impreza GDB	4
14th	Kuniaki Takahashi	Toyota Chaser JZX100	3
15th	Kenji Takayama	Mazda RX-7 FD3S	2
16th	Nobushige Kumakubo	Mitsubishi Lancer Evolution X CZ4A	1

=== Round 4 ===
Position	Driver	Car	Points
1st	Tsuyoshi Tezuka	Nissan Skyline BNR32	25
2nd	Masayoshi Tokita	Toyota Crown GRS180	21
3rd	Tetsuya Hibino	Toyota Sprinter Trueno AE86	19
4th	Nobushige Kumakubo	Mitsubishi Lancer Evolution X CZ4A	16
5th	Masato Kawabata	Nissan 180SX RPS13	14
6th	Kazuyoshi Okamura	Nissan Silvia S15	12
7th	Atsushi Kuroi	Nissan Silvia PS13	11
8th	Youichi Imamura	Nissan Silvia S15	10
9th	Tatsuya Sakuma	Nissan Silvia S15	8
10th	Ken Nomura	Nissan Skyline ER34	7
11th	Kuniaki Takahashi	Toyota Chaser JZX100	6
12th	Daigo Saito	Toyota Mark II JZX100	6
13th	Hiroshi Fukuda	Nissan 180SX RPS13	4
14th	Manabu Fujinaka	Mazda RX-7 FD3S	3
15th	Yukio Matsui	Nissan 180SX RPS13	2
16th	Chikara Mizuhata	Nissan Silvia S15	1

=== Round 5 ===
Position	Driver	Car	Points
1st	Masao Suenaga	Mazda RX-7 FD3S	25
2nd	Tetsuya Hibino	Toyota Sprinter Trueno AE86	22
3rd	Tsuyoshi Tezuka	Nissan Skyline BNR32	18
4th	Youichi Imamura	Nissan Silvia S15	16
5th	Ken Nomura	Nissan Skyline ER34	14
6th	Kazuhiro Tanaka	Subaru Impreza GDB	12
7th	Nobushige Kumakubo	Mitsubishi Lancer Evolution X CZ4A	11
8th	Atsushi Kuroi	Nissan Silvia PS13	10
9th	Kenji Takayama	Mazda RX-7 FD3S	8
10th	Daigo Saito	Toyota Mark II JZX100	7
11th	Kazuyoshi Okamura	Nissan Silvia S15	6
12th	Toru Inose	Nissan Silvia S15	5
13th	Takumi Nozawa	Nissan Silvia S14	4
14th	Takahiro Imamura	Mazda RX-7 FC3S	3
15th	Masato Kawabata	Nissan 180SX RPS13	2
16th	Takanari Kato	Nissan Silvia S14	1

=== Round 6 ===
Position	Driver	Car	Points
1st	Masao Suenaga	Mazda RX-7 FD3S	25
2nd	Tsuyoshi Tezuka	Nissan Skyline BNR32	21
3rd	Nobushige Kumakubo	Mitsubishi Lancer Evolution X CZ4A	18
4th	Tetsuya Hibino	Toyota Sprinter Trueno AE86	16
5th	Tatsuya Sakuma	Nissan Silvia S15	13
6th	Youichi Imamura	Nissan Silvia S15	12
7th	Ken Nomura	Nissan Skyline ER34	11
8th	Kenji Takayama	Mazda RX-7 FD3S	10
9th	Tomohiro Murayama	Nissan Silvia S14	8
10th	Yukio Matsui	Nissan 180SX RPS13	7
11th	Daigo Saito	Toyota Mark II JZX100	6
12th	Hiroshi Fukuda	Nissan 180SX RPS13	5
13th	Yoshinori Koguchi	Nissan 180SX RPS13	4
14th	Takumi Nozawa	Nissan Silvia S14	3
15th	Masato Kawabata	Nissan 180SX RPS13	2
16th	Kazuyoshi Okamura	Nissan Silvia S15	1

=== Round 7 ===
Position	Driver	Car	Points
1st	Masato Kawabata	Nissan 180SX RPS13	25
2nd	Tatsuya Sakuma	Nissan Silvia S15	21
3rd	Youichi Imamura	Nissan Silvia S15	18
4th	Manabu Orido	Toyota Aristo JZS161	16
5th	Tsuyoshi Tezuka	Nissan Skyline BNR32	13
6th	Yoshinori Koguchi	Nissan 180SX RPS13	12
7th	Ken Nomura	Nissan Skyline ER34	11
8th	Kuniaki Takahashi	Toyota Chaser JZX100	10
9th	Atsushi Kuroi	Nissan Silvia PS13	8
10th	Masao Suenaga	Mazda RX-7 FD3S	7
11th	Masayoshi Tokita	Toyota Crown GRS180	6
12th	Chikara Mizuhata	Nissan Silvia S15	5
13th	Kazuhiro Tanaka	Subaru Impreza GDB	4
14th	Yukio Matsui	Nissan 180SX RPS13	3
15th	Daigo Saito	Toyota Mark II JZX100	3
16th	Kazuyoshi Okamura	Nissan Silvia S15	1

=== Round 8 ===
Position	Driver	Car	Points
1st	Masato Kawabata	Nissan 180SX RPS13	25
2nd	Atsushi Kuroi	Nissan Silvia PS13	22
3rd	Masayoshi Tokita	Toyota Crown GRS180	18
4th	Youichi Imamura	Nissan Silvia S15	16
5th	Nobushige Kumakubo	Mitsubishi Lancer Evolution X CZ4A	13
6th	Masao Suenaga	Mazda RX-7 FD3S	12
7th	Tatsuya Sakuma	Nissan Silvia S15	11
8th	Yukio Matsui	Nissan 180SX RPS13	10
9th	Daigo Saito	Toyota Mark II JZX100	8
10th	Kuniaki Takahashi	Toyota Chaser JZX100	7
11th	Toru Inose	Nissan Silvia S15	6
12th	Koichi Yamashita	Toyota Mark II JZX100	5
13th	Takahiro Imamura	Mazda RX-7 FC3S	4
14th	Naoki Nakamura	Nissan Silvia S15	3
15th	Kenji Takayama	Mazda RX-7 FD3S	2
16th	Tetsuya Hibino	Toyota Sprinter Trueno AE86	1

== Final Championship Results ==
=== D1GP ===
Position	Driver	Car	rd.1	rd.2	rd.3	rd.4	rd.5	rd.6	rd.7	rd.8	Total
1st	Youichi Imamura	Nissan Silvia S15	21	25	12	10	16	12	18	16	130
2nd	Tsuyoshi Tezuka	Nissan Skyline BNR32	16	13	16	25	18	21	13	0	122
3rd	Ken Nomura	Nissan Skyline ER34	25	21	18	7	13	11	11	0	106
4th	Masao Suenaga	Mazda RX-7 FD3S	13	10	10	0	25	25	7	12	102
5th	Tetsuya Hibino	Toyota Sprinter Trueno AE86	0	17	23	19	22	16	0	1	98
6th	Masato Kawabata	Nissan 180SX RPS13	4	7	14	14	2	2	25	25	93
7th	Nobushige Kumakubo	Mitsubishi Lancer Evolution X CZ4A	11	18	1	16	11	18	0	13	88
8th	Daigo Saito	Toyota Mark II JZX100	18	11	23	6	7	6	3	8	82
9th	Atsushi Kuroi	Nissan Silvia PS13	12	6	8	11	10	0	8	22	77
10th	Masayoshi Tokita	Toyota Crown GRS180	2	4	11	21	0	0	6	18	62
11th	Tatsuya Sakuma	Nissan Silvia S15	0	0	0	8	0	13	21	11	53
12th	Kenji Takayama	Mazda RX-7 FD3S	6	0	2	0	8	10	0	2	28
12th	Kuniaki Takahashi	Toyota Chaser JZX100	0	2	3	6	0	0	10	7	28
14th	Yoshinori Koguchi	Nissan 180SX RPS13	10	0	0	0	0	4	12	0	26
15th	Manabu Orido	Toyota Aristo JZS161	0	–	7	0	0	0	16	0	23
15th	Koichi Yamashita	Toyota Mark II JZX100	0	12	6	0	0	0	0	5	23
17th	Yukio Matsui	Nissan 180SX RPS13	–	–	0	2	0	7	3	10	22
18th	Kazuyoshi Okamura	Nissan Silvia S15	0	0	0	12	6	1	1	0	20
18th	Kazuhiro Tanaka	Subaru Impreza GDB	0	0	4	0	12	0	4	0	20
20th	Drift Samurai	Mazda RX-7 FC3S	0	5	5	0	3	0	0	4	17
21st	Tomohiro Murayama	Nissan Silvia S14	8	0	0	0	0	8	0	0	16
22nd	Chikara Mizuhata	Nissan Silvia S15	7	2	0	1	0	0	5	0	15
23rd	Naoki Nakamura	Nissan Silvia S15	0	8	0	0	0	0	0	3	11
23rd	Toru Inose	Nissan Silvia S15	–	–	0	0	5	0	0	6	11
25th	Hiroshi Fukuda	Nissan 180SX RPS13	0	–	0	4	0	5	0	0	9
26th	Takumi Nozawa	Nissan Silvia S14	0	–	0	0	4	3	0	0	7
27th	Manabu Fujinaka	Mazda RX-7 FD3S	–	3	0	3	0	0	0	0	6
28th	Naoto Suenaga	Mitsubishi Lancer Evolution IX CT9A	5	0	0	0	0	0	0	0	5
28th	Akinori Utsumi	Nissan Silvia PS13	4	1	0	0	0	0	0	0	5
30th	Ken Maeda	Toyota Sprinter Trueno AE86	1	0	0	0	0	0	0	0	1
30th	Takanari Kato	Nissan Silvia S14	0	–	0	0	1	0	0	0	1

=== D1SL ===
Position	Driver	Car	rd.1	rd.2	rd.3	rd.4	rd.5	rd.6	Total
1st	Naoki Nakamura	Nissan Silvia S15	6	26	25	25	16	13	111
2nd	Kiyofumi Jikuya	Nissan Silvia S15	25	21	8	0	25	18	97
3rd	Seimi Tanaka	Nissan Silvia PS13	13	12	5	18	13	21	82
4th	Masashi Yokoi	Nissan Silvia S14	–	4	21	12	18	25	80
5th	Kenji Kiguchi	Nissan Laurel C33	21	7	0	8	21	12	69
6th	Tsuyoshi Tezuka	Nissan Skyline ER34	12	11	18	10	1	10	62
7th	Kunihiko Teramachi	Nissan Silvia PS13	18	10	11	2	3	11	55
8th	Masami Mikami	Nissan Skyline ECR33	–	18	13	16	0	7	54
9th	Hideyuki Fujino	Nissan Silvia S15	0	0	16	7	12	16	51
10th	Hiroyuki Fukuyama	Nissan Silvia PS13	12	3	12	1	11	2	41
11th	Yuji Tanaka	Nissan Silvia S14	16	5	0	6	7	0	34
12th	Yukiharu Komagata	Nissan 180SX RPS13	–	–	–	22	0	–	22
13th	Miyuki Kishiume	Nissan Silvia PS13	–	16	0	0	0	4	20
14th	Yukio Matsui	Toyota Supra JZA80	–	0	–	13	–	6	19
15th	Kousuke Kamiya	Nissan 180SX RPS13	–	13	0	0	0	5	18
16th	Michinori Ito	Toyota Chaser JZX100	0	0	10	0	6	0	16
17th	Yoshiaki Waki	Nissan Silvia S14	–	6	2	0	5	0	13
18th	Yusuke Kitaoka	Toyota Mark II JZX100	–	8	0	0	4	0	12
18th	Ryuichi Aoki	Nissan Silvia S15	–	0	0	4	–	8	12
20th	Tomohiro Kurashina	Nissan Silvia S14	–	0	–	11	0	–	11
20th	Kazuya Bai	Nissan 180SX RPS13	–	–	–	–	10	1	11
22nd	Ikou Saito	Nissan 180SX RPS13	10	0	0	0	–	0	10
23rd	Takamasa Kuroi	Nissan Silvia S15	8	0	0	0	0	0	8
23rd	Masanori Kohashi	Nissan 180SX RPS13	–	0	0	0	8	0	8
25th	Kazuhiro Kubo	Nissan 180SX RPS13	7	0	0	0	0	0	7
25th	Shiro Deura	Nissan Silvia S15	0	–	7	0	–	0	7
27th	Akihiko Hirashima	Nissan Silvia S14	–	–	6	–	0	0	6
27th	Kazuki Hayashi	Nissan Silvia S14	1	0	0	0	2	3	6
29th	Takashi Hagisako	Nissan Silvia PS13	5	0	0	0	0	0	5
29th	Takashi Onoda	Nissan Silvia S15	0	–	–	5	0	0	5
29th	Satoshi Kajiwara	Nissan Silvia S15	2	0	3	0	0	0	5
32nd	Haruki Nanba	Nissan Silvia PS13	4	0	0	–	0	0	4
32nd	Norio Saito	Nissan Silvia PS13	–	–	4	0	0	0	4
34th	Yoshifumi Tadokoro	Toyota Sprinter Trueno AE86	3	–	0	0	–	0	3
34th	Masamune Ochiai	Nissan Silvia S14	–	0	0	3	0	0	3
36th	Tsutomu Endou	Nissan 180SX RPS13	–	2	0	0	0	0	2
37th	Yuuki Inaoka	Nissan Silvia S15	0	1	0	0	0	0	1
37th	Kyogo Kitayama	Nissan 180SX RPS13	0	0	1	0	0	0	1
