= Tomokazu =

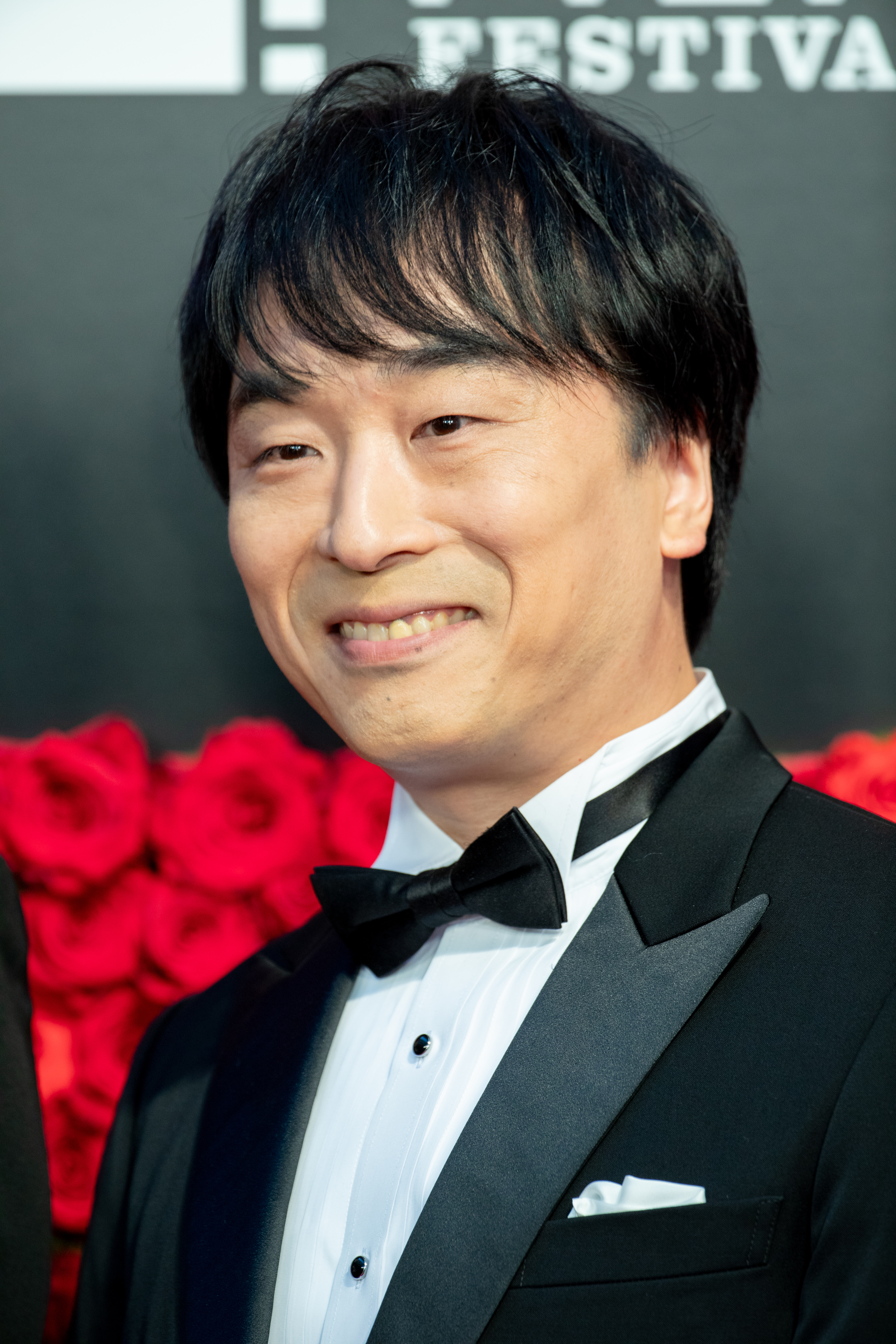
- Tomokazu Seki, Japanese voice actor
- Pronunciation: tomokadzɯ (IPA)
- Gender: Male

Origin
- Origin: Japanese
- Meaning: Different meanings depending on the kanji used

Tomokazu is a masculine Japanese given name.

== Written forms ==
Tomokazu can be written using different combinations of kanji characters. Some examples:

- 友一, "friend, one"
- 友和, "friend, harmony"
- 友多, "friend, many"
- 友数, "friend, number"
- 知一, "know, one"
- 知和, "know, harmony"
- 知多, "know, many"
- 知数, "know, number"
- 智一, "intellect, one"
- 智和, "intellect, harmony"
- 智多, "intellect, many"
- 智数, "intellect, number"
- 共一, "together, one"
- 共和, "together, harmony"
- 朋一, "companion, one"
- 朋和, "companion, harmony"
- 朝一, "morning/dynasty, one"
- 朝和, "morning/dynasty, harmony"
- 朝多, "morning/dynasty, many"
- 朝数, "morning/dynasty, number"

The name can also be written in hiragana ともかず or katakana トモカズ.

== Notable people with the name ==
- Tomokazu Fujino (藤野 智一; born 1967), Japanese cyclist
- Tomokazu Harimoto (張本 智和; born 2003), Japanese table tennis player
- Tomokazu Hirama (平間 智和; born 1977), Japanese footballer
- Tomokazu Hirota (廣田 友和; born 1976), Japanese drifting driver
- Tomokazu Jumonji (十文字 友和; born 1976), Japanese sumo wrestler
- Tomokazu Miura (三浦 友和; born 1952), Japanese actor
- Tomokazu Myojin (明神 智和; born 1978), Japanese footballer
- Tomokazu Nagira (柳楽 智和; born 1985), Japanese footballer
- Tomokazu Seki (関 智一; born 1972), Japanese voice actor
- Tomokazu Sugita (杉田 智和; born 1980), Japanese voice actor
- Tomokazu Tokoro (所 智一), Japanese anime director
- Tomokazu Wakino (脇野 智和; born 1976), Japanese archer
- Tomokazu Yoshida (吉田 友一; born 1982), Japanese actor
