= Yasuyuki Kazama =

Japanese racing driver

- Nationality: Japan
- Born: 1 February 1970 (age 56) Shimosuwa, Nagano, Japan

D1 Grand Prix
- Years active: 2001–2006
- Teams: Kei Office, DG-5, Team M.O.V.E.
- Wins: 7
- Best finish: 1 in 2005

Championship titles
- 2005: 1

Yasuyuki Kazama (風間靖幸, Kazama Yasuyuki; born 1 February 1970) is a drifting driver from Japan, formerly competing in D1 Grand Prix, well known for using the Nissan Silvia S15. He is also known as Waku Waku and Spin Benz Dokan.

== Biography ==
Kazama was first introduced to drifting at age 17 when he watched Gengo Kitazawa, who later became his spotter and mentor, drifting on a touge. As soon as he got his driving licence he began drifting in his Toyota Corolla Levin AE86 with the proceeds of his job in a filling station. He later escaped death when his car slid down underneath a crash barrier and fell 30 feet down the mountain. He was originally a mechanic and sponsor driver for "Kei-Office" until 31 August 2005, when he left the company to start up his own shop called Rodextyle but he continued to support Tsuchiya's company as the sponsor driver for his new company DG-5 until 2007 which he eventually retired from competition drifting to focus on Rodextyle.

Kazama was formerly known as Spin Benz Dokan due to an incident that happened after the 2001 D1GP season finals in Nikko, when Sunpros had filmed a 'Team Drift' segment for the Drift Heaven series and involved hitting a then-D1 Driver Toru Maruyama's daily Mercedes Benz. He was later known as Waku Waku Kun or Rodeo Clown due to his reputation as a clown within the series and being well known for his Rodeo Drift, a form of doughnutting by sitting on the driver's door of the car which he first practiced at the Big-X events, then later at D1GP pre-tsuisou rounds warm-ups in 2005 when he changed the side windows of his car to make it possible to perform the trick.

Kazama is also known in the United Kingdom for his only mainstream TV appearance outside Japan in the BBC2 show Top Gear, in which he teaches Richard Hammond drifting in a stock Vauxhall Monaro VX-R. As with the rising popularity of the drifting scene there, he has since made two appearances in both Autocar in April 2006, driving a Caterham Seven and February 2007 issue of the Octane.

=== Drifting career ===
Kazama made a name for himself in drifting contests throughout the 90s, driving a Nissan Silvia S13, Nissan Skyline GT-R BNR32, Toyota Mark II JZX90, and a Nissan Silvia S14. In 1994, he placed 3rd overall for Young Version's STCC (Super Technic Challenge Cup) event, a yearly single-run competition series that was judged by Keiichi Tsuchiya and was held at Tsukuba Circuit as the series' main venue. In 1996, Kazama won the STCC event of that year, which would also be the series's final event (23 December 1996). In 1997, he won the Chubu Ikaten which took place at Rally Kids INA (INA Circuit) along with his team "Kazama Juku" winning the team class. In 1998, he won the one-make S14 drift champion contest hosted by Manabu Orido and Video Option which took place at Sportsland Sugo's Kart course. He also had placed 3rd in the 5th All-Japan Ikaten competition at Suzuka Circuit's South course that year. In 2000, he won the 2nd Ikaten Superstar Drift Battle held at Ebisu Circuit's South course which was held in April. 26th, 2000. He became one of the first drivers to use an S15 for drifting but was heavily in debt until his patience paid off when he was sponsored by Tsuchiya to be the driver for Kei-Office, whom he also worked for as a mechanic.

D1 Grand Prix

From when he first started in the D1GP series at the end of 2000, Kazama had moderate success, but when he teamed up with Gengo, things started to pay off. He ran his personal S15 until Kei-Office debuted a blue S15 at the Final Round in Nikko, which the car was being worked on throughout the 2001 season and was also continued to be used for the 2002 and 2003 season.

In 2002, Kazama managed to earn the runner-up spot at 2nd round in Ebisu Circuit against Nobuteru Taniguchi. Onwards, however, he was unable to get past through the qualifying runs which ended up with him being ranked 17th overall.

In 2003, the Kei-Office team had debuted a new track-spec S15 at the fourth round in Fuji Speedway which wore the company's signature jade green, Prodrive GC-06D rims and a new 2003-spec original brand body kit (now under Rodextyle) as the previous kit was co-produced by Behrman/Wisesquare. He still had moderate success especially taking the runner-up spot once again at Round 5 in Ebisu. He was ranked 12th overall.

In 2004, this was marked as a start to a successful season for Kazama as he won his first event at the season opener in Irwindale, it was an important pinpoint since he's a veteran drifter within the Japanese drifting community. At the championship round finale, Kei-Office once again debuted another S15 which was previously the company's 2002 season car, with the main focuses of a stricter setup than the previous car by the use of Driftmaster rims, an HKS 2.2L stroker kit setup by Auto Produce Boss, Speed Glass lightweight windows, and utilizing a Holinger sequential transmission. The car was later reused for the 2005 and 2006 seasons. The 2003-spec S15 was used only for international events throughout 2005 until the car was exported to Norway in 2007. He had a very steady season and was able to keep a seeded position. He was ranked fourth overall.

In 2005, Kazama managed to win the season opener held at Irwindale once again. He also earned more victories at Sugo and Ebisu rounds to rack up his position as the series point leader. At the championship finale, he was crowned as the 2005 D1GP champion and earned the championship title by beating Masao Suenaga only by one point.

In 2006, Kazama switched teams from Kei-Office to DG-5 with 2005 championship car having cosmetic changes, specifically with the Kei-Office aero being removed for GP Sports' G-Sonic 'D1' kit. He manages to once again win the season opener in Irwindale, earning him a nickname that some would say, the 'Irwindale Meister'. The S15 remained green until it was later repainted to blue after DG-5 collaborated with Avex's M.O.V.E, starting in Round 2 onwards. He had a steady season earning a second win at the third round in Fuji and ranked third overall, however, it would be the last season that he would compete in the D1 Grand Prix. He also earned a victory for the U.K. exhibition match in Silverstone Circuit with a T-car S15, later used by Hideo Hiraoka the following year along with other D1 drivers from 2008 on-wards. The 2005 championship car would later be used by Katsuhiro Ueo (2007), Youichi Imamura (2008–2011), Yoshinori Koguchi (2012–2013), and Shinji Minowa (2014).

== Drifting results ==
Colour	Result
Gold	Winner
Silver	2nd place
Bronze	3rd place
Green	Last 4 [Semi-final]
Blue	Last 8 [Quarter-final]
Purple	Last 16 (16) [1st Tsuiou Round OR Tandem Battle] (Numbers are given to indicate Top 10 finish)
Black	Disqualified (DSQ) (Given to indicate that the driver has been stripped of their position through disqualification)
White	First Round (TAN) [Tansou OR Qualifying Single Runs]
Red	Did not qualify (DNQ)

- When driver's position are highlighted in blue, this indicates either the driver earned 100pt or 100pt tansou (solo run) bonus has been awarded, with the latter being in use for Pre-2005.

=== D1 Grand Prix ===
Year	Entrant	Car	1	2	3	4	5	6	7	8	Position	Points
2001	Kei Office	Nissan Silvia S15	EBS; 9	NIK; 3	BHH; TAN	EBS; TAN	NIK; TAN				11th	22
2002	Kei Office	Nissan Silvia S15	BHH; DNQ	EBS; 2	SGO; TAN	TKB; TAN	EBS; TAN	SEK; DNQ	NIK; TAN		17th	18
2003	Kei Office	Nissan Silvia S15	TKB; DNQ	BHH; 16	SGO; 10	FUJ; 8	EBS; 2	SEK; 16	TKB; 16		12th	26
2004	Kei Office	Nissan Silvia S15	IRW; 1	SGO; 1	EBS; 8	APS; 4	ODB; 8	EBS; 16	TKB; 8		4th	72
2005	Kei Office	Nissan Silvia S15	IRW; 1	ODB; 3	SGO; 1	APS; 5	EBS; 1	FUJ; 16	TKB; 7		1st	97
2006	Team M.O.V.E w/ DG-5	Nissan Silvia S15	IRW; 1	SGO; 16	FUJ; 1	APS; 3	EBS; 16	SUZ; 16	FUJ; 6	IRW; 2	3rd	91

== Bibliography ==
- Morton, Paul (2006). "1 Introduction to Drifting". How to Drift: The Art of Oversteer. S-A Design Series. CarTech Inc. pp. 15, 119. ISBN 9781932494235.
- Coonce, Cole (2010). "All of your races belongs to us". Sex & Travel & Vestiges of Metallic Fragments. Cole Coonce reader. Vol. 1. K-Bomb Publishing. p. 36. ISBN 9781452802138.

Preceded by Ryuji Miki	D1 Grand Prix Champion; 2005	Succeeded by Nobushige Kumakubo
