= Masato Kawabata =

Japanese professional drifting driver (born 1977)

- Nationality: Japan
- Born: 15 October 1977 (age 49) Osaka, Osaka Prefecture

D1 Grand Prix career
- Debut season: 2002
- Current team: Team TOYO TIRES DRIFT
- Former teams: TRUST
- Championships: 3
- Wins: 19
- Best finish: 1st in 2007, 2013, 2015

Previous series
- 2017-2019 2019,2021: FIA Intercontinental Drifting Cup; Russian Drift Series

Championship titles
- 2007 2013 2015 2017: D1 Grand Prix; FIA Intercontinental Drifting Cup

Masato Kawabata (川畑 真人, Kawabata Masato; 15 October 1977, in Osaka) is a Japanese professional drifting driver, currently competing in the D1 Grand Prix series for Team TOYO TIRES DRIFT.

== Biography ==
Kawabata first received his license at 18 and at that point he bought a Nissan 180SX. He practiced alone until he met late D1 driver Atsushi Kuroi who started to teach and advise Kawabata. At age 19, Kawabata entered a drift magazine sponsored contest and took first place. At 21, GP Sports started to sponsor Kawabata with a full line of aero parts and later he worked for them moving from his hometown to Niigata where GP Sports was based.

=== D1 Grand Prix ===
In 2002, Kawabata win the Advan Drift Meeting event at Ebisu circuit where he acquired D1GP license. In the same year, he debut at round 4 of D1 Grand Prix which also held at Ebisu circuit. He would continued compete as privateer with support from GP Sports.

In 2004, Kawabata was hired by Trust to replace Hideo Hiraoka and drove an S15 Silvia built by GP Sports. On his third season with the team, he took his first win at Fuji Speedway in 2006 and went on to finish fourth in the overall points.

Kawabata's S15 Silvia with 2005 livery

For 2007, Kawabata drove for Toyo Tires, who entered D1GP as a works team but continued to drive the same S15 from the previous year. Initially, Toyo wanted Kawabata to mentor Atsushi Kuroi as lead driver, however Kuroi suggested Kawabata instead. he did even better however and despite a crash in Fuji with Daigo Saito where Kawabata suffers a concussion, he win two rounds and dramatically win the overall title by one point over Nobushige Kumakubo who loses his semifinal battle against Yoshinori Koguchi. In 2008 after he win the opening round, Kawabata changed his car to 180SX in second round in Fuji however he would struggle with the car and ended sixth in standings. In years following he would consistently win at least 1 round in every season including the final round of 2009 season which would be his and Atsushi Kuroi last competitive battle in D1GP before Kuroi died in 2010.

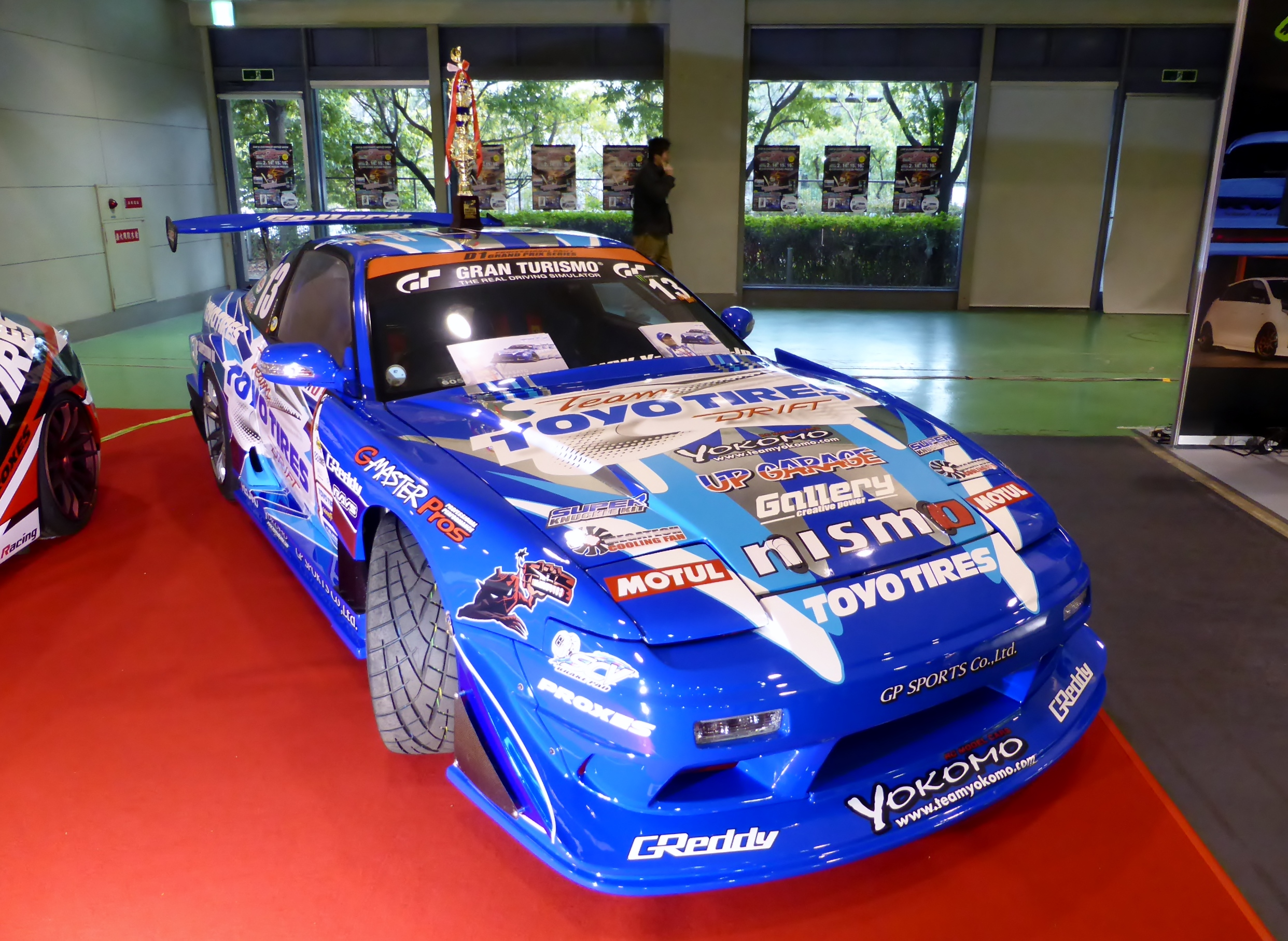
Kawabata's championship winning 180SX

In 2013 Kawabata win his second title following two Solo and Overall win at Ebisu and Odaiba and become the first driver to win both Solo and Overall championship since the Solo Run championship is awarded in 2011.

In 2014, TRUST returned and collaborated with Toyo Tires and he started to participate in D1GP with Nissan GT-R in 2014. Kawabata also left GP Sports in same year after working for them since 2003.

The following year the Kawabata win two rounds at the opening round in Odaiba and Tsukuba on his way to clinched his third D1GP title before the final round becoming second driver to do so. Kawabata also win his one and only appearance in Formula Drift Japan at Fuji Speedway which is part of the Formula Drift World Championship round.

2016 was difficult year for him as Daigo Saito went to dominate the series. Despite able to beat Saito in exhibition event he went winless for the second time in 3 years and he finished the season second in standings. He also started his own shop called True Man Racing (True Man is rough English translation of his name) and collaborating with fellow D1 driver Hideyuki Fujino they released a bodykit for Nissan 180SX called Kick Blue.

Following the defeat from previous year Trust built, Kawabata new GT-R for 2017 season while his previous car was driven by returning Masao Suenaga, Toyo Tires as tires sponsor also released new Proxes R888R for competition. He win the third round in Tsukuba which his only win in the season, he end the season 5th in standings.

In 2018, Kawabata won six straight Solo Run creating a new record but unfortunately in Battle Run he failed to win a single round and lost the D1GP title to Masashi Yokoi.

In 2019, following Trust withdrawals, Kawabata competed in the D1GP with Toyota GR Supra and became the first person to win D1GP round with it the following year. Unfortunately, his performance worsened as the season progressed. He changed his car to new Toyota GR86 in 2022 built by his teammate Hideyuki Fujino where he gave GR86 first ever win in Drift competition, finished the season as runner-up claiming two wins and the Solo Run champions. He won a single round in both 2023 and 2024 season.

=== Other drifting competition ===
Kawabata rarely compete outside of D1GP and Japan but he regularly compete in D1GP oversea competition.

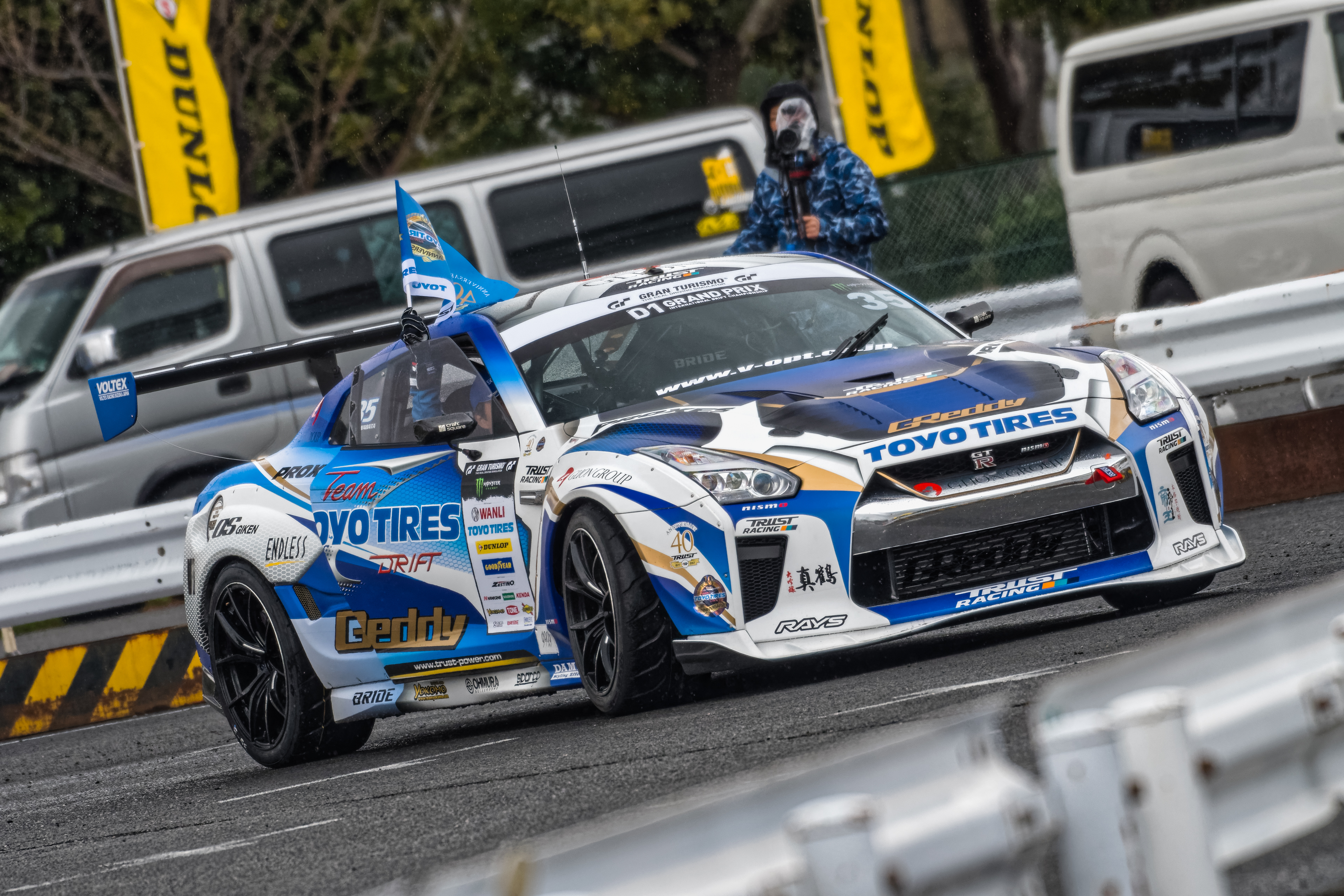
Trust R35 in which Kawabata win FIA IDC with

With D1GP expansion to China, Kawabata compete in D1GP China with his own built car. After coming third in inaugural season, he win the championship the following year an continued to compete until series is stopped after 2018. With D1GP reviving its overseas expansion, Kawabata start to compete in D1GP Thailand and Southeast Asia for Drive to Drift which is a team formed by his former teammate and Thai driver Daychapon Toyingcharoen. In 2023 he win the D1GP Southeast Asia title after competing in all Thailand and Malaysian round of the series.

Kawabata compete in the inaugural FIA Intercontinental Drift Cup at Odaiba which is the first drifting competition held under FIA driving the same Nissan GT-R he use in D1GP where he become the inaugural champion after winning the first leg and runner-up in second leg. He continued to compete in the next two edition of the competition but unable to reclaim the championship.

In 2019 Kawabata compete for Forward Auto in Russia Drift Series GP driving a 180SX however due to COVID-19 pandemics he's unable to compete in 2020. He returned to the competition in 2021 once again driving 180SX but he personally built it himself. Unfortunately he is unable to participate for full season due to travel restrictions.

=== Outside of drifting ===
==== Rally raid ====
Kawabata make his rallying debut at 2019 Asia Cross Country Rally driving for Flex Show Aikawa Racing with Toyo Tires driving a Toyota Land Cruiser where he finished second in class. Due to COVID-19 pandemic, the team unable to compete until 2024 where Kawabata return now with fellow D1GP driver Daychapon Toyingcharoen as his co-driver. The pair won their class and finished and sixteenth overall.

==== Endurance racing ====
Kawabata make his endurance racing debut at 2018 25 Hours of Thunderhill driving a Nissan GT-R NISMO. He returned to the competition the following year this time driving an Audi R8 GT4.

In 2025, as a part of Toyo Tires Nurburgring program, Kawabata debut in Nürburgring Langstrecken-Serie driving a Toyota Supra in VT2-RWD claas in round 1 and 6 and aiming to compete in Nurburgring 24 hours race the following year. He returned to NLS the following year for the opening round but due to bad weather the race is cancelled. His position is replaced by his D1GP teammate Hideyuki Fujino at the following round due to his commitment in Asia Cross Country Rally. He returned to NLS for the 6th round of the season.

Kawabata make his Nürburgring 24 Hours debut on the 2026 edition of the race alongside fellow Toyo Tires drifter, Jin Horino and Hokuto Matsuyama and Gran Turismo champion, Takuma Miyazono driving the same Toyota Supra used in NLS where the team finished fourth in class.

== 2007 Fuji Speedway accident ==
In 2007, at round 2, held in Fuji Speedway, during a sudden death round against Daigo Saito, Saito dipped into the inner apex of the 300R corner and jumped the curb of the track. His car's front wheels lost traction, which resulted in the car to understeer and collect Kawabata's Silvia into the tyre barrier in the process, effectively destroying both cars.

The impact between the cars and when they were hurled into the track protection barrier happened at speeds of over 150 km/h. Kawabata immediately come out from his car but fell to the ground just as he walk out and had to be taken to hospital for treatment for whiplash injuries, Saito miraculously evaded any physical damages.

Kawabata won the battle which he was unable to continue, leaving Atsushi Kuroi without an opponent and eventually winning the round and dedicated it to Kawabata as Kuroi had mentored Kawabata. For the following round at Suzuka, he returned with a new car and took the win at the next round at Sportsland SUGO.

== Complete Drifting Results ==
Colour	Result
Gold	Winner
Silver	2nd place
Bronze	3rd place
Green	Last 4 [Semi-final]
Blue	Last 8 [Quarter-final]
Purple	Last 16 (16) [1st Tsuiou Round OR Tandem Battle] (Numbers are given to indicate Top 10 finish)
Black	Disqualified (DSQ) (Given to indicate that the driver has been stripped of their position through disqualification)
White	First Round (TAN) [Tansou OR Qualifying Single Runs]
Red	Did not qualify (DNQ)

- When driver's position are highlighted in blue, this indicates either the driver earned 100pt or 100pt tansou (solo run) bonus has been awarded, with the latter being in use for Pre-2005.

=== D1 Grand Prix ===
Year	Entrant	Car	1	2	3	4	5	6	7	8	Position	Points
2002		Nissan 180SX	BHH	EBS	EBS	SGO; DNQ	TKB; DNQ	SEK	NIK		NC	0
2003	Silk Road	Nissan 180SX	TKB; DNQ	BHH; DNQ	SGO; DNQ	FUJ; TAN	EBS; TAN	SEK	TKB; DNQ		NC	0
2004	Silk Road	Toyota Sprinter Trueno AE86	IRW; TAN								23rd	4
2004	GReddy/GP Sports/Toyo Tires	Nissan Silvia S15		SGO; TAN	EBS; DNQ	APS; 9	ODB; DNQ	EBS; 16	TKB; DNQ		23rd	4
2005	GReddy/GP Sports/Toyo Tires	Nissan Silvia S15	IRW; 16	ODB; 4	SGO; 9	APS; 7	EBS; TAN	FUJ; 3	TKB; 5		4th	55
2006	GReddy/GP Sports/Toyo Tires	Nissan Silvia S15	IRW; 5	SGO; 16	FUJ; 6	APS; TAN	EBS; 4	SUZ; 8	FUJ; 1	IRW; 16	4th	69
2007	GReddy/GP Sports/Toyo Tires	Nissan Silvia S15	EBS; 2	FUJ; 4	SUZ; 6	SGO; 1	EBS; 5	APS; 1	FUJ; 16		1st	100
2008	GP Sports/Toyo Tires	Nissan 180SX RPS13	EBS; 1	FUJ; TAN	SUZ; 15	OKY; 11	APS; 3	EBS	FUJ		6th	54
2009	Team TOYO TIRES DRIFT	Nissan 180SX RPS13	EBS; 14	APS; 10	OKY; 5	OKY; 5	EBS; 15	EBS; 15	FUJ; 1	FUJ; 1	6th	93
2016	TOYO TIRES DRIFT TRUST RACING	Nissan R35	ODB; 2	FUJ; 2	TKB; 3	TKB; 8	EBS; 9	EBS; 3	ODB; 2		2nd	133
2017	TOYO TIRES GLION TRUST RACING	Nissan R35	ODB; 5	ODB; 4	TKB; 1	MSI; 13	EBS; 14	EBS; 7	ODB; 6		5th	106

=== Russian Drift Series GP ===
Year	Entrant	Car	1	2	3	4	5	6	7	Position	Points
2019	Forward Auto	Nissan 180SX	MRW	ATR	NRING	ADM	RRING	SOC; 6		26	262
2021	Forward Auto	Nissan 180SX	MRW; 19	NRING; 13	IGORA; 11	ATR; 7	RRING	ADM	SOC	19	328

Preceded by Nobushige Kumakubo	D1 Grand Prix Champion; 2007	Succeeded by Daigo Saito
Preceded by Nobushige Kumakubo	D1 Grand Prix Champion; 2013	Succeeded by Kuniaki Takahashi
Preceded by Kuniaki Takahashi	D1 Grand Prix Champion; 2015	Succeeded by Daigo Saito
