= Youichi Imamura =

Japanese drifting driver (born 1976)

Youichi Imamura 今村陽一
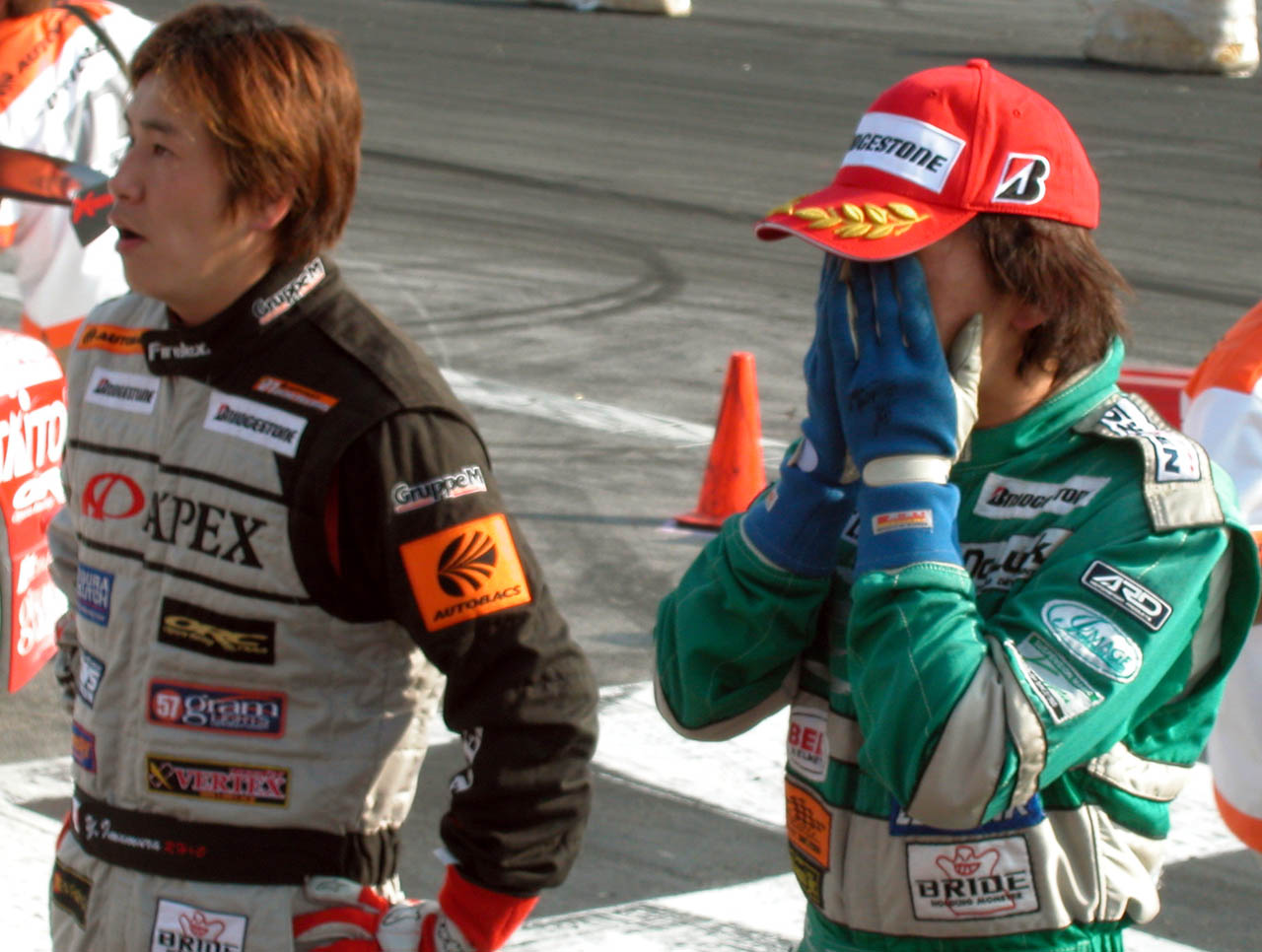
- Imamura (left) during 2005 D1GP Irwindale
- Nationality: Japan
- Born: 11 May 1976 (age 50) Kai, Yamanashi Prefecture

D1 Grand Prix career
- Debut season: 2001
- Years active: 2001 - 2019
- Former teams: MMM Racing, OTG Motorsport, Nichiei Racing, Auto Produce BOSS, Top Secret with ORC, A'PEXi, I.C.B.M.
- Wins: 16

Championship titles
- 2003 2009 2010 2011: 4

Youichi Imamura (今村陽一, Imamura Yôichi; 11 May 1976, Yamanashi) is a Japanese professional drifting driver, currently serving as a judge in Formula Drift Japan after he stopped competing in 2019.

Besides driving and drifting, his other passion is flowers as his parents ran a florist business. When he is not drifting he is working as a florist in Yamanashi. His favourite time of the week is when he and his wife drive out to collect stock.

Imamura has been competing in the D1 Grand Prix series since it began in October 2000. His first successful year was the 2003 season where he won the series title in his A'PEXi Mazda RX-7 (FD3S). After A'PEXi left the series he switched to ORC and has been working with the team to improve the performance of the Nissan Fairlady Z coming in sixth in the 2007 series. In 2008, he switched to the newly formed team Auto Produce Boss with Potenza D-1 Project, driving their Nissan Silvia S15 which was actually Yasuyuki Kazama's 2005 Championship car. He went on to win the 2009, 2010 and 2011 Series Championship in this car, making him the only driver with the most championship titles at four, the first driver to win titles in consecutive years, the second driver with the most wins at 16 after Daigo Saito. He remained compete in D1 driving for Nichiei Racing, OTG Motorsports and MMM Racing, he stopped competing after 2019 season and now became one of the judge for Formula Drift Japan.

Like rival drifter who he was team mate to, Ryuji Miki, Imamura also competed in the Net'z Cup, a one make series for the Toyota Altezza between 2005 and its final season in 2006, his racing antics were documented twice on Video Option.

== Complete drifting results ==
Colour	Result
Gold	Winner
Silver	2nd place
Bronze	3rd place
Green	Last 4 [Semi-final]
Blue	Last 8 [Quarter-final]
Purple	Last 16 (16) [1st Tsuiou Round OR Tandem Battle] (Numbers are given to indicate Top 10 finish)
Black	Disqualified (DSQ) (Given to indicate that the driver has been stripped of their position through disqualification)
White	First Round (TAN) [Tansou OR Qualifying Single Runs]
Red	Did not qualify (DNQ)

- When driver's position are highlighted in blue, this indicates either the driver earned 100pt or 100pt tansou (solo run) bonus has been awarded, with the latter being in use for Pre-2005.

=== D1 Grand Prix ===
Year	Entrant	Car	1	2	3	4	5	6	7	8	Position	Points
2001	I.C.B.M.	Toyota Sprinter Trueno AE86	EBS; 1	NIK; 6	BHH; 8	EBS; 5	NIK; 2				2nd	66
2002	A'PEXi	Toyota Altezza SXE10	BHH; TAN	EBS; TAN	SGO; TAN						5th	54
2002	A'PEXi	Mazda RX-7 FD3S				TKB; 1	EBS; 7	SEK; 8	NIK; 1		5th	54
2003	A'PEXi	Mazda RX-7 FD3S	TKB; 4	BHH; 3	SGO; 2	FUJ; 1	EBS; 1	SEK; 16	TKB; 2		1st	106
2004	A'PEXi	Mazda RX-7 FD3S	IRW; 16	SGO; 6	EBS; 6	APS	ODB; 2	EBS; 1	TKB; 1		3rd	78
2005	A'PEXi	Mazda RX-7 FD3S	IRW; 2	ODB; 9	SGO; 5	APS; 16	EBS; 5	FUJ; 16	TKB; 1		3rd	68
2006	ORC with Top Secret	Nissan Fairlady Z Z33	IRW; 16	SGO; 9	FUJ; 8	APS; TAN	EBS	SUZ	FUJ; 16	IRW; 8	15th	19
2007	ORC with Top Secret	Nissan Fairlady Z Z33	EBS; DNQ	FUJ; 12	SUZ; 3	SGO; 10	EBS; TAN	APS; 3	FUJ; 4		6th	51
2008	Auto Produce Boss with Potenza D-1 Project	Nissan Silvia S15	EBS; 7	FUJ; 14	SUZ; 5	OKY; 1	APS; 4	EBS	FUJ		3rd	70
2009	Auto Produce Boss with Potenza D-1 Project	Nissan Silvia S15	EBS; 2	APS; 1	OKY; 6	OKY; 8	EBS; 4	EBS; 6	FUJ; 3	FUJ; 4	1st	130
2010	M7 Boss SGC with Dunlop	Nissan Silvia S15	ODB; 1	APS; 5	FUJ; 1	OKY; 3	EBS; 6	EBS; 1	FUJ; 13		1st	122

== Sources ==
- JDM Option
- D1 Grand Prix
- Silky House Flower Boutique
- Home page
- Auto Produce Boss

Preceded by Katsuhiro Ueo	D1 Grand Prix Champion; 2003	Succeeded by Ryuji Miki
