= 2007 D1 Grand Prix series =

Motor racing competition

Seasons
- ← 2006 2008 →

The 2007 Autobacs D1 Grand Prix series was the seventh season for the D1 Grand Prix series and was the second season for its spinoff D1 Street Legal.

It was the first time since 2003 that the entire series took place entirely in Japan.

It began on 4 February 2007, as a D1SL exclusive event at Sekia Hills, the mainstay D1GP event opened on 25 March at Ebisu Circuit. In the same year, due to its popularity of its US point scoring round that was held over three seasons, it saw the introduction of its own domestic series. The series would suffer two setbacks as it suffered from two cancellations. The first was at Irwindale Speedway on 11 March, due to its Japanese competitors who had been building cars specially to compete in the series but could not get the cars ready in time for the event.

The D1 US organisation suffered a further blow when, due to unresolved issues, the Alameda County Board of Supervisors refused license to the D1 event to take place at Altamont Motorsports Park on 24 June, forcing it to be cancelled.

It was to be the second season for the Malaysian franchise, D1MY; but due to unforeseen circumstances, round 1, which was to take place on March, was cancelled. Nothing has been heard about the organisation since.

The season will be best remembered for the two-car accident between Masato Kawabata and Daigo Saito in Fuji Speedway, when during the sudden death second round, Saito dipped into the inner apex of the 300R corner, causing his car to understeer and collecting Kawabata's Silvia onto the tyre barrier in the process, severely destroyed both cars. Kawabata had a second luck escape as when he collided with the barrier, a nitrous tank housed on the passenger side of his vehicle exploded from the impact, but played no part in Kawabata's injury. Among those narrowly escaping death was Video Option cameraman, Zaku, had to duck to avoid debris from the crash. Both drivers survived without serious injuries, but however Kawabata had to be taken to hospital for treatment for whiplash injuries.

The season will end on 25 November with an end of season All-Star event. The last D1GP event held will be on 21 October at Fuji Speedway and 11 November for D1SL at Sekia Hills.

== Changes for the 2007 Season ==
- The D1 Gals pairing of Kazumi Kondo and Jyuri Tamashiro have now been replaced by a quadruple called the "D1 Sisters" from D-Sign, consisting of Hiromi Goto, Yuria Tachiki, Asami Kikuchi and Ayaka Tashiro. Unlike earlier girls who had an extensive background as race queens, the group was recruited via auditions.
- The final year with Japanese car accessory retailer Autobacs as a title sponsor which was replaced by Sony's Gran Turismo videogame franchise for the All-Star event.

== 2007 Schedules ==
=== 2007 D1 Grand Prix Point Series ===
Round 1 - March 24/25 - Ebisu South Course, Fukushima Prefecture, Japan - Nobushige Kumakubo (GDB)
Round 2 - April 28/29 - Fuji Speedway, Shizuoka Prefecture, Japan - Atsushi Kuroi (PS13)
Round 3 - May 26/27- Suzuka Circuit, Mie Prefecture, Japan - Masao Suenaga (FD3S)
Round 4 - June 9/10 - Sports Land SUGO, Miyagi Prefecture, Japan - Masato Kawabata (S15)
Round 5 - August 25/26 - Ebisu South Course, Fukushima Prefecture, Japan - Ken Nomura (ER34)
Round 6 - September 22/23- Autopolis, Ōita Prefecture, Japan - Masato Kawabata (S15)
Round 7 - October 20/21 - Fuji Speedway, Shizuoka Prefecture, Japan - Masao Suenaga (FD3S)

=== 2007 D1 Street Legal Series ===
Round 1 - February 3/4 - Sekia Hills, Kumamoto Prefecture, Japan - Kazuya Matsukawa (RPS13)
Round 2 - May 26/27 - Suzuka Circuit, Mie Prefecture, Japan (D1GP Week) - Yukiharu Komagata (GDB)
Round 3 - June 9/10- Sports Land SUGO, Miyagi Prefecture, Japan (D1GP Week) - Jin Horino (S14)
Round 4 - August 25/26 - Ebisu South Course, Fukushima Prefecture, Japan (D1GP Week) - Yukio Matsui (RPS13)
Round 5 - November 10/11- Sekia Hills, Kumamoto Prefecture, Japan - Takashi Hagisako (RPS13)

=== Exhibition Rounds ===
==== D1GP Exhibition ====
Exhibition 1 - May 4/5 - Old Bridge Township Raceway Park, Englishtown, New Jersey - Nobushige Kumakubo (GDB)
Exhibition 2 - July 13/14 - Las Vegas Motor Speedway, Las Vegas, Nevada - Youichi Imamura (Z33)
Exhibition 3 - November 24 - Irwindale Speedway, Irwindale, California - Nobushige Kumakubo (CT9A)
All Star Duel - November 25 - Irwindale Speedway, Irwindale, California - Vaughn Gittin Jr. (S197)

== Championship Results ==
=== Round 1 ===
Position	Driver	Car	Points
1st	Nobushige Kumakubo	Subaru Impreza GDB	20
2nd	Masato Kawabata	Nissan Silvia S15	18
3rd	Masao Suenaga	Mazda RX-7 FD3S	16
4th	Tsuyoshi Tezuka	Nissan Skyline BNR32	14
5th	Tetsuya Hibino	Toyota Corolla Levin AE86	13
6th	Ken Nomura	Nissan Skyline ER34	11
7th	Katsuhiro Ueo	Nissan Silvia S15	8
8th	Takashi Haruyama	Nissan Laurel C35	6
9th	Tatsuya Sakuma	Nissan Silvia S15	5
10th	Takahiro Ueno	Toyota Soarer JZZ30	3
11th	Toshiki Yoshioka	Toyota Sprinter Trueno AE86	1
12th	Kazuhiro Tanaka	Subaru Impreza GDB	1
13th	Toru Inose	Nissan Silvia S15	1
14th	Yukio Matsui	BMW M3 E36	1
15th	Daigo Saito	Toyota Mark II JZX90	1
16th	Naoto Suenaga	Subaru Impreza GC8	1

=== Round 2 ===
Position	Driver	Car	Points
1st	Atsushi Kuroi	Nissan Silvia PS13	21
2nd	Masao Suenaga	Mazda RX-7 FD3S	19
3rd	Nobushige Kumakubo	Subaru Impreza GDB	17
4th	Masato Kawabata	Nissan Silvia S15	15
5th	Yoshinori Koguchi	Nissan 180SX RPS13	12
6th	Michihiro Takatori	Nissan Skyline ER34	10
7th	Daigo Saito	Toyota Mark II JZX90	9
8th	Tetsuya Hibino	Toyota Corolla Levin AE86	6
9th	Tsuyoshi Tezuka	Nissan Skyline BNR32	5
10th	Hideo Hiraoka	Nissan Silvia S15	2
11th	Naoto Suenaga	Subaru Impreza GC8	2
12th	Youichi Imamura	Nissan Fairlady Z Z33	2
13th	Ryoji Jinushi	Toyota Soarer JZZ30	1
14th	Toshiki Yoshioka	Toyota Sprinter Trueno AE86	1
15th	Takahiro Ueno	Toyota Soarer JZZ30	1
16th	Ken Nomura	Nissan Skyline ER34	2

=== Round 3 ===
Position	Driver	Car	Points
1st	Masao Suenaga	Mazda RX-7 FD3S	21
2nd	see note		-
3rd	Youichi Imamura	Nissan Fairlady Z Z33	16
4th	Nobushige Kumakubo	Subaru Impreza GDB	14
5th	Kazuyoshi Okamura	Nissan Silvia S15	12
6th	Masato Kawabata	Nissan Silvia S15	11
7th	Ken Nomura	Nissan Skyline ER34	8
8th	Tsuyoshi Tezuka	Nissan Skyline BNR32	7
9th	Tsutomu Fujio	Mazda RX-7 FD3S	4
10th	Kazuhiro Tanaka	Subaru Impreza GDB	2
11th	Tomokazu Hirota	Toyota Verossa JZX110	1
12th	Toshiki Yoshioka	Toyota Sprinter Trueno AE86	2
13th	Kensaku Komoro	Toyota Sprinter Trueno AE86	1
14th	Atsushi Kuroi	Nissan Silvia PS13	1
15th	Toyohisa Matsuda	Toyota Corolla Levin AE86	1
16th	Tatsuya Sakuma	Nissan Silvia S15	1

note. Tetsuya Hibino was originally awarded second place but was later disqualified after it was revealed that he had deliberately swerved into the path of Suenaga's car before the first corner during a Sudden Death match, causing a collision. Therefore, Hibino was stripped of his position and no second place was awarded.

=== Round 4 ===
Position	Driver	Car	Points
1st	Masato Kawabata	Nissan Silvia S15	20
2nd	Nobushige Kumakubo	Subaru Impreza GDB	18
3rd	Hideo Hiraoka	Nissan Silvia S15	16
4th	Masao Suenaga	Mazda RX-7 FD3S	14
5th	Toru Inose	Nissan Silvia S15	13
6th	Ken Nomura	Nissan Skyline ER34	11
7th	Akinori Utsumi	Nissan Silvia PS13	8
8th	Toshiki Yoshioka	Toyota Sprinter Trueno AE86	6
9th	Kuniaki Takahashi	Toyota Chaser JZX100	5
10th	Youichi Imamura	Nissan Fairlady Z Z33	3
11th	Takahiro Ueno	Toyota Soarer JZZ30	1
12th	Tsuyoshi Tezuka	Nissan Skyline BNR32	1
13th	Masayoshi Tokita	Toyota Soarer MZ12	1
14th	Kazuhiro Tanaka	Subaru Impreza GDB	2
15th	Tomokazu Hirota	Toyota Verossa JZX110	2
16th	Michihiro Takatori	Nissan Skyline ER34	2

=== Round 5 ===
Position	Driver	Car	Points
1st	Ken Nomura	Nissan Skyline ER34	20
2nd	Akinori Utsumi	Nissan Silvia PS13	18
3rd	Tsuyoshi Tezuka	Nissan Skyline BNR32	16
4th	Kensaku Komoro	Toyota Sprinter Trueno AE86	14
5th	Masato Kawabata	Nissan Silvia S15	13
6th	Daigo Saito	Toyota Mark II JZX100	10
7th	Tetsuya Hibino	Toyota Corolla Levin AE86	8
8th	Nobushige Kumakubo	Mitsubishi Evolution IX CT9A	6
9th	Toshiki Yoshioka	Toyota Sprinter Trueno AE86	4
10th	Toru Inose	Nissan Silvia S15	2
11th	Masao Suenaga	Mazda RX-7 FD3S	1
12th	Atsushi Kuroi	Nissan Silvia PS13	1
13th	Tomokazu Hirota	Toyota Verossa JZX110	1
14th	Hiroshi Fukuda	Nissan 180SX RPS13	1
15th	Ken Maeda	Toyota Sprinter Trueno AE86	1
16th	Hideo Hiraoka	Nissan Silvia S15	2

=== Round 6 ===
Position	Driver	Car	Points
1st	Masato Kawabata	Nissan Silvia S15	21
2nd	Takahiro Ueno	Toyota Soarer JZZ30	19
3rd	Youichi Imamura	Nissan Fairlady Z Z33	16
4th	Tatsuya Sakuma	Nissan Silvia S15	15
5th	Toshiki Yoshioka	Toyota Sprinter Trueno AE86	13
6th	Daigo Saito	Toyota Mark II JZX100	10
7th	Tsuyoshi Tezuka	Nissan Skyline BNR32	9
8th	Nobushige Kumakubo	Mitsubishi Evolution IX CT9A	7
9th	Masayoshi Tokita	Toyota Soarer MZ12	4
10th	Ken Nomura	Nissan Skyline ER34	3
11th	Hisashi Oginome	Nissan Silvia S15	1
12th	Atsushi Kuroi	Nissan Silvia PS13	1
13th	Masao Suenaga	Mazda RX-7 FD3S	1
14th	Toru Inose	Nissan Silvia S14	1
15th	Michihiro Takatori	Nissan Skyline ER34	1
16th	Kazuyoshi Okamura	Nissan Silvia S15	1

=== Round 7 ===
Position	Driver	Car	Points
1st	Masao Suenaga	Mazda RX-7 FD3S	20
2nd	Yoshinori Koguchi	Nissan 180SX RPS13	19
3rd	Nobushige Kumakubo	Mitsubishi Evolution IX CT9A	17
4th	Youichi Imamura	Nissan Fairlady Z Z33	14
5th	Toshiki Yoshioka	Toyota Sprinter Trueno AE86	12
6th	Daigo Saito	Toyota Mark II JZX100	11
7th	Tsuyoshi Tezuka	Nissan Skyline BNR32	9
8th	Toru Inose	Nissan Silvia S15	6
9th	Takahiro Ueno	Toyota Soarer JZZ30	5
10th	Tatsuya Sakuma	Nissan Silvia S15	2
11th	Ken Nomura	Nissan Skyline ER34	2
12th	Masato Kawabata	Nissan Silvia S15	2
13th	Akinori Utsumi	Nissan Silvia PS13	1
14th	Hisashi Oginome	Nissan Silvia S15	1
15th	Atsushi Kuroi	Nissan Silvia PS13	1
16th	Tetsuya Hibino	Toyota Corolla Levin AE86	2

== Final Championship Results ==
=== D1GP ===
Position	Driver	Car	rd.1	rd.2	rd.3	rd.4	rd.5	rd.6	rd.7	Total
1st	Masato Kawabata	Nissan Silvia S15	18	15	11	20	13	21	2	100
2nd	Nobushige Kumakubo	Subaru Impreza GDB / Mitsubishi Evolution IX CT9A	20	17	14	18	6	7	17	99
3rd	Masao Suenaga	Mazda RX-7 FD3S	16	19	21	14	1	1	20	92
4th	Tsuyoshi Tezuka	Nissan Skyline BNR32	14	5	7	1	16	9	9	61
5th	Ken Nomura	Nissan Skyline ER34	11	2	8	11	20	3	2	57
6th	Youichi Imamura	Nissan Fairlady Z Z33	-	2	16	3	-	16	14	51
7th	Daigo Saito	Toyota Mark II JZX90 / Toyota Mark II JZX100	1	9	-	-	10	10	11	41
8th	Toshiki Yoshioka	Toyota Sprinter Trueno AE86	1	1	2	6	4	13	12	39
9th	Yoshinori Koguchi	Nissan 180SX RPS13	-	12	-	-	-	-	19	31
10th	Takahiro Ueno	Toyota Soarer JZZ30	3	1	-	1	-	19	5	29
10th	Tetsuya Hibino	Toyota Corolla Levin AE86	13	6	-	-	8	-	2	29
12th	Akinori Utsumi	Nissan Silvia PS13	-	-	-	8	18	-	1	27
13th	Atsushi Kuroi	Nissan Silvia PS13	-	21	1	-	2	1	1	26
14th	Tatsuya Sakuma	Nissan Silvia S15	5	-	1	-	-	15	2	23
14th	Toru Inose	Nissan Silvia S15 / Nissan Silvia S14	1	-	-	13	2	1	6	23
16th	Hideo Hiraoka	Nissan Silvia S15	-	2	-	16	2	-	-	20
17th	Kensaku Komoro	Toyota Sprinter Trueno AE86	-	-	1	-	14	-	-	15
18th	Kazuyoshi Okamura	Nissan Silvia S15	-	-	12	-	-	1	-	13
18th	Michihiro Takatori	Nissan Skyline ER34	-	10	-	2	-	1	-	13
20th	Katsuhiro Ueo	Nissan Silvia S15	8	-	-	-	-	-	-	8
21st	Takashi Haruyama	Nissan Laurel C35	6	-	-	-	-	-	-	6
22nd	Masayoshi Tokita	Toyota Soarer MZ12	-	-	-	1	-	4	-	5
22nd	Kuniaki Takahashi	Toyota Chaser JZX100	-	-	-	5	-	-	-	5
22nd	Kazuhiro Tanaka	Subaru Impreza GDB	1	-	2	2	-	-	-	5
25th	Tsutomu Fujio	Mazda RX-7 FD3S	-	-	4	-	-	-	-	4
25th	Tomokazu Hirota	Toyota Verossa JZX110	-	-	1	2	1	-	-	4
27th	Naoto Suenaga	Subaru Impreza GC8	1	2	-	-	-	-	-	3
28th	Hisashi Oginome	Nissan Silvia S15	-	-	-	-	-	1	1	2
29th	Ryoji Jinushi	Toyota Soarer JZZ30	-	1	-	-	-	-	-	1
29th	Yukio Matsui	BMW M3 E36	1	-	-	-	-	-	-	1
29th	Hiroshi Fukuda	Nissan 180SX RPS13	-	-	-	-	1	-	-	1
29th	Toyohisa Matsuda	Toyota Corolla Levin AE86	-	-	1	-	-	-	-	1
29th	Ken Maeda	Toyota Sprinter Trueno AE86	-	-	-	-	1	-	-	1

- Highlighted in blue - 100pt tansou (solo run) bonus
- Source: D1GP Official Site 2007 Championship table

=== D1SL ===
Position	Driver	Car	rd.1	rd.2	rd.3	rd.4	rd.5	Total
1st	Kazuya Matsukawa	Nissan 180SX RPS13	20	2	10	18	13	63
2nd	Yukio Matsui	Nissan 180SX RPS13	10	15	1	20	10	56
3rd	Takashi Hagisako	Nissan Silvia PS13	14	9	6	1	21	51
4th	Yukiharu Komagata	Subaru Impreza GDB	-	20	-	1	18	39
5th	Naoki Nakamura	Nissan 180SX RPS13 / Nissan Silvia S15	-	18	-	-	15	33
6th	Katsuhiro Ueo	Nissan Silvia S15	2	10	1	1	17	31
7th	Naoto Suenaga	Nissan Silvia PS13	12	-	-	16	-	28
8th	Tetsuya Hibino	Nissan Silvia S15	-	-	12	14	1	27
9th	Shinya Kaneoka	Nissan Silvia S15 / Nissan Skyline ER34 / Nissan 180SX RPS13	1	12	-	-	8	21
10th	Jin Horino	Nissan Silvia S14	-	-	20	-	-	20
10th	Shinichiro Yasukouchi	Nissan Silvia PS13	18	1	-	-	1	20
12th	Kosuke Kamiya	Nissan Silvia PS13	-	-	18	-	-	18
12th	Tomohiro Murayama	Nissan 180SX RPS13	-	-	16	2	-	18
14th	Kazutaka Yamashita	Mazda RX-7 FD3S	16	-	-	-	1	17
14th	Kazuyoshi Okamura	Nissan Silvia S15 / Nissan Fairlady Z Z33	1	16	-	-	-	17
16th	Naoya Yamano	Nissan Silvia S15	-	1	14	-	-	15
16th	Akihiko Hirashima	Nissan 180SX RPS13 / Nissan Silvia S14	1	-	-	12	2	15
18th	Masami Mikami	Nissan Silvia S14	-	1	-	10	2	13
18th	Iwajiro Honma	Nissan Skyline ECR32	-	1	-	6	6	13
20th	Seimi Tanaka	Nissan Silvia S14	1	6	1	1	1	10
21st	Yuji Nakamura	Toyota Sprinter Trueno AE86	8	-	-	-	-	8
21st	Shinji Iida	Nissan Silvia S14	-	-	8	-	-	8
21st	Kenji Kiguchi	Nissan Laurel C33	-	-	-	8	-	8
21st	Shiro Deura	Nissan Silvia S14	6	1	1	-	-	8
21st	Masashi Yokoi	Nissan Silvia S14 / Nissan Silvia S15	4	-	-	4	-	8
26th	Hiroyuki Fukuyama	Nissan Silvia PS13	-	4	-	1	-	5
27th	Kiyofumi Jikuya	Nissan Silvia S15	-	-	4	-	-	4
27th	Shigenobu Koga	Nissan Silvia PS13	-	-	-	-	4	4
29th	Tomokazu Nakao	Nissan Silvia S14	2	-	-	-	-	2
29th	Hidenari Izu	Nissan Silvia S15	-	-	2	-	-	2
29th	Shuichi Yoshioka	Toyota Chaser JZX100	-	-	1	1	-	2
29th	Osamu Yamaguchi	Nissan Silvia S14	2	-	-	-	-	2
33rd	Takashi Hiyane	Toyota Corolla Levin AE86	-	1	-	-	-	1
33rd	Tetsurou Nakada	Toyota Mark II JZX110 / Toyota Mark II JZX100	-	-	1	-	-	1
33rd	Takayuki Minami	Nissan Silvia PS13	-	-	-	-	1	1

- Highlighted in blue - 100pt tansou (solo run) bonus
- Source: D1GP Official Site 2007 Championship table

== See also ==
- D1 Grand Prix
- Drifting (motorsport)

== Sources ==
D1GP.co.jp / D1GP.com
