= 2005 D1 Grand Prix series =

Motor racing competition

Seasons
- ← 2004 2006 →

== Changes for the 2005 season ==
- Keiichi Tsuchiya being the sole judge, with Manabu Orido leaving his spot to become a D1GP competitor.
- The introduction of the DriftBox being used as a judging aid.
- A points scoring system is introduced which drivers are awarded 10 to 0 depending to their performance to the rival, 10-0 being the highest and 5-5 is considered a draw, as a result, it is up to the judges to call for a sudden death match, if the score becomes too close. The scoring system was used briefly in 2003 and 2004 seasons.
- 10th place no longer jointly awarded points as was the case in prior seasons—1pt now awarded to the best six drivers of the best 16 tsuiso round.

== 2005 Schedules ==
n.b. Winning Driver are mentioned on the right

=== 2005 D1 Grand Prix Point Series ===
Round 1 - February 26/27 - Irwindale Speedway, Irwindale, California, USA - Yasuyuki Kazama (S15)
Round 2 - April 16 - Metropolitan Parking, Odaiba, Japan - Katsuhiro Ueo (AE86)
Round 3 - May 7/8 - Sports Land SUGO, Miyagi Prefecture, Japan - Yasuyuki Kazama (S15)
Round 4 - August 6/7 - Autopolis, Ōita Prefecture, Japan - Toshiki Yoshioka (AE85)
Round 5 - August 20/21 - Ebisu South Course, Fukushima Prefecture, Japan - Yasuyuki Kazama (S15)
Round 6 - October 22/23 - Fuji Speedway, Shizuoka Prefecture, Japan - Masao Suenaga (FD3S)
Round 7 - November 20 - Tsukuba Circuit, Ibaraki Prefecture, Japan - Youichi Imamura (FD3S)

=== 2005 D1 Grand Prix Exhibition Matches ===
D1 Odaiba Allstar Exhibition - April 17 - Metropolitan Parking, Odaiba, Japan - Youichi Imamura (FD3S)
D1 Street Legal Exhibition - August 20/21 - Ebisu South Course, Fukushima Prefecture, Japan - Naoto Suenaga (S15)
D1 UK Exhibition - October 2 - Silverstone, England - Ryuji Miki (S15)
D1 Street Legal Exhibition 2 - November 20 - Tsukuba Circuit, Ibaraki Prefecture, Japan - Kazuto Ichiyanagi (RPS13)
D1 USA vs Japan Allstar Exhibition - December 17 - Irwindale Speedway, Irwindale, California, USA - Vaughn Gittin Jr. (MUSTANG)

== Race Reports ==
=== USA vs Japan All Star Exhibition ===
This event was originally to be run at the same Auto Club Speedway as a double bill of the GT Live event, but due to unforeseen circumstances, the JGTC organisers cancelled the event and the D1GP event were moved to Irwindale.

During the USA vs Japan All Star Exhibition event in December, the organisers, rather than running the course the usual anti-clockwise route that is found in ovals, the course was run in the other direction. Many drivers had trouble adjusting to the new track change, including Ken Nomura, the Import drag racing star Stephan Papadakis on his debut drifting season and Rhys Millen who all crashed during qualifying. One notable debuts was the father of Rhys, Rod Millen, the rallying and Pikes Peak legend, with all the thirty year motorsport experiences he gained, he broke into the last 16 on his first ever D1 outing in his Mazda RX-8. After a long break from his Last 16 appearance at round 1 in 2004 due to competing in a Dodge Viper Competition Coupe, which rendered him ineligible for participation, Samuel Hubinette would make a return with his SRT-10 at the last 16 along with Alex Pfeiffer and Tanner Foust.

The event was mainly noted for having a non Japanese driver and car to win over the Japanese who usually dominates all the D1 events. Vaughn Gittin Jr. took first place after defeating Tatsuya Sakuma, who was driving an APP Racing Silvia S15 with his Falken Tire sponsored Ford Mustang GT through a One More Time rerun. He also defeated two championship winners (Yasuyuki Kazama and Youichi Imamura) en route.

== Final Championship Results ==
Position	Driver	Car	rd.1	rd.2	rd.3	rd.4	rd.5	rd.6	rd.7	Total
1st	Yasuyuki Kazama	Nissan Silvia S15	20	16	20	12	20	1	8	97
2nd	Masao Suenaga	Mazda Efini RX-7 FD3S	10	12	10	16	14	20	14	96
3rd	Youichi Imamura	Mazda Efini RX-7 FD3S	18	4	12	1	12	1	20	68
4th	Nobushige Kumakubo	Nissan Silvia S15/Subaru Impreza GDB	14	-	2	10	12	12	16	55
4th	Masato Kawabata	Nissan Silvia S15	1	14	4	8	-	16	12	55
6th	Ken Nomura	Nissan Skyline ER34	6	-	18	4	1	14	6	49
7th	Katsuhiro Ueo	Toyota Sprinter Trueno AE86	-	20	-	1	4	18	2	45
8th	Tatsuya Sakuma	Nissan Silvia S15	-	-	16	6	-	1	18	41
9th	Toshiki Yoshioka	Toyota Sprinter Trueno AE86/Toyota Corolla Levin AE85	1	8	-	20	1	-	10	40
10th	Nobuteru Taniguchi	Nissan Silvia S15/Toyota Altezza SXE10	2	18	-	-	6	10	-	36
11th	Tetsuya Hibino	Toyota Corolla Levin AE86	-	-	8	18	-	-	-	28
12th	Manabu Orido	Toyota Supra JZA80	-	6	1	-	18	-	-	25
13th	Kazuhiro Tanaka	Nissan Silvia S15/Subaru Impreza GDB	1	1	14	2	2	-	-	20
14th	Tsuyoshi Tezuka	Nissan Skyline BNR32	-	-	1	-	16	2	-	19
15th	Takahiro Ueno	Toyota Soarer JZZ30	16	-	-	1	-	-	1	18
16th	Ryuji Miki	Nissan Fairlady Z Z33	4	10	-	-	1	-	1	16
17th	Shinji Matsukawa	Nissan 180SX RPS13/Nissan Silvia PS13	-	-	-	14	-	-	-	14
18th	Rhys Millen	Pontiac GTO	12	-	-	-	-	-	-	12
19th	Naoto Suenaga	Nissan Silvia PS13	-	1	-	-	10	-	-	11
20th	Ken Maeda	Mazda Efini RX-7 FD3S	8	1	-	-	-	-	-	9
21st	Masayoshi Tokita	Toyota Soarer MZ12	-	-	-	-	8	-	-	8
21st	Shuichi Yoshioka	Nissan 180SX RPS13	-	-	-	-	-	8	-	8
21st	Kenji Takayama	Mazda RX-7 FC3S	-	2	6	-	-	-	-	8
24th	Takumi Nozawa	Nissan Silvia S14	-	-	-	-	-	6	-	6
25th	Ken Shinose	Nissan Silvia PS13	-	-	-	-	-	4	-	4
25th	Kouichi Yamashita	Mazda RX-8 SE3P	-	-	-	-	-	-	4	4
27th	Hideo Hiraoka	Toyota Corolla Levin AE85/Nissan Fairlady Z Z33	1	-	1	-	1	-	-	3
28th	Kuniaki Takahashi	Toyota Chaser JZX100	1	1	-	-	-	-	-	2
28th	Toyohisa Matsuda	Toyota Corolla Levin AE86	1	1	-	-	-	-	-	2
28th	Shinji Minowa	Toyota Corolla Levin AE86	-	-	1	1	-	-	-	2
28th	Drift Samurai	Mazda RX-7 FC3S	-	-	-	1	1	-	-	2
32nd	Shinichi Yamada	Nissan Silvia S15	-	1	-	-	-	-	-	1
32nd	Michihiro Takatori	Nissan Skyline BNR34	-	-	1	-	-	-	-	1
32nd	Koji Togasaki	Toyota Sprinter Trueno AE86	-	-	1	-	-	-	-	1
32nd	Manabu Fijinaka	Mazda Efini RX-7 FD3S	-	-	-	1	-	-	-	1
32nd	Junichi Miyamoto	Nissan 180SX RPS13	-	-	-	-	-	1	-	1
32nd	Masaru Kakemizu	Nissan 180SX RPS13	-	-	-	-	-	1	-	1
32nd	Atsushi Kuroi	Nissan Silvia PS13	-	-	-	-	-	-	1	1
32nd	Daigo Saito	Toyota Mark II JZX90	-	-	-	-	-	-	1	1
32nd	Kensaku Komoro	Toyota Sprinter Trueno AE86	-	-	-	-	-	-	1	1

- Source: D1GP Official Site 2005 Championship table

== See also ==
- D1 Grand Prix
- Drifting (motorsport)

== Sources ==
D1GP Results Database 2005
