= Atsushi Kuroi =

Japanese racing driver

- Nationality: Japan
- Born: 30 March 1969
- Died: 1 February 2010 (aged 40)
- Relatives: (list of notable relatives with line breaks)

D1 Grand Prix career
- Debut season: 2001
- Current team: Team TOYO TIRES Drift with River Side
- Wins: 1
- Best finish: 9th in 2009

Previous series
- (previous series with line breaks)

Championship titles
- (championship titles)

Atsushi Kuroi (黒井敦史, Kuroi Atsushi; 30 March 1969 – 2 February 2010, Osaka) was a Japanese professional drifting driver who competed in the D1 Grand Prix series for Team Toyo with River Side. He died on 2 February 2010 during the evening following a motorcycle accident the day before.

Kuroi loved cars from an early age and dreamed of getting his license. When he did, the first car he got was a four-wheel drive as he was into WRC at the time. He enjoyed dirt driving but ran out of money for repairs to his car so he bought a Nissan Silvia (S13) and turned to drifting. He practiced a lot but as he mainly did it alone he couldn't tell whether he was any good, so he studied the drift bible and some other books on drifting to try to improve. Though he never knew whether he was any good until he began competing against other people. He was the manager of the River Side Tuning Garage in the Osaka prefecture, so he sponsored himself.

Kuroi competed in the D1 Grand Prix series since it began in 2001, until his death before the 2010 season. He always used a Nissan Silvia (S13) as he loved the way they drift. The Silvias he used in the D1GP are not usual, his old one had an RB26 from a Nissan Skyline GT-R and his current car has a 1.5JZ from a Toyota Chaser, as he liked the bigger displacement engines. Kuroi won his first and only D1GP victory in 2007 at Fuji Speedway.

== Death ==
On the evening of 1 February 2010, Kuroi was hit by another vehicle while travelling home from work on his motorcycle. Kuroi later died in the hospital after bleeding to death from injuries to his thigh.

A memorial for Kuroi was featured at the Osaka Auto Messe.

== Complete drifting results ==
Colour	Result
Gold	Winner
Silver	2nd place
Bronze	3rd place
Green	Last 4 [Semi-final]
Blue	Last 8 [Quarter-final]
Purple	Last 16 (16) [1st Tsuiou Round OR Tandem Battle] (Numbers are given to indicate Top 10 finish)
Black	Disqualified (DSQ) (Given to indicate that the driver has been stripped of their position through disqualification)
White	First Round (TAN) [Tansou OR Qualifying Single Runs]
Red	Did not qualify (DNQ)

- When driver's position are highlighted in blue, this indicates either the driver earned 100pt or 100pt tansou (solo run) bonus has been awarded, with the latter being in use for Pre-2005.

=== D1 Grand Prix ===
Year	Entrant	Car	1	2	3	4	5	6	7	8	Position	Points
2001		Nissan Silvia PS13	EBS	NIK; DNQ	BHH; DNQ	EBS; DNQ	NIK					0
2002		Nissan Silvia PS13	BHH; TAN	EBS; DNQ	EBS; DNQ	SGO; TAN						0
2002		Nissan 180SX RPS13					TKB; DNQ	SEK	NIK			0
2003	River Side / Toyo Tires	Nissan Silvia PS13	TKB; TAN	BHH; DNQ	SGO; DNQ	FUJ; TAN	EBS; DNQ	SEK	TKB; DNQ			0
2004	River Side	Nissan 180SX RPS13	IRW; 7		EBS; 9						16	14
2004	River Side / Toyo Tires	Nissan Silvia PS13		SGO; TAN		APS; 16	ODB; TAN	EBS; DNQ	TKB; 10		16	14
2005	River Side / Toyo Tires	Nissan Silvia PS13	IRW	ODB; DNQ	SGO; DNQ	APS; DNQ	EBS; DNQ	FUJ; DNQ	TKB; 16		32	1
2006	River Side / Toyo Tires	Nissan Silvia PS13	IRW; 16	SGO; 2	FUJ; TAN	APS; 16	EBS; TAN	SUZ; 16	FUJ; 10	IRW; 16	13	26
2007	River Side / Toyo Tires	Nissan Silvia PS13	EBS; TAN	FUJ; 1	SUZ; 14	SGO; TAN	EBS; 12	APS; 12	FUJ; 13		13	26
2008	River Side / Toyo Tires	Nissan Silvia PS13	EBS; TAN	FUJ; 6	SUZ; 2	OKY; TAN	APS; 9	EBS	FUJ		8	44
