= DriftBox =

A DriftBox is a device used in the sport of drifting to teach event judges the qualities desired in it.

A driftbox is based on a GPS unit which can measure the drift angle of a car, while also measuring the speed, g-force and circuit position. The DriftBox works by using the Course Over Ground (COG) measurement from the GPS at ten times per second (which is in degrees from due North) and comparing this with the angle the car is pointing. The car's angle is calculated using a high accuracy yaw rate sensor, which is integrated over time to give angle.

In competition use, a score out of ten is awarded to the competitor by measuring the peak lateral g-force and the peak angle during a maneuver. All of this information is saved to a data logger (in the form of an SD/MMC card). The DriftBox can also be used to measure braking distances, quarter mile times and speeds, as well as lap times using a virtual start/finish line generated from the latitude/longitude measurements from the GPS.

== See also ==
- Drifting (motorsport)
- GPS
