= Tetsuya Hibino =

Japanese professional drifting driver (born 1974)

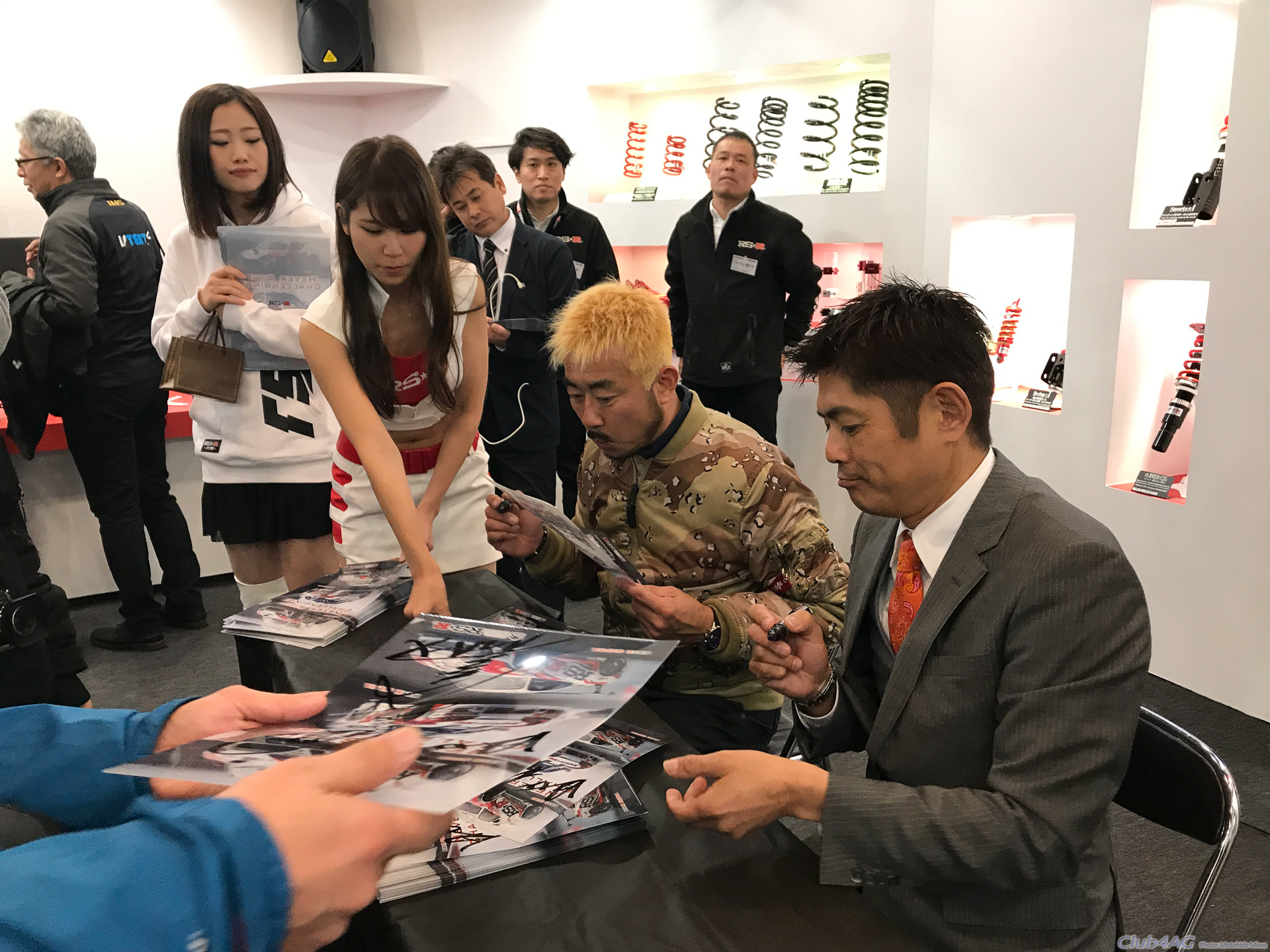
- Hibino (right) at 2019 Tokyo Auto Salon alongside Manabu Orido
- Nationality: Japan
- Born: 10 April 1974 (age 52) Aichi, Japan

D1 Grand Prix career
- Debut season: 2002
- Current team: Shibata Racing Team
- Former teams: SunRise, Gulf Racing Zestino Tire, K'Spec, Droo-P
- Wins: 5
- Best finish: 3rd in 2024

Previous series
- Russian Drift Series; D1 Street Legal

Championship titles
- 2015 2018: RDS Asia; D1GP China

Tetsuya Hibino (日比野哲也, Hibino Tetsuya) (born 10 April 1974 in Aichi) is a Japanese professional drifting driver, currently competing in the D1 Grand Prix series for Shibata Racing Team.

Like many of the drivers in the D1 Grand Prix, Hibino is the owner of his own tuning shop called SunRise, and works on his car himself. Before starting in D1GP, he was part of a team called, "Dropout Racing". He is quite a popular driver as he is one of the best drivers of the Toyota AE86 chassis in the D1GP today. He began competing in the D1GP in the sixth round in 2002, though he did not get any recognition until round 3 of 2004 when out of nowhere he defeated many well known names to take second place, and first exhibited his jumping drift which took the crowd and judges by storm.

Hibino has always drove the Toyota Corolla Levin since he began and the combination of its light weight and his aggressive driving style make him a formidable opponent. As he carried on in D1GP, he has another Levin which is a 3-door while his N.A. Cream-Beige Levin AE86 is a 2-door coupe. The 3-door Levin is heavily modified, featuring the SR20 engine from a Nissan Silvia which gives a significant performance advantage over the standard engine. Though some of the more hardcore AE86 fans do not like this Nissan transplant, it is fairly common, but he has stuck with the stock AE86 live-axle rear end as some would use a S13 rear end.

In 2007, when he advanced to the finals in the Suzuka round, Hibino purposely swerved into Masao Suenaga's path during the start of their first run and the judges originally placed him as second but he was later disqualified after the tournament finished. He had a decent season but placed 11th overall.

In 2009, Hibino changed to DRoo-P's AE85 which Toshiki Yoshioka had driven until the mid of 2008 for the newly built DRoo-P SC430. The AE85 was heavily changed with a new exterior design and a matte black. He earned his first win at Rd.3 in Okayama alongside Daigo Saito. He placed fifth overall in the series ranking.

In 2010, Hibino picked up the sponsorship with UPGARAGE in collaboration with his main sponsor DRoo-P, which also required the change of his livery to grey and yellow. He earned his 2nd win Rd.5 in Ebisu going against Ken Nomura in the finals. Some would say it was considered a revenge match as Nomura had won at Rd.3 in Ebisu for the 2004 season. He also started to enter Drift Muscle races started by Keiichi Tsuchiya from 2011. He drives the Nissan Silvia S15 instead of the AE86 in the Drift Muscle series.

In 2012, Hibino changed cars from the AE86 to the newer Toyota 86 from AE86. As Dunlop had dropped out of the series, he automatically changed tire sponsors with Falken.

In 2013, Hibino earned his third win at Rd.5 in Huis Ten Bosch. This was also the first victory for a Toyota 86 in the series,

At 2015, Hibino started to drive Toyota Supra and changed to Zestino Tyre. He entered RDS in Russia and won all championship during this year. He also won championship D1 PRIMRING GP in Russia. Hibino's result was 2nd place at D1GP Rd.6 and D1GP WORLD CHAMPIONS. He started to join drift race in China from 2015. His D1GP series ranking was 6th place this year.

Hibino became a member of GULF RACING ZESTINO TIRE from 2017. He changed his car to Honda S2000. Hibino won TANSO Championship at 2017 D1GP TSUKUBA DRIFT Rd.3, D1GP China in Hefei and D1 PRIMRING GP in Russia.

From 2019, Hibino changed his car to Nissan Silvia (S14). The front of this car is designed to look like a Plymouth Barracuda by Rocket Bunny parts.

== Complete Drifting Results ==
Colour	Result
Gold	Winner
Silver	2nd place
Bronze	3rd place
Green	Last 4 [Semi-final]
Blue	Last 8 [Quarter-final]
Purple	Last 16 (16) [1st Tsuiou Round OR Tandem Battle] (Numbers are given to indicate Top 10 finish)
Black	Disqualified (DSQ) (Given to indicate that the driver has been stripped of their position through disqualification)
White	First Round (TAN) [Tansou OR Qualifying Single Runs]
Red	Did not qualify (DNQ)

- When driver's position are highlighted in blue, this indicates either the driver earned 100pt or 100pt tansou (solo run) bonus has been awarded, with the latter being in use for Pre-2005.

=== D1 Grand Prix ===
Year	Entrant	Car	1	2	3	4	5	6	7	8	Position	Points
2002	Dropout Racing	Toyota Corolla Levin AE86	BHH	EBS	SGO	TKB	EBS	SEK; 16	NIK		-	0
2003	Dropout Racing	Toyota Corolla Levin AE86	TKB; TAN	BHH; DNQ	SGO; TAN	FUJ; DNQ	EBS	SEK; DNQ	TKB; DNQ		-	0
2004	Dropout Racing	Mazda RX-7 FD3S	IRW	SGO; DNQ							9	30
2004	Dropout Racing	Toyota Corolla Levin AE86			EBS; 2	APS; 16	ODB; 16	EBS; 5	TKB; 16		9	30
2005	SunRise	Toyota Corolla Levin AE86	IRW; TAN	ODB; DNQ	SGO; 7	APS; 2	EBS; TAN	FUJ; 16	TKB; 16		11	28
2006	SunRise	Toyota Corolla Levin AE86	IRW; 16	SGO; TAN	FUJ; DNQ	APS; DNQ	EBS; TAN	SUZ; 4	FUJ; TAN	IRW; TAN	16	16
2007	SunRise	Toyota Corolla Levin AE86	EBS; 5	FUJ; 8	SUZ; DSQ	SGO; TAN	EBS; 7	APS; TAN	FUJ; 16		11	29
2008	SunRise	Toyota Corolla Levin AE86	EBS; 8	FUJ; TAN	SUZ; 16	OKY; 3	APS; TAN	EBS	FUJ		12	30

=== Russian Drift Series GP ===
Year	Entrant	Car	1	2	3	4	5	6	Position	Points
2019	Fresh Auto	Toyota Supra JZA80	MRW; 11	ATR; 1	NRING; 4	ADM; 5	RRING; 5	SOC; 11	3	907

== Sources ==
- Tetsuya Official Site「hibinotetsuya.com」
- Hibino Tetsuya Channel［YouTube］
- TEAM ZESTINO RACING
- D1 Grand Prix Official Japanese Site
- RDS GP
