= Maze Sea Circuit =

Motor racing circuit in Niigata, Japan

Maze Sea Circuit (日本海間瀬サーキット)
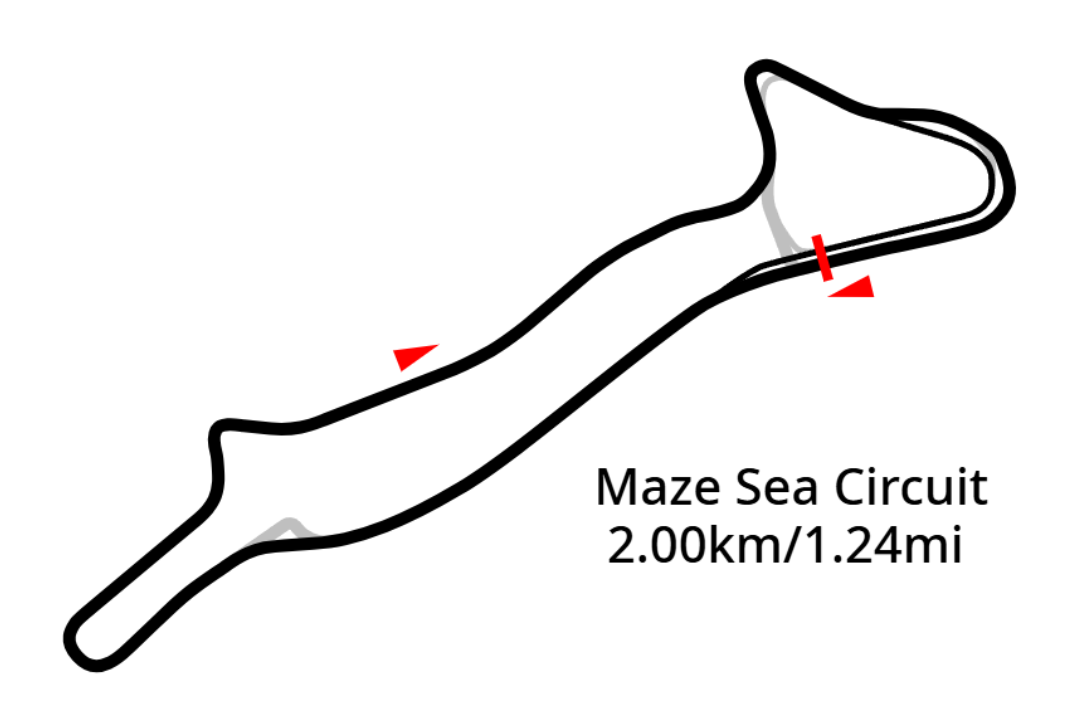
- Full Circuit (1987–present)
- Location: Maze, Nishikan-ku, Niigata-shi, Niigata-ken Japan
- Coordinates: 37°44′41.8″N 138°48′6.3″E
- Opened: 1967; Re-opened:1987
- Closed: 1978
- Architect: Yoshikazu Fujita
- Website: http://www.mazecircuit.jp/

Full Circuit (1967–1978, 1987–present)
- Length: 2.000 km (1.243 mi)
- Turns: 15

Maze Sea Circuit (Japanese: 日本海間瀬サーキット) is a 2.000 km (1.243 mi) Japanese motor racing circuit at Maze, in the Iwamuro neighbourhood of Nishikan-ku, Niigata city, Niigata Prefecture Japan.

== History ==
The circuit was established in 1967 by Dr. Yoshikazu Fujita, a local physician. In 1970, the track was paved and redesigned into a road racing course. Between 1978 and 1987, the track was closed.

When it reopened in 1987, racing was changed to a clockwise direction. The track layout was also realigned to improve safety conditions by adding a chicane.

In September 2008, Round 5 of the D1 Street Legal drifting series was held at the circuit. Round 1 of the 2018 D1 Lights series was also held here.
