= Tsuyoshi Tezuka =

Japanese professional drifting driver (born 1975)

- Nationality: Japan
- Born: 14 December 1975 (age 50)

D1 Grand Prix career
- Debut season: 2001
- Current team: WEINS Toyota Kanagawa X 俺だっ!レーシング
- Former teams: Goodyear Racing with Bee*R, Bee*R Racing
- Wins: 2
- Best finish: 2nd in 2009

Previous series
- D1 Street Legal

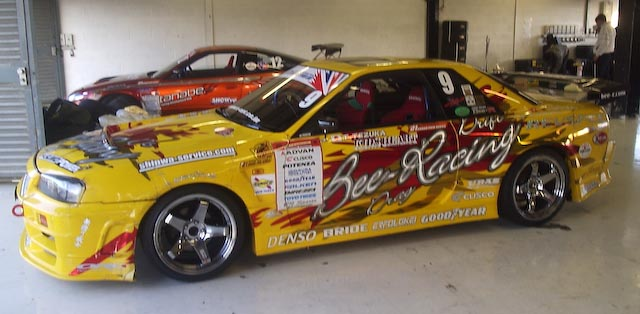
Tezuka's Bee*Racing Skyline B324R

Tsuyoshi Tezuka (手塚 強, Tezuka Tsuyoshi; 14 December 1975, Gifu) is a Japanese professional drifting driver, currently competing in the D1 Grand Prix series for Yokohama TOYOPET X 俺だっ!レーシング.

== Background ==
Tezuka developed a love for cars from an early age, his first was a Toyota Crown but to start with he was more interested in drag racing than drift. That soon changed as he found out how much it cost to make a fast drag car. One of his co-workers were interested in drifting and he decided to give it a go, even though his car was automatic and everyone said it would not work. He got hooked and found out how expensive drifting was often spending more than $800 a month on petrol. He used many different cars over this time from a Nissan Laurel (C33), Toyota Mark II and Toyota Chaser (JZX81) to a Toyota Cresta (JZX90), though all of them were 4-door. He chose these cars as he likes big displacement and big power, also the sound of straight 6 engines.

== Career ==
Tezuka works as the manager at a used car dealership called Kids Heart in the Aichi Prefecture. It is well known largely for the Nissan approved conversion of the Sileighty and many of the cars it sells are sought after by racers. He also runs a car graphics shop and website which he set up called T2 Koubou, as he enjoys working on computers and makes his own websites.

Tezuka started drifting professionally at the first round of the D1 Grand Prix, he was very happy that his family approved of this career choice, even more so when they come to cheer him on. In 2005 he was signed by Bee*Racing a tuning firm renowned for their Nissan Skyline GT-R (R32) known as the B324R. Since then his driving has come along a lot, finishing ninth in the 2006 season, fourth in the 2007 season, and gaining his first win in the third round of the 2008 series.

== Complete Drifting Results ==
Colour	Result
Gold	Winner
Silver	2nd place
Bronze	3rd place
Green	Last 4 [Semi-final]
Blue	Last 8 [Quarter-final]
Purple	Last 16 (16) [1st Tsuiou Round OR Tandem Battle] (Numbers are given to indicate Top 10 finish)
Black	Disqualified (DSQ) (Given to indicate that the driver has been stripped of their position through disqualification)
White	First Round (TAN) [Tansou OR Qualifying Single Runs]
Red	Did not qualify (DNQ)

- When driver's position are highlighted in blue, this indicates either the driver earned 100pt or 100pt tansou (solo run) bonus has been awarded, with the latter being in use for Pre-2005.

=== D1 Grand Prix ===
Year	Entrant	Car	1	2	3	4	5	6	7	8	Position	Points
2001		Toyota Chaser JZX81	EBS; 3								11	20
2001		Toyota Chaser JZX81		NIK; TAN	BHH; 9	EBS; TAN					11	20
2001		Toyota Mark II JZX81					NIK; TAN				11	20
2002		Toyota Mark II JZX81	BHH; 6	EBS; TAN	SGO; TAN	TKB; 8	EBS; DNQ	SEK; TAN	NIK; TAN		20	16
2003		Toyota Mark II JZX81	TKB; DNQ	BHH; DNQ	SGO; DNQ	FUJ; 7	EBS; TAN	SEK; DNQ	TKB; DNQ		19	8
2004		Toyota Mark II JZX81	IRW	SGO; 16	EBS; DNQ	APS; DNQ	ODB; DNQ	EBS; DNQ	TKB; DNQ		-	0
2005	Bee*Racing	Nissan Skyline HCR32	IRW; TAN	ODB; DNQ	SGO; 16	APS; DNQ	EBS; 3	FUJ; 10			14	19
2005	Bee*Racing	Nissan Skyline GT-R BNR32							TKB; TAN		14	19
2006	Bee*Racing	Nissan Skyline GT-R BNR32	IRW; 16	SGO; 16	FUJ; DNQ	APS; 8	EBS; 5	SUZ; TAN	FUJ; 2	IRW; 7	9	49
2007	Bee*Racing	Nissan Skyline GT-R BNR32	EBS; 4	FUJ; 9	SUZ; 8	SGO; 12	EBS; 3	APS; 7	FUJ; 7		4	61
2008	Bee*Racing	Nissan Skyline GT-R BNR32	EBS; 11	FUJ; 3	SUZ; 1	OKY; TAN	APS; 10	EBS	FUJ		5	60

== Sources ==
- JDM Option
- D1 Grand Prix
