= Daigo Saito =

Japanese racing driver

Daigo Saito 斎藤太吾
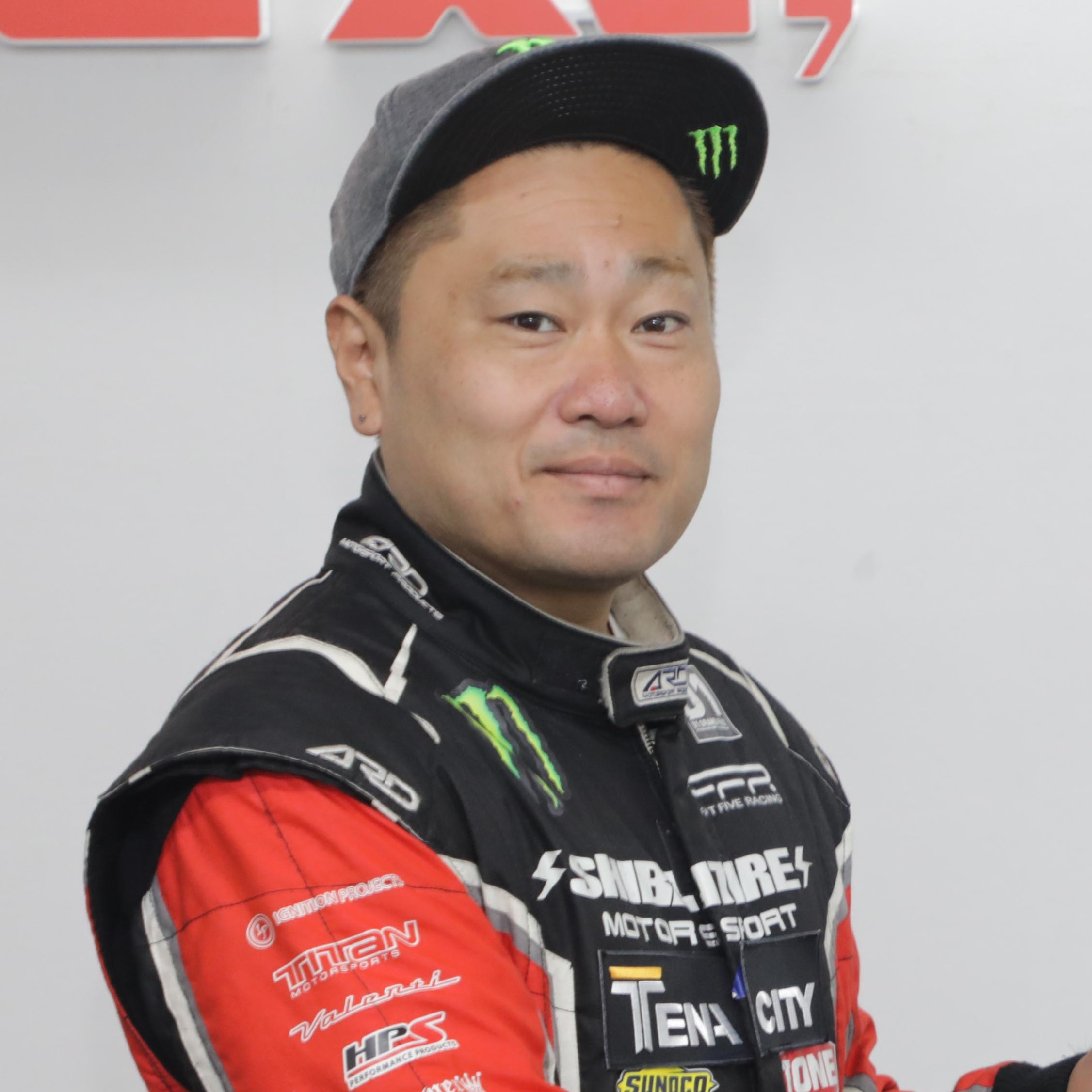
- Daigo Saito in 2024 Taiwan D1 Grand Prix
- Nationality: Japan
- Born: 7 March 1980 (age 46) Saitama Prefecture, Japan

D1 Grand Prix career
- Debut season: 2004
- Current team: Fat Five Racing
- Car number: 87
- Former teams: TMAR; Team 22 Nino; Fnatz Professional Garage
- Wins: 20
- Best finish: 1st in 2008, 2016

Previous series
- 2006 2012–2013, 2015 2018–2019, 2021: D1 Street Legal; Formula Drift; Russian Drift Series

Championship titles
- 2008 2011 2011 2012 2012 2013 2016 2016: D1 Grand Prix; D1 Grand Prix (Tanso); Formula D Asia; Formula D Asia; Formula D Formula D Asia; D1 Grand Prix (Tanso); D1 Grand Prix

Daigo Saito (斎藤 太吾, Saitō Daigo; 7 March 1980, Saitama) is a Japanese professional drifting driver, currently competing in the D1 Grand Prix series and Formula Drift Japan. He formerly competed in Formula DRIFT USA and World Championship series for Achilles Radial. He is the first and only driver to win the two drifting majors, D1GP in 2008 and 2016 and Formula D in 2012. He is widely regarded as one of the greatest drift drivers of all time.

Saito has won the D1 Grand Prix Championship in 2008 and 2016, and additionally winning its Tanso (Solo Run) Championship in 2011 and 2016. Abroad, he has won the 2012 Formula D Championship, and the Formula D Asia Championship for three consecutive years in 2011, 2012, and 2013.

== Career ==
From an early age, Saito gained an appreciation for motorbikes, and motorbike racing, a hobby and sport his Father had exposed him to. Saito then gained his motorcycle license at the age of 16. One evening, when Saito was going for a ride on his motorbike with his friends, he stumbled upon a drift car meeting in the hills of Karuizawa. There he saw a white Mercedes-Benz saloon drifting. From then on he wanted to take part in drifting, and drift a saloon-style car. Upon turning 18, he gained his drivers license, though his father did not want him to take part in drifting. His Father bought him a Mini Cooper as his first car, a vehicle that is generally not capable of performing the high-speed maneuvers required for drifting. Saito attempted to drift the vehicle anyways and ended up getting it written off in an accident. He then bought a Nissan Silvia S13 without asking for permission from his parents. Saito immediately began practicing. His first practice session lasted 36 straight hours, with Saito only stopping for food and fuel. Saito began to develop his skills in the vehicle, but crashed it only a few weeks later. In 2005, Saito won the title for privateers.

=== D1 Grand Prix ===
Saito started competing in the D1 Grand Prix in the third round of the 2004 season in his Toyota Mark II JZX90. Following his crash with Kawabata in Fuji in 2007, he replaced the JZX90 with JZX100 Mark II.

Saito kept improving at a steady pace the following year and won the 2008 D1 Grand Prix championship for the first time. At around this time Daigo worked at his parents' preschool as the driver.

In 2011, Saito became D1GP first ever solo run champion, driving a Toyota JZX100 Chaser. The following year due to his participation in Formula Drift in USA, he missed several D1GP rounds, but he was still a contender for the championship until the last round where he lost the title to Nobushige Kumakubo.

In 2013, Saito's participation is the same like the previous year, he started his own shop called Fat Five Racing but before the final round of the season his garage where he kept his car burned down and force him to borrow his staff car for the final round.

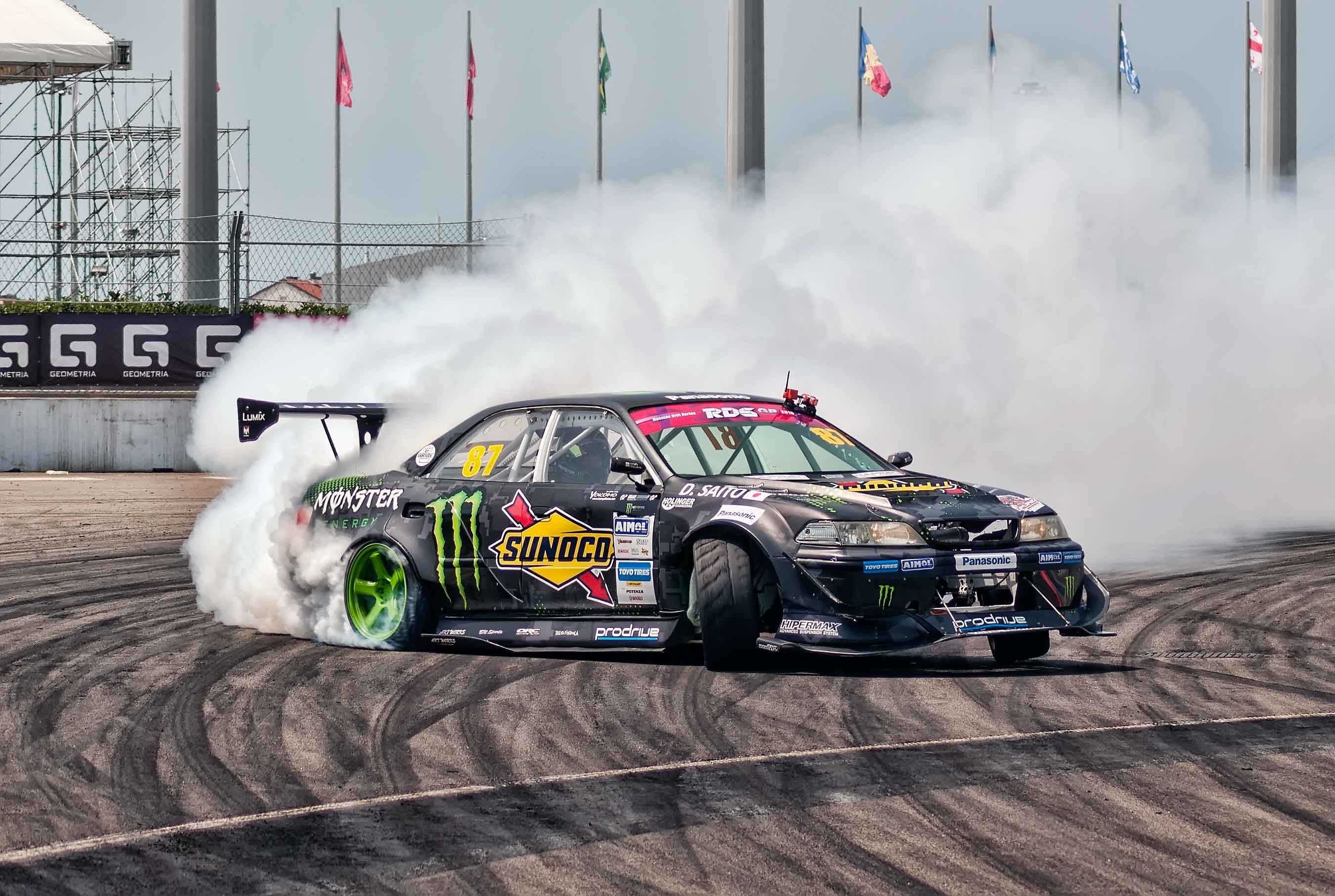
Saito drifting his Toyota JZX100 Mark II

In 2014, he used a Lexus IS250C for D1GP as he built a JZX100 Mark II and JZX100 Chaser at a garage in his own house replacing the one that caught fire in 2013. In Ebisu he finally debuted the Mark II.

In 2015, Saito worked on the first Drift specification Lamborghini Murcielago. He also started to be sponsored by Monster Energy. He finished the season as the championship runner-up with three event wins.

In 2016, Saito now with Wanli as tire supplier. The combination worked very well as Daigo won the first two opening rounds of the season beating the defending champion Masato Kawabata on both occasions. However due to how his Mark II was built, the car was banned due to regulations, forcing him to switch to the JZX100 Chaser. He won three more rounds and clinched the 2016 D1 Grand Prix championship with a round to spare. His 5 wins in a single season is a record that only Masanori Kohashi has been able to equal in 2021.

In 2017 for the first time he would be driving a non-Japanese car in form of a Chevrolet C6 Corvette GT3 powered with a LS engine. In only its third outing he managed to get the car to the final and grab a win later in Ebisu in what would be his only win with the Corvette. He finished the season in third place.

Since 2019, Saito drove a Toyota GR Supra in D1GP. He planned to enter Eurofighter BMW E92 M3, vbut he was contacted by Toyota to use the newly released GR Supra and grabbed his first win with the chassis in 2021 in the third GR Supra he make.

In 2022, Saito alongside his teammate Hokuto Matsuyama compete in Formula Drift Japan with an identical Toyota GR86 and change tire supplier to Yokohama while continue his D1GP campaign with the GR Supra. However at the end of 2022, TMAR was disbanded.

At 2023 Tokyo Auto Salon, it was announced that Saito would be using Toyo Tires for D1GP. However, the deal was aborted due to unknown reason and he participate with Goodride on first two round before using Shibatire for the rest of the season.

=== Formula Drift ===
In 2012, Saito joined the Formula Drift series in the Achilles Radial Lexus SC430 powered by a Toyota 2JZ engine. He achieved his first podium finish in his first event of the series at Long Beach. He followed this win up with a third-place finish in Round 2 at Atlanta, and then a first-place finish at Round 3 in Palm Beach and a fourth-place finish in Round 4 at Wall Speedway. He won the 2012 Formula D championship in his debut season and was rookie of the year after winning first place at Irwindale, in Round 7.

As part of the Achilles Radial Drift Team, Saito's car was maintained and transported by Bridges Racing.

Saito finished in third place during his second season in Formula DRIFT USA. He won three rounds (Atlanta, New Jersey & Irwindale) and second place at West Palm Beach. A crash during practice at Seattle and vehicle issues in Texas effectively removed him from the chance of winning back-to-back championships.

Saito debuted a 1,200 hp Nissan GT-R in April 2015 at the Formula DRIFT Streets of Long Beach event, and campaigned the car for the 2015 Formula DRIFT USA season. The GT-R was built in partnership with tuning sponsor HKS.

Saito did not participate in Formula Drift 2016, concentrating (and winning) on D1 Grand Prix series instead. He did the same in 2017.

Saito planned to return to Formula Drift in 2020 and even already completed and shipped a 2JZ-powered Toyota GT86 to USA to be used in competition but due to the COVID-19 pandemic, he had to abort the plan and sending back the car to Japan the following year.

=== Other series ===
In 2018, Saito won the rear-wheel drive class at the Gymkhana Grid. He also competed in Russian Drift Series with his JZX100 Mark II and finished the season as runner-up. Due to his participation in Russia, he was unable to compete full season in D1GP.

== Legacy ==
As the first and only driver to win both drifting majors, D1 Grand Prix in 2008 and 2016 and Formula Drift in 2012, Saito is recognized internationally for his contribution to the sport of drifting. His further achievements as Formula Drift Asia champion for three consecutive years from 2011 to 2013 and D1 Grand Prix Tanso (Solo Run) champion in 2011 and 2016, also added to his international impact.

Saito starred in a video entitled "Battle Drift" in 2015 drifting his Lamborghini Murciélago drift car, alongside Vaughn Gittin Jr. in his Ford Mustang RTR, which went viral and gained over 40 million views. The video was produced and released by both drivers' shared sponsor Monster Energy, and filmed as a touge drift run in Niigata, Japan at an abandoned Russian village.

=== The "Daigo Effect" ===
With his entrance into Formula D in 2012 and subsequent rookie season championship win, he was noted for changing the judging criteria and vehicle field significantly - a phenomenon coined as "the Daigo effect" in Formula D press. "The Daigo effect" was defined as the significant change in horsepower in drift cars and the change in tandem judging criteria, with Saito's debut in Formula Drift. Up until 2012, the majority of Formula D teams fielded cars with around 500 horsepower. Saito, on the other hand, fielded a 1,200 horsepower Lexus SC430 powered by a heavily tuned Toyota 2JZ-GTE. This promoted an aggressive driving style that created a noticeable advantage in competition. Similarly, Saito's skills in tandem drifting, which form an important part of the judging criteria in Japan, demonstrated that consistent and close proximity drifting should be a predominant judging criterion. After his rookie championship win, the majority of teams worked to increase power output by hundreds of horsepower in the following 2013 season.

== Complete drifting results ==
Colour	Result
Gold	Winner
Silver	2nd place
Bronze	3rd place
Green	Last 4 [Semi-final]
Blue	Last 8 [Quarter-final]
Purple	Last 16 (16) [1st Tsuiou Round OR Tandem Battle] (Numbers are given to indicate Top 10 finish)
Black	Disqualified (DSQ) (Given to indicate that the driver has been stripped of their position through disqualification)
White	First Round (TAN) [Tansou OR Qualifying Single Runs]
Red	Did not qualify (DNQ)

- When driver's position are highlighted in blue, this indicates either the driver earned 100pt or 100pt tansou (solo run) bonus has been awarded, with the latter being in use for Pre-2005.

=== D1 Grand Prix ===
Year	Entrant	Car	1	2	3	4	5	6	7	8	Position	Points
2004		Toyota Mark II JZX90	IRW	SGO	EBS; TAN	APS; TAN	ODB; DNQ	EBS; DNQ	TKB; 16		-	0
2005		Toyota Mark II JZX90	IRW	ODB; DNQ	SGO; TAN	APS; DNQ	EBS; DNQ	FUJ; DNQ	TKB; 16		32	1
2006		Toyota Mark II JZX90	IRW	SGO; 5	FUJ; 16	APS; 16	EBS; 16	SUZ; 16	FUJ; TAN		14	24
2006		Toyota Chaser JZX100								IRW; 9	14	24
2007		Toyota Mark II JZX90	EBS; 15	FUJ; 7	SUZ; TAN						7	41
2007		Toyota Mark II JZX100				SGO; TAN	EBS; 6	APS; 6	FUJ; 6		7	41
2008	Team 22	Toyota Mark II JZX100	EBS; 14	FUJ; 2	SUZ; 4	OKY; 4	APS; 1	EBS; 7	FUJ; 4		1	114
2009	週刊コミックバンチ DRIFTプロジェクト	Toyota Mark II JZX100	EBS; 3	APS; 7	OKY; 1	OKY; 12	EBS; 10	EBS; 11	FUJ; 15	FUJ; 9	8	82
2010	フナッツ	Toyota Mark II JZX100	ODB; TAN	APS; 2	FUJ; 7	OKY; TAN	EBS; 4	EBS; 7	FUJ; 3		6	79
2011	プレミアムジャパン with ダイゴ	Toyota Mark II JZX100	ODB; 3	ODB; 9	APS; 2	SUZ; 1	OKY; 2	EBS; 4	EBS; 1	FUJ; 6	2	207
2012	ダイゴ	Toyota Mark II JZX100	ODB; 1	SUZ; 2				CEN; 1				
2019	FAT FIVE RACING	Toyota GR Supra A90	TKB	TKB	TKC	TKC	EBS	EBS	APS		14	41
2020	FAT FIVE RACING	Toyota GR Supra A90	16	EBS; 2	EBS; 13	APS	APS	EBS; 13	TKB	TKB	9	64
2021	FAT FIVE RACING	Toyota GR Supra A90									12	66

=== D1 Street Legal ===
Year	Entrant	Car	1	2	3	4	5	6	7	Position	Points
2006		Toyota Chaser JZX100	SEK	EBS; TSU	SGO; 8	FUJ; 5	APS; 6	EBS; TSU	SEK	10	31

=== Formula Drift ===
Year	Entrant	Car	1	2	3	4	5	6	7	Position	Points
2012	Bridges Racing/Achilles Radial	Lexus SC430 UZZ40	FDLB; 3	FDATL; 3	FDPB; 1	FDNJ; 4	FDNW; Top 8	FDLV; Top 8	FDIRW; 1	1	548.50
2013	Bridges Racing/Achilles Radial	Lexus SC430 UZZ40	FDLB; Top 16	FDATL; 1	FDPB; 2	FDNJ; 1	FDNW; Top 32	FDTX; Top 32	FDIRW; 1	3	510.50
2014	Bridges Racing/Achilles Radial	Lexus SC430 UZZ40	FDLB; Top 32	FDATL; Top 8	FDMIA; DNQ	FDNJ; Top 32	FDNW; DNQ	FDTX; Top 16	FDIRW; 1	14	224.00

=== Russian Drift Series GP ===
Year	Entrant	Car	1	2	3	4	5	6	7	Position	Points
2018		Toyota Mark II JZX100	MRW; 3	ATR	NRING; 3	SOC; 4	SOC; 3	RRING; 4	PRM; 2	2	1021
2019	AIMOL RACING RUSSIA	Toyota Altezza	MRW; 9	ATR; 6	NRING; 6	ADM; 16	RRING; 14	SOC; 5		8	718
2021	AIMOL RACING RUSSIA	Toyota GR Supra A90	MRW; 27	NRING; DNQ	IGORA	ATR	RRING	ADM	SOC		41

== Sources ==
- JDM Option
- D1 Grand Prix
- Formula Drift
- RDS GP
