= Tomokazu Hirota =

Japanese drifter (born 1976)

Tomokazu Hirota is a Japanese drifter. He competes in D1gp, and has competed in D1 U.S.A . He drives for the Vertex T-and-E team Japan and currently uses a Lexus GS350 built by Team A.S Mori.

Hirota was born on 20 August 1976 in Kanagawa Prefecture, Japan. Before He entered D1GP in 2001 Tomokazu was in a Japanese street team called Night Walkers. In 2001, he chose a Toyota Verossa for his D1 competition car. This was an awkward choice to everyone else yet its 1JZ GTE was more than capable of delivering power in a D1 level. The Vertex promotional Verossa can be seen in JDM insider Volume 2 drifting in Yokohama before it entered D1; this is Tomokazu's car, as it can be distinguished by the Night Walkers banner above the windscreen.

== D1GP ==
Hirota drove the Verossa for nine years in D1GP before changing to a Lexus GS350. He drove the Verossa to one second-place position at Round 4.Okayama in 2008. The reason for his choice of unusual car is not clear but he has been named "D1's best Verossa Drifter" by Kiiechi Tsuchiya at previous D1 events.

== See also ==
- 2008 D1 Grand Prix season
