= Yoshinori Koguchi =

Japanese professional drifting driver (born 1969)

- Nationality: Japan
- Born: 2 February 1969 (age 57) Tochigi, Japan

D1 Grand Prix career
- Debut season: 2001
- Current team: Dunlop Tyres
- Wins: 1
- Best finish: 10th in 2007

Previous series
- (previous series with line breaks)

Championship titles
- (championship titles)

Yoshinori Koguchi (古口 美範, Koguchi Yoshinori; 2 February 1969 in Tochigi) is a Japanese professional drifting driver, who competes in the D1 Grand Prix series for Dunlop Tyres and Koguchi Power.

Like many of the other D1 drivers, Koguchi owns his own tuning garage called Koguchi Power. Yoshinori does all of the work on his car himself. He has a following of Nissan 180SX enthusiasts as he is one of the top 180SX drivers, also his car is the same one that he started out in. His car uses mostly off the shelf parts. His nickname is 'Emperor'.

Koguchi has been competing in D1 since it began in 2001 and scored points in his Nissan 180SX in the first three seasons. He then switched to a Nissan Silvia S15 sponsored by tuning firm High Power Improvement, he did not do well in the car or the Toyota Chaser he used after. So in 2007, he changed back to his 180SX and has done well. Usually if he makes it into the top 16 he will score big points, gaining his first win in round 2 of the 2008 season.

== Drifting results ==
| Colour | Result |
|---|---|
| Gold | Winner |
| Silver | 2nd place |
| Bronze | 3rd place |
| Green | Last 4 [Semi-final] |
| Blue | Last 8 [Quarter-final] |
| Purple | Last 16 (16) [1st Tsuiou Round OR Tandem Battle] (Numbers are given to indicate Top 10 finish) |
| Black | Disqualified (DSQ) (Given to indicate that the driver has been stripped of their position through disqualification) |
| White | First Round (TAN) [Tansou OR Qualifying Single Runs] |
| Red | Did not qualify (DNQ) |

- When driver's position are highlighted in blue, this indicates either the driver earned 100pt or 100pt tansou (solo run) bonus has been awarded, with the latter being in use for Pre-2005.

=== D1 Grand Prix ===
| Year | Entrant | Car | 1 | 2 | 3 | 4 | 5 | 6 | 7 | 8 | Position | Points |
|---|---|---|---|---|---|---|---|---|---|---|---|---|
| 2001 | Koguchi Power | Nissan 180SX RPS13 | EBS; 8 | NIK | BHH; TAN | EBS; TAN | NIK; 8 | | | | 16 | 12 |
| 2002 | Koguchi Power | Nissan 180SX RPS13 | BHH; TAN | EBS; TAN | SGO; TAN | TKB; TAN | EBS; 8 | SEK; DNQ | NIK; 5 | | 17 | 18 |
| 2003 | Koguchi Power | Nissan 180SX RPS13 | TKB; TAN | BHH; TAN | SGO; TAN | FUJ; DNQ | EBS; 9 | SEK | TKB; DNQ | | 22 | 4 |
| 2004 | HPI | Nissan 180SX RPS13 | IRW; TAN | | | | | | | | - | 0 |
| 2004 | HPI | Nissan Silvia S15 | | SGO; 16 | EBS; TAN | APS; DNQ | ODB; DNQ | EBS; DNQ | TKB; DNQ | | - | 0 |
| 2005 | HPI | Nissan Silvia S15 | IRW; TAN | ODB; DNQ | SGO; DNQ | APS; DNQ | EBS; DNQ | FUJ; DNQ | TKB; DNQ | | - | 0 |
| 2006 | | Toyota Chaser JZX100 | IRW; TAN | SGO; DNQ | FUJ; DNQ | APS; TAN | EBS; DNQ | SUZ; DNQ | FUJ; DNQ | IRW; TAN | - | 0 |
| 2007 | Koguchi Power | Nissan 180SX RPS13 | EBS; DNQ | FUJ; 5 | SUZ | SGO; TAN | EBS; DNQ | APS; DNQ | FUJ; 2 | | 10 | 31 |
| 2008 | Dunlop Tyres | Nissan 180SX RPS13 | EBS; TAN | FUJ; 1 | SUZ; TAN | OKY; 8 | APS; 16 | EBS | FUJ; 5 | | 11 | 50 |

== Sources ==
- D1 Grand Prix
