= 2018 D1 Grand Prix series =

Motor racing competition

The 2018 D1 Grand Prix series is the eighteenth season for the D1 Grand Prix series. The season began on March 31 at Maishima Sports Island in Osaka, and ended on November 3 at the Odaiba Tokyo Street Course. This season also marked the commencement of the new D1 Lights series, with the preseason match on January 20, at Nikko Circuit, with the season ending on December 1 at the same venue.

== Teams and drivers ==
Tire	Team	Car	No.	Drivers	Round(s)
Dunlop	Pacific Racing Team	Nissan ER34	3	(Japan) Ken Nomura	1-8
Dunlop	Pacific Racing Team	Nissan S14	14	(Japan) Tomohiro Murayama	1-8
Dunlop	Hirano Tire	Toyota JZX100	22	(Japan) Kenji Kiguchi	1-2, 5-7
Dunlop	広島トヨタ team DROO-P	Toyota ZN6	33	(Japan) Kazuki Hayashi	1-8
Dunlop	Tanabe SSR Team	Toyota JZX100	38	(Japan) Tadahiro Fukada	1-3
Dunlop	Fat Five Racing	Toyota JZX100	45	(Japan) Shingo Hatanaka	1-8
Dunlop	Silky House OTG	Toyota ZN6	60	(Japan) Youichi Imamura	1-2
Dunlop	広島トヨタ team DROO-P	Toyota AE85	99	(Japan) Kazuya Matsukawa	1-8
Goodride	adidas a-unit G-meister	Nissan S15	16	(Japan) Koji Yamaguchi	1-8
Goodride	GARAGE わいず	Nissan PS13	17	(Japan) Teruaki Shimoda	3
Goodride	北九州 MSR	Nissan S15	31	(Japan) Masaru Fuchigami	3, 5-7
Goodride	MMM Chroma Racing	Ferrari 550	42	(Japan) Kunihiko Teramachi	-
Goodride	Nichiei Racing	Nissan S15	61	(Chinese Taipei) Feng Jen-Chih	1-2
Goodride	Moty's West Auto	Toyota JZX100	73	(Japan) Ikuo Saito	1-3, 5
Goodride	Fat Five Racing	Chevrolet C6	87	(Japan) Daigo Saito	1-2, 5
Goodride	TCP Magic	Mazda FD3S	88	(Japan) Manabu Fujinaka	1-2
Goodyear	AST	Toyota ZN6	28	(Japan) Masayoshi Tokita	1-8
Goodyear	Sunoco	Lexus GSE20	48	(Japan) Tomoyuki Kitashiba	1-3, 5
Goodyear	Origin Labo.	Nissan RPS13	81	(Japan) Kazuya Bai	1-8
Goodyear	Team Kunny'z	Toyota GRX130	92	(Japan) Kuniaki Takahashi	4-7
Nankang	かいとりちゃん オルビスレーシング	Nissan S15	46	(Japan) Yoshitatsu Kaneda	6-7
Nankang	D-MAX	Nissan S15	70	(Japan) Masashi Yokoi	1-8
Nankang	D-MAX	Nissan S15	75	(Japan) Akira Hirajima	1-2
Toyo	Seimi Style Drift	Nissan S15	2	(Japan) Seimi Tanaka	5-8
Toyo	Dixcel	Nissan S15	6	(Japan) Akinori Utsumi	1-8
Toyo	Team RE雨宮 K&N	Mazda FD3S	7	(Japan) Yukio Matsui	1-8
Toyo	Fun Style Racing	Toyota AE86	19	(Japan) Noboru Morita	6-7
Toyo	Samurai Kanto	Mazda FC3S	21	(Japan) Takahiro Imamura	4-7
Toyo	Team C.M.Feeling	Nissan S15	23	(Japan) Mitsuru Murakami	1-3
Toyo	Do-Luck	Toyota ZN6	32	(Thailand) Daychapon Toyingcharoen	1-8
Toyo	Glion Trust Racing	Nissan R35	35	(Japan) Masato Kawabata	1-8
Toyo	TMS Racing Team	Toyota JZX100	36	(Japan) Kazumi Takahashi	1-8
Toyo	Glion Trust Racing	Nissan R35	39	(Japan) Masao Suenaga	1-8
Toyo	Used Parts Tadokoro	Toyota AE86	43	(Japan) Yoshifumi Tadokoro	1-7
Toyo	Wisteria	Nissan RPS13	66	(Japan) Hideyuki Fujino	1-8
Toyo	Team Julius	Nissan RPS13	84	(Hong Kong) Charles Ng	1-8
TRI-ACE	Team Mori パーツオフ	Toyota JZX100	30	(Japan) Tetsuro Nakada	1-8
TRI-ACE	Team Mori パーツオフ	Toyota JZX100	52	(Japan) Yusuke Kitaoka	1-8
Zestino	Yuke's Team Orange	Nissan S15	4	(Japan) Masanori Kohashi	1-8
Zestino	Navigate KRC	Nissan S14	5	(Japan) Takatoshi Imamaeda	1-2
Zestino	K'SPEC SunRISE Racing	Honda AP1	8	(Japan) Tetsuya Hibino	1-7
Zestino	Yuke's Team Orange	Nissan S15	9	(Japan) Naoto Suenaga	1-8
Zestino	Team ZSS Racing	Nissan S15	15	(Japan) Katsuhiro Ueo	1-8
Zestino	R Magic H.D.O D1 Racing	Mazda NA6CE	77	(Japan) Teruyoshi Iwai	1-7
Zestino	Team Vertex Digicam	Toyota JZZ30	78	(Japan) Takahiro Ueno	1-8
N/A	Origin Labo. Sunoco	Nissan S14	12	(Japan) Yoshikazu Kawakami	1-2

== Schedule ==
2018 D1 Grand Prix race locations

Round	Venue	Date	Winner	Report
1	Maishima Sports Island, Osaka Prefecture	March 31	(Japan) Shingo Hatanaka	Report
2	Maishima Sports Island, Osaka Prefecture	April 1	(Japan) Hideyuki Fujino	Report
3	Autopolis, Ōita Prefecture	April 14–15	(Japan) Masashi Yokoi	Report
4	Tokachi International Speedway, Hokkaido Prefecture	June 9–10	(Japan) Masashi Yokoi	Report
5	Tsukuba Circuit, Ibaraki Prefecture	July 21–22	(Japan) Yukio Matsui	Report
6	Ebisu Circuit, Fukushima Prefecture	August 25	(Japan) Masanori Kohashi	Report
7	Ebisu Circuit, Fukushima Prefecture	August 26	(Japan) Masashi Yokoi	Report
8	Odaiba, Tokyo Metropolis	November 3	(Japan) Akinori Utsumi	Report

== Drivers' rankings ==
=== D1GP ===
Pos.	Driver	Car	Rd.1	Rd.2	Rd.3	Rd.4	Rd.5	Rd.6	Rd.7	Rd.8	Total
1	(Japan) Masashi Yokoi	Nissan S15	20	9	30	30	DSQ	25	30	22	166
2	(Japan) Masato Kawabata	Nissan R35	25	12	22	22	17	17	20	11	134
3	(Japan) Naoto Suenaga	Nissan S15	11	16	25	25	22	DSQ	7	12	118
4	(Japan) Masao Suenaga	Nissan R35		22	20	12	1	16	15	25	111
4	(Japan) Yusuke Kitaoka	Toyota JZX100	22	25	1	1	7	20	16	20	111
6	(Japan) Hideyuki Fujino	Nissan RPS13	17	30	17	11	20	9	DSQ	6	110
7	(Japan) Yukio Matsui	Mazda FD3S	6	17	1	1	30	12	22	16	104
8	(Japan) Shingo Hatanaka	Toyota JZX100	30	11	16	17	1	1	11	1	87
9	(Japan) Akinori Utsumi	Nissan S15	7		12			11	17	30	77
10	(Japan) Katsuhiro Ueo	Nissan S15	16	10	15	6	16	1		10	74
11	(Thailand) Daychapon Toyingcharoen	Toyota ZN6	15	1		10	25	1	9	8	69
12	(Japan) Takahiro Ueno	Toyota JZZ30		1	14	20	9	10	1	9	64
13	(Japan) Masanori Kohashi	Nissan S15		DSQ	1	9	1	30	8	14	63
14	(Hong Kong) Charles Ng	Nissan RPS13	10	5	5		12	14	1	15	62
15	(Japan) Seimi Tanaka	Nissan S15					14	8	14	17	53
16	(Japan) Kazuya Bai	Nissan RPS13		20	11	1	11	1		1	45
17	(Japan) Tetsuro Nakada	Toyota JZX100		14	10	1	8			5	38
17	(Japan) Kazumi Takahashi	Toyota JZX100	12	1		14			10	1	38
19	(Japan) Koji Yamaguchi	Nissan S15				7	15	5	5	1	33
20	(Japan) Masayoshi Tokita	Toyota ZN6		15	7	1		1	1	7	32
21	(Japan) Tomohiro Murayama	Nissan S14			8	1	1	6	12	1	29
22	(Japan) Kazuki Hayashi	Toyota ZN6			9	15				1	25
23	(Japan) Kazuya Matsukawa	Toyota AE85	8		1	5	1	7	1	1	24
24	(Japan) Ken Nomura	Nissan ER34	14	1			6		1	1	23
25	(Japan) Tetsuya Hibino	Honda AP1	1		1	16		1	1		20
26	(Japan) Kuniaki Takahashi	Toyota GRX130				1		15	1		17
27	(Japan) Kenji Kiguchi	Toyota JZX100	5	1			10				16
28	(Japan) Takatoshi Imamaeda	Nissan S14	9	6							15
29	(Japan) Yoshifumi Tadokoro	Toyota AE86	1	1	1	8					11
30	(Japan) Tomoyuki Kitashiba	Lexus GSE20		1	6		1				8
30	(Japan) Youichi Imamura	Toyota ZN6	1	7							8
32	(Japan) Yoshitatsu Kaneda	Nissan S15							6		6
32	(Japan) Ikuo Saito	Toyota JZX100		1			5				6
34	(Japan) Teruyoshi Iwai	Mazda NA6CE	1		1	1		1	1		5
35	(Japan) Daigo Saito	Chevrolet C6	1				1				2
35	(Japan) Mitsuru Murakami	Nissan S15	1		1						2
37	(Japan) Masaru Fuchigami	Nissan S15					1				1
37	(Japan) Akira Hirajima	Nissan S15	1								1
37	(Chinese Taipei) Feng Jen Chih	Nissan S15	1								1
