= 2021 D1 Grand Prix series =

The 2021 Gran Turismo D1 Grand Prix series was the twenty-first season of D1 Grand Prix started on April 24 at Okuibuki Motopark and ended on November 21 at Ebisu Circuit.

Masanori Kohashi was the defending champion.

== Teams and Drivers ==
Team	No	Driver	Machine	Tires	Round
LINGLONG TIRE DRIFT Team ORANGE	4	(Japan) Masanori Kohashi	Nissan Silvia (S15)	Linglong	All
LINGLONG TIRE DRIFT Team ORANGE	9	(Japan) Naoto Suenaga	Nissan Silvia (S15)	Linglong	All
NANKANG TIRE DRIFT TEAM D-MAX	70	(Japan) Masashi Yokoi	Nissan Silvia (S15)	Nankang	All
NANKANG TIRE DRIFT TEAM D-MAX	46	(Japan) Masao Suenaga	Nissan Silvia (S15)	Nankang	All
Team TOYO TIRES DRIFT	66	(Japan) Hideyuki Fujino	Toyota 86 (ZN6)	Toyo Tires	All
Team TOYO TIRES DRIFT	90	(Japan) Masato Kawabata	Toyota GR Supra (A90)	Toyo Tires	All
MUGEN PLUS team ALIVE VALINO	99	(Japan) Naoki Nakamura	Nissan Silvia (S15)	Valino	All
TEAM SAILUN TIRE	2	(Japan) Seimi Tanaka	Nissan Silvia (S15)	Sailun	All
TEAM SAILUN TIRE	6	(Japan) Akinori Utsumi	Nissan Silvia (S15)	Sailun	All
FAT FIVE RACING	87	(Japan) Daigo Saito	Toyota GR Supra (A90)	Sailun	1-2,7-10,5-6
FAT FIVE RACING	77	(Japan) Hokuto Matsuyama	Toyota GR Supra (A90)	Toyo Tires	All
Team RE雨宮 K&N	7	(Japan) Yukio Matsui	Mazda RX-7 (FD3S)	Toyo Tires	All
TEAM VERTEX SAILUN TIRE	78	(Japan) Takahiro Ueno	Lexus RC (GSC10)	Sailun	1-7,9-10
VALINO	15	(Japan) Katsuhiro Ueo	Nissan Silvia (S15)	Valino	All
TEAM MORI	52	(Japan) Yusuke Kitaoka	Toyota Mark II (JZX100)	Linglong	All
横浜トヨペット SAILUN 俺だっ！	91	(Japan) Shingo Hatanaka	Toyota GR Supra (A90)	Sailun	All
TEAM SHIBATA SAILUN TIRE	31	(Japan) Koudai Sobagiri	Infiniti Q60 (Q60)	Sailun	All
RS WATANABE SPEED MASTER BUY NOW JAPAN	43	(Japan) Yoshifumi Tadokoro	Toyota Sprinter Trueno (AE86)	Toyo Tires	All
RS WATANABE SPEED MASTER BUY NOW JAPAN	51	(Japan) Teruyoshi Iwai	Mazda RX-7 (FC3S)	Vitour	All
alpinestars LINGLONG G-MEISTER	16	(Japan) Koji Yamaguchi	Nissan Silvia (S15)	Linglong	All
alpinestars LINGLONG G-MEISTER	79	(Japan) Kojiro Mekuwa	Nissan 180SX (RPS13)	Linglong	All
TMS RACING TEAM SAILUN TIRE	36	(Japan) Kazumi Takahashi	BMW 3 Series (E92)	Sailun	All
VITOUR TIRE & SPEED MASTER	27	(Japan) Takeshi Mogi	Nissan Silvia (S15)	Vitour	All
Team M2 Racing	33	(Japan) Shigehisa Sasayama	Toyota Chaser	Valino	All
Team M2 Racing	25	(Japan) Masataka Kawashima	Toyota GR Supra (A90)	Toyo Tires	1-2,7-10,5-6
AUTO-TEC-RACING	19	(Japan) Kentaro Kawai	Toyota Chaser	Sailun	All
MSR.kitakyushu	17	(Japan) Masaru Fuchigami	Nissan Silvia (S15)	Sailun	All
Team CM Feeling	23	(Japan) Mitsuru Murakami	Nissan Silvia (S15)	Toyo Tires	1-2,7-10,5-6
OS-GIKEN SUNOCO	48	(Japan) Tomoyuki Kitashiba	Toyota 86 (ZN6)	Goodride	9-10
GP SPORTS	56	(Japan) Takahiro Mori	Nissan 180SX (RPS13)	Vitour	All
Team BOOSTAR	69	(Japan) Ryusei Akiba	Nissan Silvia (S15)	Valino	7-8,5-6
GARAGE わいず	76	(Japan) Teruaki Shimoda	Nissan Silvia (S13)	Sailun	9-10
PEACE WORKS 男気 DRIFT Racing	84	(Japan) Masakazu Hashi	Nissan Silvia (S15)	Valino	All

Source : 2021 D1GP Drivers

== Schedule ==
Round	Venue	Date	Winner	
Round	Venue	Date	Single Run	Follow-up
1	Okuibuki Motorpark, Shiga Prefecture	April 24	Hokuto Matsuyama	Daigo Saito
2	Okuibuki Motorpark, Shiga Prefecture	April 25	Hokuto Matsuyama	Masashi Yokoi
3	Tsukuba Circuit, Ibaraki Prefecture	June 26	Naoki Nakamura	Akinori Utsumi
4	Tsukuba Circuit, Ibaraki Prefecture	June 27	Yukio Matsui	Masanori Kohashi
5	Okuibuki Motorpark, Shiga Prefecture	October 2	Koudai Sobagiri	Naoki Nakamura
6	Okuibuki Motorpark, Shiga Prefecture	October 3	Naoki Nakamura	Naoki Nakamura
7	(Ōita Prefecture) Autopolis, Oita Prefecture	October 30	Naoki Nakamura	Yukio Matsui
8	(Ōita Prefecture) Autopolis, Oita Prefecture	October 31	Naoki Nakamura	Naoki Nakamura
9	Ebisu Circuit, Fukushima Prefecture	November 20	Masashi Yokoi	Naoto Suenaga
10	Ebisu Circuit, Fukushima Prefecture	November 21	Masashi Yokoi	Naoki Nakamura

Note : Round 5 and 6 supposed to be held on August 21 and 22, but were postponed due to the rising COVID-19 cases in Japan. The event was moved to November 20 and 21 but the event was not renamed.

== Ranking ==
=== Drivers' Ranking ===
Pos	Driver	Rd.1	Rd.2	Rd.3	Rd.4	Rd.7	Rd.8	Rd.9	Rd.10	Rd.5	Rd.6	Total
1	Naoki Nakamura	11	21	12	15	**25**	**29**	17	**29**	20	**27**	206
2	Masashi Yokoi	5	**25**	19	21	16	21	15	8	17	22	169
3	Kazumi Takahashi	16	18	14	20	11	13	19	3	0	11	125
4	Masao Suenaga	16	16	7	10	7	23	10	11	11	0	111
5	Kojiro Mekuwa	13	16	0	3	22	10	0	2	21	16	103
6	Yukio Matsui	0	6	**21†**	17	0	9	25	0	15	4	97
7	Masanori Kohashi	0	0	10	**25**	20	0	0	0	17	22	94
8	Hokuto Matsuyama	22	12	0	2	4	11	21	18	1	0	91
9	Seimi Tanaka	3	14	11	16	6	1	0	12	8	16	87
10	Naoto Suenaga	10	2	16	0	0	12	5	5	25	0	75
11	Hideyuki Fujino	23	12	0	0	5	16	0	0	6	12	74
12	Daigo Saito	**25**	10	0	0	16	0	6	0	7	2	66
13	Yusuke Kitaoka	8	4	1	5	12	3	4	13	0	8	58
14	Koudai Sobagiri	4	0	16	9	12	6	0	6	0	0	53
15	Akinori Utsumi	6	5	**21**†	6	0	0	0	11	3	0	52
16	Shingo Hatanaka	7	0	6	7	0	4	10	0	10	5	49
17	Takahiro Ueno	1	3	0	4	10	0	0	23	0	7	48
18	Masato Kawabata	0	7	0	11	3	5	16	0	0	6	48
19	Mitsuru Murakami	0	0	0	0	0	7	11	10	0	0	28
20	Katsuhiro Ueo	0	1	0	0	0	0	7	16	2	0	26
21	Shigehisa Sasayama	0	0	0	0	2	0	3	0	5	10	20
22	Yoshifumi Tadakoro	0	0	3	0	0	0	0	4	0	0	7
23	Takeshi Mogi	0	0	5	0	0	0	0	0	0	1	6
24	Teruyoshi Iwai	2	0	2	0	0	0	2	0	0	0	6
25	Takahiro Mori	0	0	4	0	0	0	0	1	0	0	5
26	Koji Yamagauchi	0	0	0	0	0	0	0	0	4	0	4
27	Ryusei Akiba	0	0	0	0	0	0	0	0	0	3	3
28	Masakazu Hashi	0	0	0	0	1	2	0	0	0	0	3
29	Masaru Fuchigami	0	0	0	0	0	0	1	0	0	0	1
30	Hisashi Saito	0	0	0	0	0	0	0	0	0	0	0

Note :

- Bold : Tsuiso (Dual-run) Winner
- Italic : Tanso (Single-run) WInner
- † - Round 3 at Tsubaka was abandoned before the final because of curfew. Both finalists were co-champions for championship purposes, and the points for both first and second place were combined and split, with each driver awarded 21 points each as co-champions. Akinori Utsumi was symbolically the winner based on higher seed.

=== Tanso series Ranking ===
Pos.	Driver	Rd.1	Rd.2	Rd.3	Rd.4	Rd.7	Rd.8	Rd.9	Rd.10	Rd.5	Rd.6	Total
1	Naoki Nakamura	10	12	**20**	16	7	**20**	**20**	**20**	15	15	155
2	Masashi Yokoi	8	13	14	8	16	16	16	14	**20**	**20**	145
3	Masao Suenaga	16	16	11	12	11	15	15	16	6	0	118
4	Kazumi Takahashi	7	7	15	15	12	13	14	7	0	10	100
5	Hokuto Matsuyama	**20**	**20**	0	2	5	11	10	11	1	0	80
6	Seimi Tanaka	3	15	13	4	8	1	0	6	13	16	79
7	Yukio Matsui	0	10	7	**20**	0	14	6	0	16	4	77
8	Yusuke Kitaoka	13	5	2	6	13	3	7	10	0	13	72
9	Koudai Sobagiri	4	0	12	14	**20**	7	0	13	0	0	70
10	Naoto Suenaga	6	3	16	0	0	12	8	12	8	0	65
11	Kojiro Mekuwa	14	1	0	3	14	10	0	3	7	11	63
12	Hideyuki Fujino	15	14	0	0	6	4	0	0	11	12	62
13	Masanori Kohashi	0	0	1	11	15	0	0	0	14	14	55
14	Masato Kawabata	0	11	0	13	4	6	11	0	0	7	52
15	Shingo Hatanaka	12	0	10	10	0	5	3	0	5	6	51
16	Daigo Saito	5	8	0	0	10	0	12	0	12	2	49
17	Akinori Utsumi	11	6	8	7	0	0	0	5	3	0	40
18	Takahiro Ueno	1	4	0	5	1	0	0	15	0	8	34
19	Shigehisa Sasayama	0	0	0	0	3	0	4	0	10	5	22
20	Katsuhiro Ueo	0	0	0	0	0	0	13	4	2	0	21
21	Mitsuru Murakami	0	0	0	0	0	8	5	2	0	0	15
22	Yoshifumi Tadokoro	0	0	4	0	0	0	0	8	0	0	12
23	Takeshi Mogi	0	0	6	0	0	0	0	0	0	1	7
24	Teruyoshi Iwai	2	0	3	0	0	0	2	0	0	0	7
25	Takahiro Mori	0	0	5	0	0	0	0	1	0	0	6
26	Koji Yamaguchi	0	0	0	0	0	0	0	0	4	0	4
27	Masukazi Hashi	0	0	0	0	2	2	0	0	0	0	4
28	Ryusei Akiba	0	0	0	0	0	0	0	0	0	3	3
29	Masaru Fuchigami	0	0	0	0	0	0	1	0	0	0	1
30	Hisashi Saito	0	0	0	1	0	0	0	0	0	0	1

Note :

Bold : Tanso (Single-run) Winner

=== Teams' Ranking ===
Pos.	Team	Rd.1	Rd.2	Rd.3	Rd.4	Rd.7	Rd.8	Rd.9	Rd.10	Rd.5	Rd.6	Total
1	MUGEN PLUS team ALIVE VALINO	6	20	3	6	26	26	6	26	15	26	160
2	NANKANG TIRE DRIFT TEAM D-MAX	6	26	15	20	6	20	6	3	6	15	123
3	LINGLONG TIRE DRIFT Team ORANGE	6	3	6	26	15	6	3	3	26	20	114
4	FAT FIVE RACING	26	6		3	10	6	20	15	3	3	92
5	TMS RACING TEAM SAILUN TIRE	10	15	6	15	6	6	15	3		6	82
6	alpinestars LINGLONG G-MEISTER	6	10		3	20	6		3	20	10	78
7	Team RE雨宮 K&N		3	20	6		3	26		6	3	67
8	Team TOYO TIRES DRIFT	20	6		6	3	10	10		3	6	64
9	TEAM SAILUN TIRE	3	6	20	10	3	3		6	3	6	60
10	TEAM VERTEX SAILUN TIRE	3	3		3	6			20		3	38
11	TEAM MORI	3	3	3	3	6	3	3	6		3	33
12	横浜トヨペット SAILUN 俺だっ	3		3	3		3	6		6	3	27
13	TEAM SHIBATA SAILUN TIRE	3		10	3	3	3		3			25
14	VALINO		3					3	10	3		19
15	Team M2 Racing					3		3		3	6	15
16	Team C.M.Feeling						3	6	6			15
17	RS WATANABE SPEED MASTER BUY NOW JAPAN	3		3				3	3			12
18	VITOUR TIRE SPEED MASTER			3							3	6
19	GP SPORTS			3					3			6
20	PEACE WORKS 男気DRIFT Racing					3	3					6
21	Team BOOSTAR										3	3
22	msr kitakyushu							3				3
23	マチュアーミヤセイミツS15				3							3

Source : 2021 D1GP Series ranking
