= 2020 D1 Grand Prix series =

Motor racing competition

The 2020-21 Gran Turismo D1 Grand Prix series is the twentieth season of D1 Grand Prix series which started at Okuibuki Motorpark on 24 July 2020 and ended at Tsukuba Circuit on 31 January 2021. The season was initially scheduled to start on 16 May, but was postponed due to the COVID-19 pandemic.

Masashi Yokoi entered the season as the defending champion.

== Teams and drivers ==
Due to COVID-19 travel restrictions, only Japanese drivers participated in the season, with no foreigners competing.

Team	No	Driver	Car	Tires	Rounds
NANKANG TIRE DRIFT TEAM D-MAX	70	(Japan) Masashi Yokoi	Nissan Silvia (S15)	Nankang	All
NANKANG TIRE DRIFT TEAM D-MAX	46	(Japan) Masao Suenaga	Nissan Silvia (S15)	Nankang	All
Team RE雨宮 K&N	7	(Japan) Yukio Matsui	Mazda RX-7 (FD3S)	Toyo Tires	All
Team TOYOTIRES DRIFT-1	66	(Japan) Hideyuki Fujino	Nissan 180SX (RPS13)	Toyo Tires	All
Team TOYOTIRES DRIFT-1	90	(Japan) Masato Kawabata	Toyota GR Supra (A90)	Toyo Tires	All
LINGLONG TIRE DRIFT Team ORANGE	4	(Japan) Masanori Kohashi	Nissan Silvia (S15)	Linglong	All
LINGLONG TIRE DRIFT Team ORANGE	9	(Japan) Naoto Suenaga	Nissan Silvia (S15)	Linglong	All
CrystalH.E VALINO N-style	99	(Japan) Naoki Nakamura	Nissan Silvia (S15)	Valino	All
SAILUN TIRE SUNRISE	18	(Japan) Tetsuya Hibino	Nissan Silvia (S14)	Sailun	All
SAILUN TIRES DIXCEL MOTORSPORT	5	(Japan) Akinori Utsumi	Nissan Silvia (S15)	Sailun	All
TEAM MORI	52	(Japan) Yusuke Kitaoka	Toyota Mark II (JZX100)	Valino	All
SAILUN TIRE IGM Racing	45	(Japan) Shingo Hatanaka	Toyota Chaser (JZX100)	Sailun	All
VALINO	15	(Japan) Katsuhiro Ueo	Nissan Silvia (S15)	Valino	1,4-8
SEIMI STYLE DRIFT SAILUN TIRE	2	(Japan) Seimi Tanaka	Nissan Silvia (S15)	Sailun	All
FAT FIVE RACING	87	(Japan) Daigo Saito	Toyota GR Supra (A90)	Zestino	All
FAT FIVE RACING	77	(Japan) Hokuto Matsuyama	Toyota GR Supra (A90)	Toyo Tires	All
TEAM VERTEX SAILUN TIRE	78	(Japan) Takahiro Ueno	Lexus RC (GSC10)	Sailun	All
TMS RACING TEAM	36	(Japan) Kazumi Takahashi	Toyota Mark II (JZX100)	Toyo Tires	All
TMS RACING TEAM	36	(Japan) Kazumi Takahashi	Toyota Mark II (JZX100)	Rydanz	All
BUY NOW JAPAN スピードマスターWATANABE	51	(Japan) Teruyoshi Iwai	Mazda RX-7 (FC3S)	Goodride	All
BUY NOW JAPAN スピードマスターWATANABE	43	(Japan) Yoshifumi Tadakoro	Toyota AE86	Toyo Tires	All
adidas a-unit LINGLONG G-meister	16	(Japan) Koji Yamaguchi	Nissan Silvia (S15)	Linglong	All
BUY NOW JAPAN eternal	14	(Japan) Tomohiro Murayama	Nissan Silvia (S14)	Dunlop	All
AUTO-TEC-RACING	19	(Japan) Kentaro Kawai	Toyota Chaser (JZX100)	Valino	All
HIRANO TIRE	22	(Japan) Kenji Kiguchi	Nissan Laurel (C33)	Vitour	1-6
Team C.M.Feeling.	23	(Japan) Mitsuru Murakami	Nissan Silvia (S15)	Toyo Tires	1-6
Weins 横浜トヨペット 俺だっ！	91	(Japan) Mitsuru Murakami	Toyota GR Supra (A90)	Toyo Tires	7-8
Team M2 Racing	25	(Japan) Masataka Kawashima	Toyota Mark II (JZX100)	Valino	1,4-8
Team M2 Racing	33	(Japan) Shigehisa Sasayama	Toyota Chaser (JZX100)	Valino	All
SHIBATA DRIFT RACING TEAM	31	(Japan) Koudai Sobagiri	Infiniti Q60 (Q60)	Rydanz	All
SHIBATA DRIFT RACING TEAM	31	(Japan) Koudai Sobagiri	Infiniti Q60 (Q60)	Sailun	All
IWANA CENTER SPEED MASTER	27	(Japan) Takeshi Mogi	Nissan Silvia (S15)	Valino	2-3,6-8
Entered on entry list but unable to participate due to travel restrictions
Mozambique Team	17	(Mozambique) Zanil Satar	Nissan Skyline GT-T (R34)	Valino	-
SAILUN MOTORSPORT SAILUN TIRE	84	(Hong Kong) Charles Ng	BMW 3 Series (E90)	Sailun	-
Team TOYOTIRES DRIFT-2	95	(Thailand) Daychapon Toyingcharoen	Toyota 86 (ZN6)	Toyo Tires	-

== Schedule ==
=== 2020 schedule ===
Round	Venue	Date	Winner
1	Okuibuki Motorpark, Shiga Prefecture	July 24 2020	Masato Kawabata
2	Ebisu Circuit (Drift Stadium), Fukushima Prefecture	August 22 2020	Masanori Kohashi
3	Ebisu Circuit (Drift Stadium), Fukushima Prefecture	August 23 2020	Masanori Kohashi
4	(Ōita Prefecture) Autopolis, Oita Prefecture	October 31	Masanori Kohashi
5	(Ōita Prefecture) Autopolis, Oita Prefecture	November 1 2020	Katsuhiro Ueo
6	Ebisu Circuit (West Course), Fukushima Prefecture	November 15 2020	Masanori Kohashi
7	Tsukuba Circuit, Ibaraki Prefecture	January 30 2021	Naoki Nakamura
8	Tsukuba Circuit, Ibaraki Prefecture	January 31 2021	Masanori Kohashi

=== Proposed schedule before pandemic ===
Round	Venue	Date
1	Okuibuki Motorpark, Shiga Prefecture	May 17 2020
2	Tsukuba Circuit, Ibaraki Prefecture	June 27
3	Tsukuba Circuit, Ibaraki Prefecture	June 28
4	Ebisu Circuit (Drift Stadium), Fukushima Prefecture	August 22
5	Ebisu Circuit (Drift Stadium), Fukushima Prefecture	August 23
6	(Hyōgo Prefecture) Central Circuit, Hyogo Prefecture	September 27
7	(Ōita Prefecture) Autopolis, Oita Prefecture	November 1
8	Ebisu Circuit (West Course), Fukushima Prefecture	November 15

== Series ranking ==
=== Drivers' ranking ===
Pos.	Driver	Round.1	Round.2	Round.3	Round.4	Round.5	Round.6	Round.7	Round.8	Total.
1	Masanori Kohashi	0	**27**	**28**	**25**	16	**28**	21	**29**	174
2	Masashi Yokoi	16	21	13	16	2	21	23	17	129
3	Hideyuki Fujino	20	12	16	25	12	7	11	5	108
4	Tetsuya Hibino	22	16	10	16	0	11	12	6	93
5	Naoki Nakamura	12	6	18	2	0	0	**29**	24	91
6	Masato Kawabata	**25**	11	17	14	18	0	1	1	87
7	Naoto Suenaga	11	7	21	0	21	9	7	4	80
8	Seimi Tanaka	4	12	11	11	0	6	16	11	71
9	Daigo Saito	1	22	4	0	7	4	6	20	64
10	Hokuto Matsuyama	5	13	0	0	4	22	0	13	57
11	Yukio Matsui	2	0	0	19	3	13	5	8	50
12	Takahiro Ueno	10	1	5	10	11	10	0	2	49
13	Masao Suenaga	7	0	3	8	9	0	10	10	47
14	Katsuhiro Ueo	0	0	0	3	**25**	18	0	0	46
15	Yusuke Kitaoka	0	0	0	0	16	0	14	7	37
16	Akinori Utsumi	0	0	2	0	12	12	8	3	37
17	Shingo Hatanaka	12	10	10	0	0	0	4	0	36
18	Koudai Sobagiri	0	3	0	1	5	5	3	12	29
19	Tomohiro Murayama	16	0	0	0	0	3	0	0	19
20	Yoshifumi Tadokoro	0	0	0	4	10	0	0	0	14
21	Mitsuru Murakami	3	0	0	7	0	1	0	0	11
22	Kenji Kiguchi	0	0	6	5	0	0	0	0	11
23	Koji Yamaguchi	6	4	0	0	0	0	0	0	10
24	Kazumi Takahashi	0	2	7	0	0	0	0	0	9
25	Teruyoshi Iwai	0	0	0	6	1	0	0	0	7
26	Takeshi Mogi	0	5	0	0	0	0	0	0	5
27	Shigehisa Sasayama	0	0	1	0	0	2	0	0	3
28	Kentaro Kawai	0	0	0	0	0	0	2	0	2

Note :

- Bold : Tsuiso (Dual-run) Winner
- Italic : Tanso (Single-run) WInner

=== Tanso series ranking ===
Pos.	Driver	RD.1	RD.2	RD.3	RD.4	RD.5	RD.6	RD.7	RD.8	Total.
1	Masashi Yokoi	16	16	14	16	5	13	15	14	109
2	Masanori Kohashi	0	15	16	7	16	16	16	**20**	106
3	Hideyuki Fujino	15	7	12	**20**	**20**	12	11	8	105
4	Naoki Nakamura	**20**	11	13	2	0	0	**20**	16	82
5	Tetsuya Hibino	14	10	15	12	0	6	12	11	80
6	Seimi Tanaka	7	**20**	11	13	0	10	13	6	80
7	Naoto Suenaga	5	13	8	0	12	14	7	4	63
8	Hokuto Matsuyama	10	12	0	0	10	**20**	0	10	62
9	Daigo Saito	2	14	0		14	5	6	15	61
10	Masato Kawabata	11	5	**20**	15	7	0	1	1	60
11	Masao Suenaga	13	0	4	11	15	0	8	5	56
12	Yukio Matsui	3	0	0	14	6	11	5	13	52
13	Koudai Sobagiri	0	4	0	1	11	7	3	7	33
14	Akinori Utsumi	0	0	2	0	8	8	10	3	31
15	Katsuhiro Ueo	0	0	0	3	13	15	0	0	31
16	Takahiro Ueno	1	2	6	10	4	4	0	2	29
17	Yusuke Kitaoka	0	0	0	0	1	0	14	12	27
18	Koji Yamaguchi	12	6	0	0	0	0	0	0	18
19	Shingo Hatanaka	6	1	3	0	0	0	4	0	14
20	Mitsuru Murakami	4	0	0	8	0	1	0	0	13
21	Kazumi Takahashi	0	3	10	0	0	0	0	0	13
22	Kenji Kiguchi	0	0	7	5	0	0	0	0	12
23	Tomohiro Murayama	8	0	0	0	0	3	0	0	11
24	Teruyoshi Iwai	0	0	0	6	2	0	0	0	8
25	Takeshi Mogi	0	8	0	0	0	0	0	0	8
26	Yoshifumi Tadokoro	0	0	0	4	3	0	0	0	7
27	Shigehisa Sasayama	0	0	1	0	0	2	0	0	3

Note :

Bold : Tanso (Single-run) Winner

=== Teams' ranking ===
Rank.	Team	RD.1	RD.2	RD.3	RD.4	RD.5	RD.6	RD.7	RD8	Total.
1	LINGLONG TIRE DRIFT Team ORANGE	6	26	26	26	20	26	15	26	171
2	Team TOYOTIRES DRIFT-1	26	6	10	20	15	3	6	3	89
3	NANKANG TIRE DRIFT TEAM D-MAX	6	15	6	6	3	20	20	10	86
4	Crystal HE VALINO N-style	3	3	15	3	0	0	26	20	70
5	FAT FIVE RACING	3	20	3	0	3	15	3	15	62
6	SAILUN TIRE SUNRISE	20	10	3	10	0	6	6	3	58
7	VALINO	0	0	0	3	26	10	0	0	39
8	SEIMI STYLE DRIFT SAILUN TIRE	3	3	6	6	0	3	10	6	37
9	TEAM VERTEX SAILUN TIRE	6	3	3	6	6	6	0	3	33
10	Team RE Amemiya K & N	0	0	0	15	3	6	3	3	30
11	TEAM SHIBATA SAILUN TIRE	0	3	0	3	3	3	3	6	21
12	SAILUN TIRES DIXCEL MOTORSPORT	0	0	3	0	6	6	3	3	21
13	TEAM MORI	0	0	0	0	10	0	6	3	19
14	SAILUN TIRE IGM Racing	6	6	0	0	0	0	3	0	15
15	BUY NOW JAPAN with eternal	10	0	0	0	0	3	0	0	13
16	Team CM Feeling.	3	0	0	3	0	3	0	0	9
17	BUY NOW JAPAN SPEED MASTER WATANABE	0	0	0	3	6	0	0	0	9
18	Team M2 Racing	0	0	3	0	0	3	0	0	6
19	HIRANO TIRE	0	0	3	3	0	0	0	0	6
20	TMS RACING TEAM	0	3	3	0	0	0	0	0	6
21	adidas a-unit LINGLONG G-meister	3	3	0	0	0	0	0	0	6
22	AUTO-TEC RACING	0	0	0	0	0	0	3	0	3
23	IWANA CENTER SPEED MASTER	0	3	0	0	0	0	0	0	3

Source : 2020 D1GP series ranking
