= 2019 D1 Grand Prix series =

Motor racing competition

The 2019 D1 Grand Prix series is the nineteenth season for the D1 Grand Prix series. The season began on June 29 at Tsukuba Circuit, and ended on November 3 at Autopolis.

== Teams and drivers ==
Tire	Team	Car	Engine/Turbo	No.	Drivers	Round(s)
5FIVEX	Seimi Style Drift	Nissan S15	Toyota 2JZ/GCG Garrett GTX3582RS	2	(Japan) Seimi Tanaka	1-6
5FIVEX	Dixcel D1 Racing	Nissan S15	Toyota 2JZ/GCG Garrett GTX4088	5	(Japan) Akinori Utsumi	1-6
Dunlop	激☆滑走団 IK BNJ	Nissan S14	Nissan SR20/GCG Garrett GTX3582R	14	(Japan) Tomohiro Murayama	1-2
Goodride	adidas a-unit G-meister	Nissan S15	Toyota 2JZ/HKS T04Z	16	(Japan) Koji Yamaguchi	1-6
Goodride	北九州 MSR	Nissan S15	Nissan SR20/GCG Garrett GTX3076R	31	(Japan) Masaru Fuchigami	1-2
Goodride	スピードマスター BUY NOW JAPAN	Mazda FC3S	Mazda 20B/TBA	51	(Japan) Teruyoshi Iwai	1-2, 5-6
Goodride	nichiei racing	Nissan S15	TBA	61	(Japan) Kunihiko Teramachi	1-6
Goodride	nichiei racing	Nissan ER34	TBA	62	(Japan) Junya Ishikawa	1-6
Goodyear	AST D1 project & 俺だRacing	Toyota ZN6	Toyota 2JZ/Trust T88-34D	8	(Japan) Masayoshi Tokita	1-6
Goodyear	Origin Labo. Racing	Nissan RPS13	Nissan SR20/Garrett GT3582	81	(Japan) Kazuya Bai	1-2
Linglong	DRIFT Team ORANGE	Nissan S15	Toyota 2JZ/GCG Garrett GTX35	4	(Japan) Masanori Kohashi	1-6
Linglong	DRIFT Team ORANGE	Nissan S15	Toyota 2JZ/GCG Garrett GTX4088	9	(Japan) Naoto Suenaga	1-6
Nankang	D-MAX Racing Team	Nissan S15	Toyota 2JZ/GCG Garrett GTX4088	70	(Japan) Masashi Yokoi	1-6
Nankang	D-MAX Racing Team	Nissan S15	Toyota 2JZ/GCG Garrett GTX4088	84	(Hong Kong) Charles Ng	1-6
Toyo	Team RE雨宮 K&N	Mazda FD3S	Mazda 20B/Trust T88-34D	7	(Japan) Yukio Matsui	1-6
Toyo	Used Parts Tadokoro	Toyota AE86	Toyota 2JZ/GCG Garrett 3584RS	43	(Japan) Yoshifumi Tadokoro	1-6
Toyo	Team Toyo Tires Drift - 1	Nissan RPS13	Toyota 2JZ/Trust T88-34D	66	(Japan) Hideyuki Fujino	1-6
Toyo	Team Toyo Tires Drift - 1	Toyota A90	Toyota 2JZ/BorgWarner	90	(Japan) Masato Kawabata	1-6
Toyo	Team Toyo Tires Drift - 2	Toyota ZN6	Nissan VR38DETT/HKS GT1000+	95	(Thailand) Daychapon Toyingcharoen	1-6
Toyo/Rydanz	TMS Racing Team	Toyota JZX100	Toyota 2JZ/GCG BorgWarner EFR9174	36	(Japan) Kazumi Takahashi	1-6
TRI-ACE	Team TNR T, C, L, S	Toyota JZX100	Toyota 2JZ/GCG Garrett	30	(Japan) Tetsuro Nakada	1-2
TRI-ACE	Moty's West Auto	Toyota JZX100	Toyota 2JZ/Mitsubishi TF-08 SPL	73	(Japan) Ikuo Saito	1-2, 5-6
Valino	Team ZSS Racing	Nissan S15	Nissan VR38DETT/HKS GT1000	15	(Japan) Katsuhiro Ueo	1-2
Valino	K'SPEC SunRISE Racing	Nissan S14	Toyota 2JZ/GCG Garrett GTX3582RS	18	(Japan) Tetsuya Hibino	1-6
Valino	IGM Racing	Toyota JZX100	Toyota 2JZ/HKS GTIII-4R	45	(Japan) Shingo Hatanaka	1-6
Valino	Auto Garage Kataoka ESR	Nissan S15	Toyota 2JZ/ BorgWarner S300	49	(Japan) Hiroyuki Matsuta	1-2, 5-6
Valino	Team Mori	Toyota JZX100	Toyota 2JZ/GCG Garrett GTX3584RS	52	(Japan) Yusuke Kitaoka	1-6
Valino	Team Vertex	Lexus GSC10	TBA	78	(Japan) Takahiro Ueno	1-6
Valino	スピードマスター BUY NOW JAPAN	Toyota AE86	Nissan SR20/Trust T67-25G	86	(Japan) Noboru Morita	1-2, 5-6
Valino	N-Style Alive FNATZ	Nissan S15	Toyota 2JZ/TBA	99	(Japan) Naoki Nakamura	1-6
Vitour	Hirano Tire	Nissan C33	Toyota 2JZ/HKS T04Z	22	(Japan) Kenji Kiguchi	1-2, 5-6
Zeknova	Fat Five Racing	Toyota A90	Toyota 2JZ/HKS GTIII-4R	87	(Japan) Daigo Saito	1-6
N/A	MMM Racing	Ferrari 550	Nissan VR38DETT/GCG Garrett GTX4202	60	(Japan) Youichi Imamura	1-2

== Schedule ==
2018 D1 Grand Prix race locations

Round	Venue	Date	Winner	Report
1	Tsukuba Circuit, Ibaraki Prefecture	June 29	(Japan) Masashi Yokoi	Report
2	Tsukuba Circuit, Ibaraki Prefecture	June 30	(Japan) Masashi Yokoi	Report
3	Tokachi International Speedway, Hokkaido Prefecture	July 27	(Japan) Yukio Matsui	Report
4	Tokachi International Speedway, Hokkaido Prefecture	July 28	(Japan) Yukio Matsui	Report
5	Ebisu Circuit, Fukushima Prefecture	August 24	(Japan) Masanori Kohashi	Report
6	Ebisu Circuit, Fukushima Prefecture	August 25	(Japan) Masanori Kohashi	Report
7	Autopolis, Ōita Prefecture	November 2–3	(Japan) Naoki Nakamura	Report

== Drivers' rankings ==
=== D1GP ===
Pos.	Driver	Rd.1	Rd.2	Rd.3	Rd.4	Rd.5	Rd.6	Rd.7	Total
1	(Japan) Masashi Yokoi	29	27	23	18	0	0	0	97
2	(Japan) Yukio Matsui	11	0	25	25	13	16	0	90
3	(Japan) Masanori Kohashi	0	11	9	12	25	25	3	85
4	(Japan) Hideyuki Fujino	0	0	18	21	17	22	11	89
5	(Japan) Naoto Suenaga	10	19	6	0	10	21	21	87
6	(Japan) Tetsuya Hibino	24	17	16	3	5	0	10	65
7	(Japan) Akinori Utsumi	0	16	10	4	20	11	5	66
8	(Japan) Naoki Nakamura	0	0	17	14	21	4	26	82
9	(Japan) Yusuke Kitaoka	16	6	2	17	6	5	16	68
10	(Japan) Shingo Hatanaka	19	7	4	6	0	12	12	60
11	(Japan) Seimi Tanaka	1	11	11	0	11	9	0	43
12	(Japan) Masato Kawabata	12	5	15	DSQ	2	6	10	50
13	(Thailand) Daychapon Toyingcharoen	3	10	0	10	3	11	4	41
14	(Japan) Katsuhiro Ueo	10	21	0	0	0	0	21	52
15	(Hong Kong) Charles Kaki Ng	0	4	5	0	16	1	2	28
16	(Japan) Kazumi Takahashi	13	2	DSQ	DSQ	0	10		25
17	(Japan) Daigo Saito	2	0	0	11	11	0		24
18	(Japan) Teruyoshi Iwai	0	0	0	0	7	14		21
19	(Japan) Takahiro Ueno	7	12	0	0	0	0		19
20	(Japan) Junya Ishikawa	6	3	0	1	0	0		10
21	(Japan) Koji Yamaguchi	0	0	0	5	4	0		9
21	(Japan) Yoshifumi Tadokoro	0	0	7	2	0	0		9
23	(Japan) Tomohiro Murayama	5	0	0	0	0	0		5
24	(Japan) Kunihiko Teramachi	0	1	3	0	0	0		4
24	(Japan) Masaru Fuchigami	4	0	0	0	0	0		4
26	(Japan) Ikuo Saito	0	0	0	0	0	3		3
27	(Japan) Hiroyuki Matsuta	0	0	0	0	0	2		2
28	(Japan) Kenji Kiguchi	0	0	0	0	1	0		1
