= Masashi Yokoi =

Japanese Professional Drifter

Masashi Yokoi 横井 昌志
- Nationality: Japanese
- Born: 29 October 1982 (age 44) Aichi

D1 Grand Prix career
- Current team: Mind Control Racing
- Car number: 70
- Former teams: D-Max Racing Team
- Wins: 14
- Best finish: 1st in 2018, 2019, 2022

Previous series
- 2007-2009,2011-2012 2015 2014-2017: D1 Street Legal; Formula Drift; Formula Drift Japan

Championship titles
- 2012 2018, 2019, 2022: D1 Street Legal; D1 Grand Prix

Masashi Yokoi (横井 昌志, Yokoi Masashi, 29 October 1982, Aichi) is a Japanese professional drifter, he currently competing in D1 Grand Prix and win the championship in 2018, 2019 and 2022 making him the second driver to win back-to-back championship. he is nicknamed as Zombie Yokoi or Galaxy Yokoi

== Career ==
Yokoi gained D1 license after competing and winning in Ikaten event and started to competing in D1 Street Legal in 2007 with Nissan Silvia S15 he was nicknamed Zombie after he still able to run his car despite crashing in to the wall during practice and solo run.

For 2008, Yokoi decided to do both D1 Grand Prix and D1 Street Legal with 2 different S14 Silvia built to specification of each category. While able to be seeded driver in D1 Street Legal, he only able to pass qualifying in final two round and both times defeated in Top 16.

In 2009, he only compete in D1 Street Legal and receive support from Dunlop after winning the audition event at 2008 Dunlop Drift Festival. The support from Dunlop improve Yokoi results as he finished the season fourth in standings with a single win at season finale in Tsukuba.

After not competing in 2010, he returns to D1 Street Legal in 2011 now mainly supported by D-Max. Despite leading the championship after round 2, he loses the lead an ended the season third in standings. The following year, he won three times during the season and winning the championship. He also made a return to D1GP with D-Max starting from the Centrair round.

From 2013, Yokoi began to compete full time in D1GP and won his first round the following year in round 5 at Ebisu Circuit defeating the seasons eventual champion Kuniaki Takahashi and finished 3rd in final standings of 2014 season.

In 2015, Yokoi competed in Formula Drift USA with support from Yokohama tires and get one win on his only season in the competition and nicknamed Galaxy Yokoi. while silmutaneusly compete in D1GP.

In 2016, Yokoi switched to a 2JZ powered S15 built by his shop and following year in 2017 he and his team switch tire from Yokohama to Nankang after Yokohama pulled out from D1GP, he finished second in D1GP with 2 wins missing out on title in the final round of the season. along with D1GP he also compete in Formula Drift Japan with the same car he drive in USA for 2016 and his D1 car in 2017. In the end of the season he competes in first ever FIA Intercontinental Drift CuP.

In 2018, Yokoi built a new S15 Silvia while his previous car was driven by his teammate Akira Hirajima. despite Masato Kawabata domination in Solo Run Yokoi managed to get three wins and perform consistently scoring no less than 20 points throughout the season with exceptions in round 2 and 5 which allow him to win his first championship in final round after Kawabata defeated in Top 16.

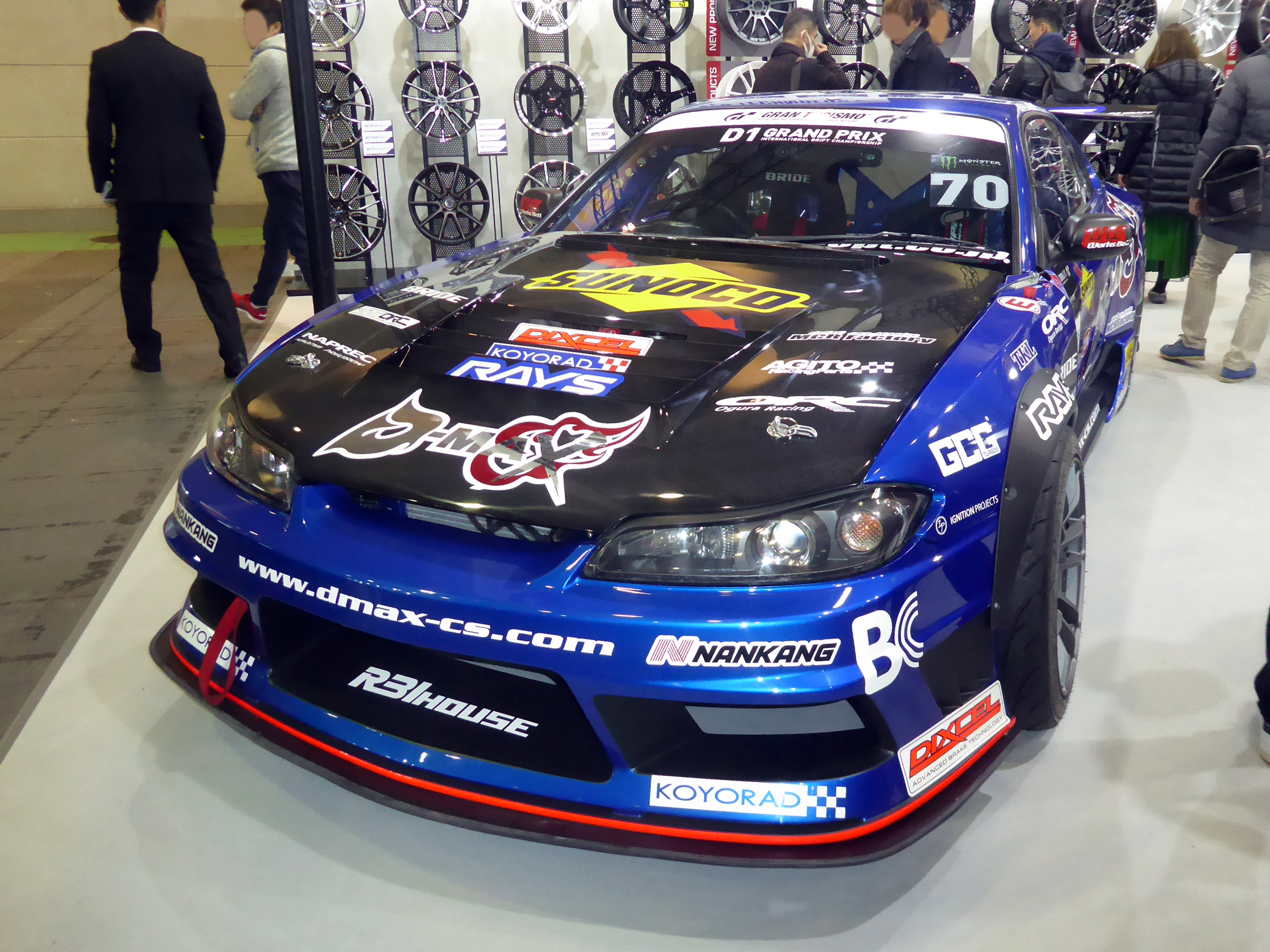
Yokoi's S15 he use in D1GP

In 2019, Yukoi won the first two-round followed by two more podiums in the series, despite not scoring any points in the remaining round he hanging on to the championship lead and claimed his second title, making him the second driver after Youichi Imamura to win back-to-back title in D1GP and winning it in same car he previously win the championship in.

In 2020 season, Yokoi debuted his and D-Max's fourth S15 Silvia which is an upgrade from his previous car which going to be driven by Masao Suenaga who returmed after competing as privateer in 2019, finished second in the standings but managed to be Solo Run Champion.

2021, Yokoi won at round 2 and finished second again in the championship. he was also doing stunt drives for movie Alivehoon alongside other D1 drivers such as Naoki Nakamura and Yusuke Kitaoka

After two years finishing as runner-up, Yokoi won his third D1GP title in the final round of the 2022 season equaling Masato Kawabata's tally and became the third person to win three or more titles.

In 2023, D-Max switched tire suppliers to Goodride. He won the opening two rounds and more high points scoring in round 3 and 4, he created a big lead in the championship standings. However due to tire regulation violation, he was disqualified from round 3 and 4 and stripped of the point he gain there. Yokoi unable to regain his form from the opening rounds as he failed to qualify twice and even crashed before his qualifying run at Autopolis. He ended the season eight in standings finishing behind his teammate for the first time ever.

For 2024, Yokoi partnered with 2022 D1 Lights champion Yuki Tano and switched tire supplier to Toyo Tires due to Tano's contract with them. Yokoi unable to reach final once this season but consistently scoring points as he ended up fifth in standings making him the highest ranked Toyo Tires equipped driver.

At 2025 Tokyo Auto Salon, Yokoi announced he is leaving the D-Max team at the end of the season, ending a 13 years stint with the team but still have ties with them as sponsor. Yokoi once again partnered with rookie and reigning D1 Lights champion Kenshiro Wada. Despite scoring well in first four round of the season including a second place in round 2 which put him second in standings behind Kojiro Mekuwa, he unable to perform consistently and finished the season fifth in standings.

For 2026, Yokoi announced he will compete with his own team and returning to S14 Silvia platform for the first time since his debut season in 2008. His S14 is a 2JZ powered car producing 1000bhp he initially build as a side project and uses it in World Time Attack Challenge at Sydney, Australia in 2024 and 2025.

== Personal life ==
Yokoi currently lives in Ichinomiya, Aichi while running his own shop MCR Factory. MCR stands for Mind Control Racing which is his street drifting team name where he built and maintained his D1GP cars and also fielded a team in D1 Lights. In 2025, his driver and employee Genki Mogami win the series champion. He goes jet skiing as a hobby, which he often does in his free time, he has two children.

== Complete drifting results ==
Year	Team	Car	1	2	3	4	5	6	7	8	9	10	Final standings	Points
2007	MCR Factory	Nissan Silvia (S14)	EBI DNQ	FSW DNQ	SUZ DNQ	SUG R	EBI DNQ	AUT DNQ	FSW DNQ				NC	0
2008	MCR Factory	Nissan Silvia (S14)	EBI 21	FSW DNQ	SUZ 24	OKA DNQ	AUT DNQ	EBI 14	FSW 14				26th	7
2012	D-MAX Racing Team	Nissan Silvia (S15)	DAI	SUZ	AUT 18	EBI 8	EBI 18	CEN DNQ	DAI DNQ				27th	13
2013	D-MAX Racing Team	Nissan Silvia (S15)	MAI 4	SUZ 14	EBI 4	EBI 10	HUS 12	DAI 11					8th	59
2014	D-MAX Racing Team	Nissan Silvia (S15)	FSW 7	SUZ 12	AUT 2	EBI 22	EBI 1	DAI 11					3rd	107
2015	D-MAX Racing Team	Nissan Silvia (S15)	DAI 12	SUZ 5	TSU	EBI 9	MAI 6	DAI 18					11th	70
2016	D-MAX Racing Team	Nissan Silvia (S15)	DAI 14	FSW 6	TSU 2	TSU 24	EBI 3	EBI 5	DAI 9				4th	99
2017	D-MAX Racing Team	Nissan Silvia (S15)	DAI 3	DAI 1	TSU 19	MAI 8	EBI 9	EBI 4	DAI 1				2nd	128
2018	D-MAX Racing Team	Nissan Silvia (S15)	MAI 4	MAI 12	AUT 1	TOK 1	TSU 24	EBI 2	EBI 1	DAI 3			1st	166
2019	D-MAX Racing Team	Nissan Silvia (S15)	TSU 1	TSU 1	TOK 2	TOK 3	EBI 24	EBI R	AUT 19				1st	97
2020年	D-MAX Racing Team	Nissan Silvia (S15)	OKU 5	EBI 3	EBI 6	AUT 5	AUT 15	EBI 2	TSU 2	TSU 4			2nd	129
2021年	D-MAX Racing Team	Nissan Silvia (S15)	OKU 12	OKU 1	TSU 3	TSU 2	EBI 5	EBI 3	OKU 5	OKU 3	AUT 5	AUT 10	2nd	169

Sporting positions
Preceded by Hideyuki Fujino	D1 Grand Prix; Series Champion; 2018–2019	Succeeded by Masanori Kohashi
Preceded by Naoki Nakamura	D1 Grand Prix; Series Champion; 2022	Succeeded by Hideyuki Fujino
