= Kuniaki Takahashi =

Japanese professional drifting driver (born 1972)

- Nationality: Japan
- Born: October 27, 1972 (age 54) Yokohama, Kanagawa, Japan
- Retired: 2018

D1 Grand Prix career
- Debut season: 2001

D1 Grand Prix
- Years active: 2001-2018
- Wins: 2
- Best finish: 1st in 2014

Previous series
- Formula Drift; Formula Drift Japan

Kuniaki Takahashi (高橋邦明, Takahashi Kuniaki; born 27 October 1972, Kanagawa Prefecture) is a retired Japanese professional drifting driver. He competed in the D1 Grand Prix series for his own team, Team Kunny'z. Alongside D1, he also competed in Formula Drift Japan events. He currently served as a judge for D1GP.

== Complete drifting results ==
Colour	Result
Gold	Winner
Silver	2nd place
Bronze	3rd place
Green	Last 4 [Semi-final]
Blue	Last 8 [Quarter-final]
Purple	Last 16 (16) [1st Tsuiou Round OR Tandem Battle] (Numbers are given to indicate Top 10 finish)
Black	Disqualified (DSQ) (Given to indicate that the driver has been stripped of their position through disqualification)
White	First Round (TAN) [Tansou OR Qualifying Single Runs]
Red	Did not qualify (DNQ)

- When driver's position are highlighted in blue, this indicates either the driver earned 100pt or 100pt tansou (solo run) bonus has been awarded, with the latter being in use for Pre-2005.

=== D1 Grand Prix ===
Year	Entrant	Car	1	2	3	4	5	6	7	8	Position	Points
2001		Toyota JZX100	EBS; DNQ	NIK; DNQ	BHH; N	EBS; TAN	NIK; N	⇨			-	0
2002		Toyota JZX100	BHH; N	EBS; TAN	SGO; TAN	TKB; DNQ	EBS; DNQ	SEK; N	NIK; N	⇨	-	0
2003		Toyota JZX100	TKB; 10	BHH; 16	SGO; TAN	FUJ; 3	EBS; TAN	SEK; TAN	TKB; 16	⇨	15	18
2004		Toyota JZX100	IRW; TAN	SGO; DNQ	EBS; DNQ	APS; DNQ	ODB; DNQ	EBS; DNQ	TKB; 9	⇨	23	4
2005	Kunny's	Toyota JZX100	IRW; 14	ODB; 16	SGO; TAN	APS; TAN	EBS; TAN	FUJ; TAN	TKB; TAN	⇨	28	2
2006	Kunny's	Toyota JZX100	IRW; DNQ	SGO; TAN	FUJ; TAN	APS; TAN	EBS; TAN	SUZ; TAN	FUJ; TAN	IRW; DNQ	-	0
2007	kunny'z	Toyota JZX100	EBS; TAN	FUJ; TAN	SUZ; TAN	SGO; 9	EBS; TAN	APS; TAN	FUJ; TAN	⇨	22	5
2008	GOODYEAR Racing with Do-Luck	Toyota JZX100	EBS; 6	FUJ; T-23	SUZ; Q-41	OKY; T-27	APS; 7	EBS; Q-24	FUJ; T-19	⇨	17	23
2009	GOODYEAR Racing with DLK	Toyota JZX100	EBS; T-19	APS; 15	OKY; 14	OKY; 11	EBS; T-21	EBS; T-24	FUJ; 8	FUJ; 10	12	28
2010	GOODYEAR Racing with Du-Luck	Toyota JZX100	EBS; 15	APS; 7	OKY; 9	OKY; T-31	EBS; 9	EBS; 14	FUJ; 10	⇨	11	39
2011	GOODYEAR Racing with Kunny'z	Toyota GRX130	ODB; 4	ODB; 2	APS; 7	SUZ; 6	OKY; 7	EBS; 2	EBS; 13	FUJ; 2	3	177
2012	GOODYEAR Racing with Kunny'z	Toyota GRX130	ODB; 10	SUZ; 1	APS; 17	EBS; 3	EBS; 9	CSC; 13	ODB; 7	⇨	3	81
2013	GOODYEAR Racing with Kunny'z	Toyota GRX130	MSI; 8	SUZ; 7	EBS; 8	EBS; 20	HBR; 11	ODB; 16	⇨		15	44
2014	GOODYEAR Racing with Kunny'z	Toyota GRX130	FUJ; 3	SUZ; 3	APS; 1	EBS; 6	EBS; 2	ODB; 14	⇨		1	138.5
2015	GOODYEAR Racing with TOPTUL	Toyota GRX130	ODB; 10	SUZ; 8	EBS; 2	TKB; 16	MSI; 15	ODB; 22	⇨		7	89
2016	GOODYEAR Racing with Kunny'z	Toyota GRX130	ODB; 8	FUJ; 22	TKB; 21	TKB; Q-33	EBS; Q-31	EBS; Q-27	ODB; N	⇨	29	16
2017	GOODYEAR Racing Team Kunny'z	Toyota GRX130	ODB; Q-24	ODB; 7	TKB; Q-18	MSI; Q-24	EBS; Q-27	EBS; Q-21	ODB; N	⇨	27	15
2018	GOODYEAR Racing Team Kunny'z	Toyota GRX130	MSI; R	MSI; N	APS; N	TOK; 21	TKB; Q-20	EBS; 7	EBS; 20	ODB; N	26	17

== Sources ==
- D1 Grand Prix
- Takahashi's D1 Profile
