= Maishima Sports Island =

Park in Osaka, Japan

- 舞洲スポーツアイランド
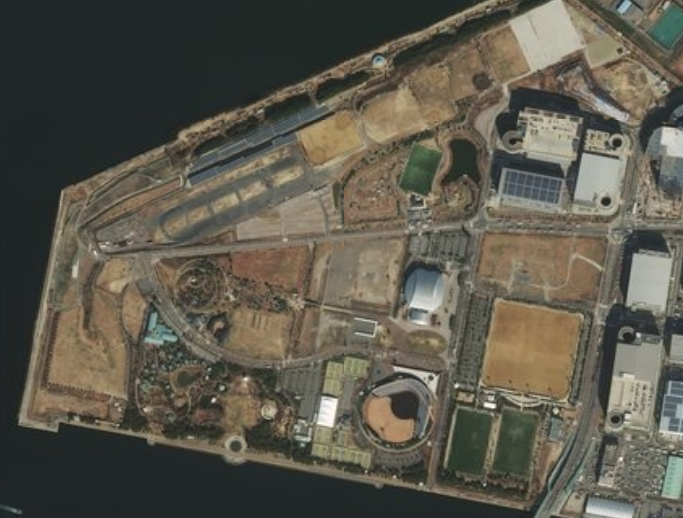

- Location within Osaka Prefecture Location within Japan
- Location: Konohana-ku, Osaka
- Coordinates: 34°39′51″N 135°23′42″E
- Operator: Mizuno
- Open: 1990s
- Website: shisetsu.mizuno.jp/m-7402

The Maishima Sports Island (舞洲スポーツアイランド, Maeshima Supōtsu Airando) is a park with sports facilities in Maishima, Konohana-ku, Osaka, Japan. The official name in the Osaka City Ordinance is Osaka Port Sports Island (Osakakou Sports Island). The facility is owned by the city of Osaka, and is operated and managed by the Mizuno Group (a joint venture of Mizuno, Nankai Building Service, Japan Panause, and Hobby Life) as a designated manager.
