= Nankang Rubber Tire =

Taiwanese tires and rubber manufacturer

Nankang-Rubber Tire Corporation Ltd
- Company type: Public
- Traded as: TWSE: 2101
- Industry: Manufacturing and sales
- Founded: February 25, 1959; 67 years ago
- Headquarters: Taipei, Taiwan
- Key people: Wenxiong Weng (Chairman of the Board)
- Products: Tires and other rubber products
- Revenue: $279.6 million (2005)
- Number of employees: 1,220 (2007)
- Website: http://www.nankang.com.tw/index.php

Nankang Rubber Tire Corp, Ltd (Chinese: 南港輪胎股份有限公司; pinyin: Nángǎng Lúntāi Gǔfèn Yǒuxiàn Gōngsī) is a Taiwanese manufacturer of automobile tires and other synthetic rubber products. The company's products include automotive tires, and tires for light trucks, sedan cars, sport utility vehicles and snowfield-use vehicles. During the year ended 31 December 2006, the company obtained approximately 99% of its total revenue from the automobile tires business. In 2006, the company obtained approximately 35% and 32% of its total revenue from the Americas and Europe, respectively.

== Tires ==
=== History ===
Nankang Rubber Tire Corporation Ltd is the largest established tire manufacturer in Taiwan, having been started in 1940 by a group of engineers. Based originally upon the principles of Japanese manufacturing technologies, the company has grown substantially. Its two Taiwanese plants (Nankang and Hsinfung) continue to manufacture the bulk of Nankang's product. September 2003 marked the commencement of production at Nankang's Jiangsu facility in China. This expansion ensures economies of scale for the future development of Nankang's product range. It manufactures tires for brands such as Geostar, Milestar, and Provato.

== Global markets ==
Today, Nankang tires are exported from Taiwan to over 100 markets worldwide. Tires are supplied to more than 300 distributors throughout Europe, North America, Central and South America, Asia, Africa, the Middle East and Australia.

== See also ==
- List of companies of Taiwan
- List of tire companies
