= Takahiro Ueno =

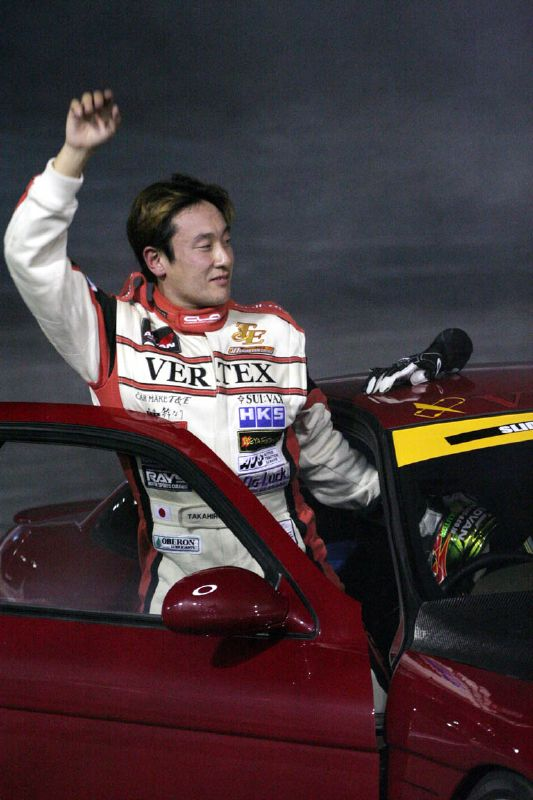
- Ueno in 2007
- Nationality: Japan
- Born: 5 November 1971 (age 55) Hokkaido, Japan

D1 Grand Prix career
- Debut season: 2001
- Current team: TEAM VERTEX SAILUN TIRE
- Wins: 1
- Best finish: 3rd in 2001

Previous series
- (previous series with line breaks)

Championship titles
- (championship titles)

Takahiro Ueno (上野高広, Ueno Takahiro; born 5 November 1971, Hokkaido) is a Japanese professional drifting driver and businessman, the former, currently competing in the D1 Grand Prix series for Car Make T&E.

Ueno started his career with a Toyota Soarer JZZ30. Starting his Tuning shop Car Make T&E in October 1996. Founding the aero part branch, Vertex, he personally approves every new design. Most of the company's time when it was starting out was spent on developing the Toyota Soarer JZZ30 and this still continues today, using the D1 Grand Prix as a showcase.

Ueno began competing in the D1 Grand Prix in his Toyota Soarer JZZ30 in the first round in 2001. Going on to win round 4 of the season and finishing in third overall in the championship. He has gone on to score points in every year since, though has never quite matched his original success.

From 2009 to 2015, Ueno had used BMW M3 (E92).

In 2016, Ueno celebrated the 20th anniversary of Car Make T&E, as he started using Toyota Soarer JZZ30 again.

Currently, Ueno has been competing in the D1GP, driving Lexus RC since 2019.

== Complete Drifting Results ==
Colour	Result
Gold	Winner
Silver	2nd place
Bronze	3rd place
Green	Last 4 [Semi-final]
Blue	Last 8 [Quarter-final]
Purple	Last 16 (16) [1st Tsuiou Round OR Tandem Battle] (Numbers are given to indicate Top 10 finish)
Black	Disqualified (DSQ) (Given to indicate that the driver has been stripped of their position through disqualification)
White	First Round (TAN) [Tansou OR Qualifying Single Runs]
Red	Did not qualify (DNQ)

- When driver's position are highlighted in blue, this indicates either the driver earned 100pt or 100pt tansou (solo run) bonus has been awarded, with the latter being in use for Pre-2005.

=== D1 Grand Prix ===
Year	Entrant	Car	1	2	3	4	5	6	7	8	Position	Points
2001	Car Make T&E	Toyota Soarer JZZ30	EBS; 2	NIK; 4	BHH; TAN	EBS; 1	NIK; TAN				3	52
2002	Car Make T&E	Toyota Soarer JZZ30	BHH; TAN	EBS; 5	SGO; TAN	TKB; DNQ	EBS; TAN	SEK; TAN	NIK; 16		24	12
2003	Car Make T&E	Toyota Soarer JZZ30	TKB; 9	BHH; TAN	SGO; TAN	FUJ; TAN	EBS; DNQ	SEK; DNQ	TKB; DNQ		22	4
2004	Car Make T&E	Toyota Soarer JZZ30	IRW; DNQ	SGO; 7	EBS; 16	APS; TAN	ODB; DNQ	EBS; TAN	TKB; 5		11	20
2005	Car Make T&E	Toyota Soarer JZZ30	IRW; 3	ODB; TAN	SGO; TAN	APS; 16	EBS; DNQ	FUJ; DNQ	TKB; 16		15	18
2006	Car Make T&E	Toyota Soarer JZZ30	IRW; 8	SGO; 10	FUJ; TAN	APS; TAN	EBS; TAN	SUZ; TAN	FUJ; 16	IRW	22	10
2007	Car Make T&E	Toyota Soarer JZZ30	EBS; 10	FUJ; 15	SUZ; TAN	SGO; 11	EBS; TAN	APS; 2	FUJ; 9		11	29
2008	Car Make T&E	Toyota Soarer JZZ30	EBS; 5	FUJ; 10	SUZ; 7	OKY; 10	APS; 13	EBS	FUJ		9	43

== Sources ==
- D1 Grand Prix
