= Toyota Chaser =

Mid-size performance car

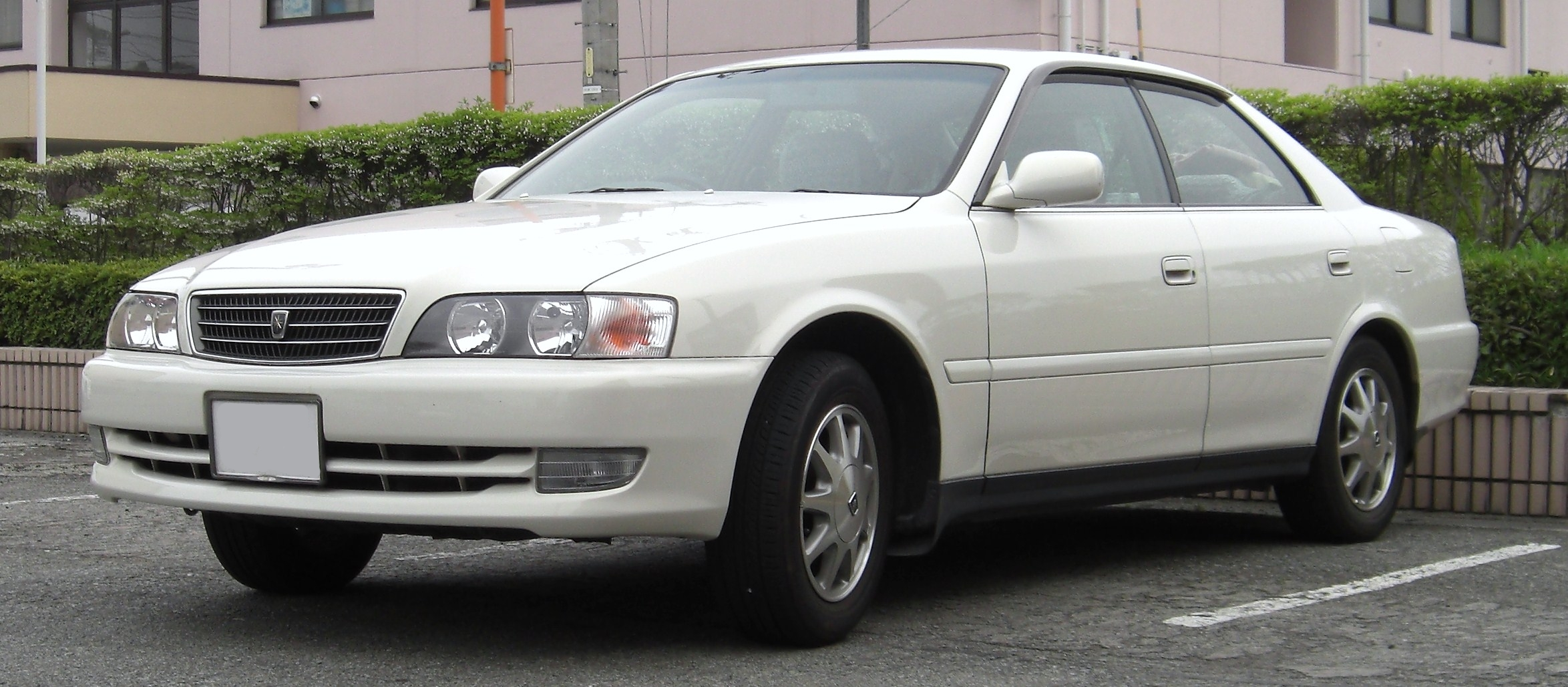
- 1996-1998 Toyota Chaser Avante (JZX100)

Overview
- Manufacturer: Toyota
- Production: 1977–2001

Body and chassis
- Class: Compact (1977–1980); Mid-size (1980–2001)

Chronology
- Predecessor: Toyota Mark II GSS
- Successor: Toyota Verossa

The Toyota Chaser (Japanese: トヨタ・チェイサー, Hepburn: Toyota Cheisā) is a mid-size car produced by Toyota. In the beginning, Chasers were four-door sedans and hardtop sedans; a two-door coupé was available only for the first generation. It was introduced on the Toyota Mark II (X30) platform and was only available at Japanese Toyota Auto Store dealerships as their top-level model. The Chaser was produced for six generations; production ceased in 2001 when both it and the Cresta were replaced by the short-lived Verossa.

The Chaser was one of Toyota's "triplet sedans": it, the Mark II, and the Cresta are rebadged models of the same car, sold through different dealership sales channels. The Chaser and its platform sisters are considered a class below the Crown. The Chaser offered a sportier image than the Mark II or the more luxury-oriented Cresta.

The Chaser's performance reputation benefited as the series and generations offered ever-increasing engine displacement. The addition of turbochargers and superchargers to growing engine displacement was offset by the fact that the Japanese government taxed and regulated vehicle emission results. Larger engines offered more luxury, convenience, and suspension improvements as the generations progressed. Toyota chose not to install V6 engines in the Chaser for the entire series.

== First generation (X30, X40; 1977-1980) ==
Toyota Chaser
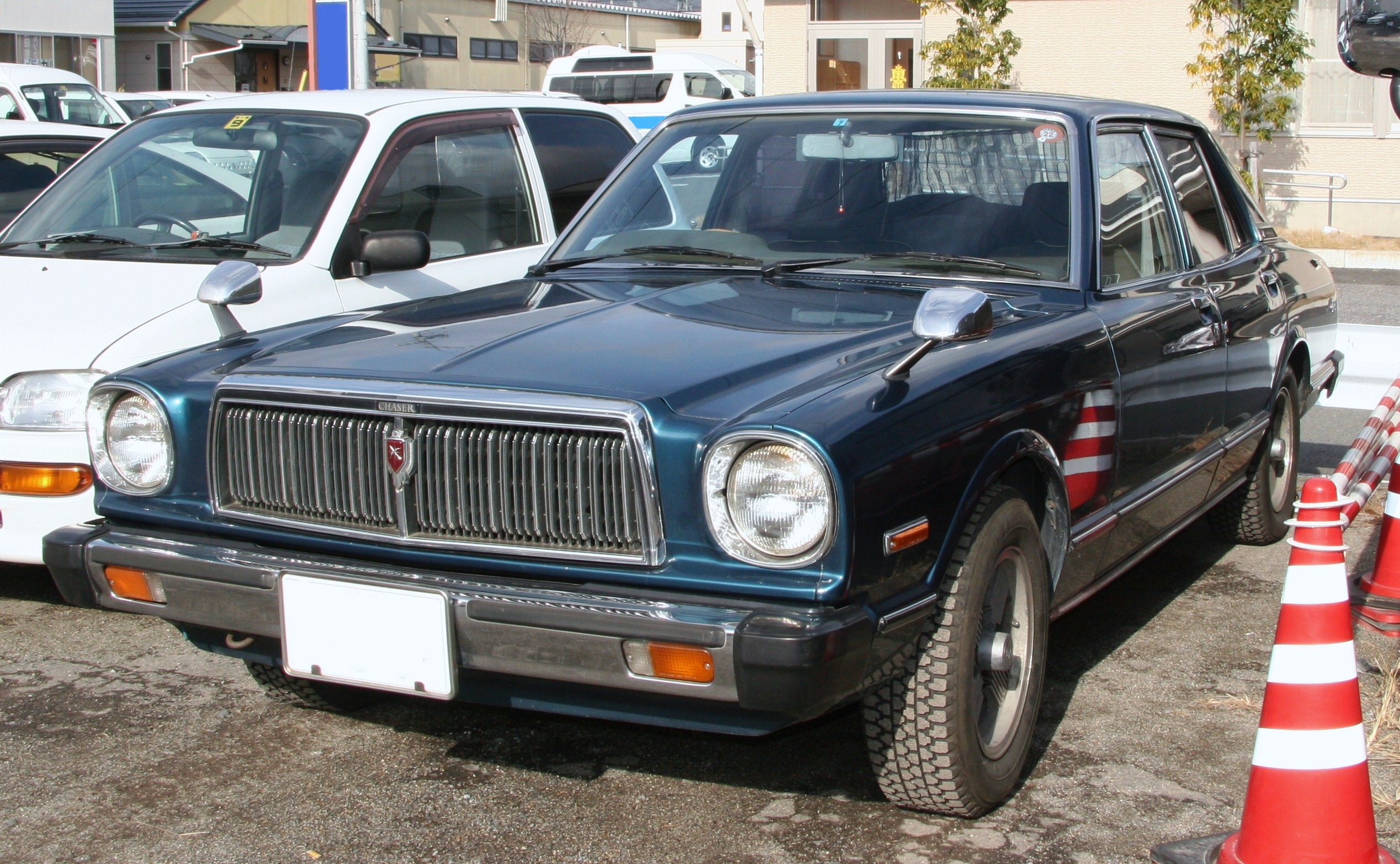
- Toyota Chaser 2000 XL sedan

Overview
- Model code: X30 X40
- Production: 1977–1980
- Assembly: Toyota, Aichi, Japan (Motomachi plant)

Body and chassis
- Body style: 4-door sedan; 2-door hardtop coupé
- Layout: Front engine, rear-wheel drive
- Related: Toyota Mark II/Cressida (X30)

Powertrain
- Engine: 1.8 L 3T-U I4 (TX30); 1.8 L 13T-U I4 (TX40); 2.0 L 18R-U I4 (RX30/31); 2.0 L 21R-C/U I4 (RX40/41); 2.0 L M-U/M-EU I6 (MX30/40/41)
- Transmission: 4/5-speed manual; 3-speed automatic

Dimensions
- Wheelbase: 2,645 mm (104.1 in)
- Length: 4,500–4,530 mm (177.2–178.3 in)
- Width: 1,670–1,680 mm (66–66 in)
- Height: 1,390–1,415 mm (54.7–55.7 in)
- Curb weight: 1,050–1,175 kg (2,315–2,590 lb)

The Chaser was first produced in July 1977 with chassis codes X30, X31, X40 and X41, and evolved from the X20 generation Mark II GSS hardtop coupé. The X30-series chassis numbers were the original codes shared with the third-generation Mark II, with X40 numbers gradually introduced about halfway through the model's life for cars that could pass the new emissions rules. All vehicles sold with Toyota's TTC-C technology had a badge on the boot lid to indicate it complied with the Japanese Government's Clean Air Act of 1975. It was powered by the four-cylinder 1.8-liter 3T-U, 13T-U, and 2-liter 18R-U, and the six-cylinder 2.0 L M-U and M-EU engines – all single cam engines tuned for economy and clean emissions rather than performance. The M-EU engine came standard with multi-port electronic fuel injection and was Toyota's first engine which could meet the upcoming 1978 emissions standards.

The Chaser is a lightly redesigned Toyota Mark II, with a wider front grille and without parking lights. The Chaser also has taillights of a different design; at the inside the only noticeable change was rectangular rather than round gauges on the instrument panel. Unlike the Mark II, there were no station wagons or commercial models offered of the Chaser. This was the only Chaser to be offered as a two-door, with the coupé bodystyle being replaced by the Soarer after this generation.

To provide buyers with a luxury sports sedan while minimizing tax consequences, the vehicle was limited to an engine size of 2000 cc as well as dimensions under 4.7 m (15.4 ft) long and 1.7 m (5.6 ft) wide. Engine displacements of 1.8 L and 2.0 L were offered to keep the annual road tax bill affordable to Japanese buyers, and the wheelbase was the same for both the two- and four-door. The Chaser was offered as a competitor to the Nissan Skyline coupé and sedan and the Mazda Cosmo. The front suspension was an independent MacPherson strut, and the standard rear suspension was a 4-link system, with top trim packages adopting an independent semi-trailing arm system instead. The models with four-wheel independent suspension also came with disc brakes all around. All body styles were now integrated with a safety cage with crumple zones for the front and rear, a body-on-frame chassis was abandoned, and unitary construction was now used.

The first Chaser came with power express down for the driver's window, a tilt steering wheel, a system monitor that would inform if the disc brake lining needed to be serviced, an AM/FM Stereo radio with four speakers, and a separately available cassette player or 8-track cassette, full instrumentation including a volt meter and oil pressure, cruise control, and the rear seatback that could fold down to accommodate long items in the trunk. The Chaser received a new windshield wiper and headlight switch layout, with the controls operated by levers attached to the steering column as is typical nowadays. Wipers were two-speed with intermittent wipe, a rear wiper was also available for the upper trim level packages.

The performance image was shared with the 1972 Sprinter Trueno, followed by the 1978 Toyota Celica XX and the 1980 Celica Camry. It shared the 2.0-litre M-EU inline-six engine with the Celica XX. The Celica XX was the top-level car exclusive to Toyota Corolla Store with the Celica Camry, then August 1980 the Celica Camry was also added to Toyota Vista Store with the more upscale Cresta.

- Hardtop coupé trim packages
  - SG Touring, SGS, SXL, GS, XL
- Sedan trim packages
  - SG Touring, SGS, GS, XL, DX

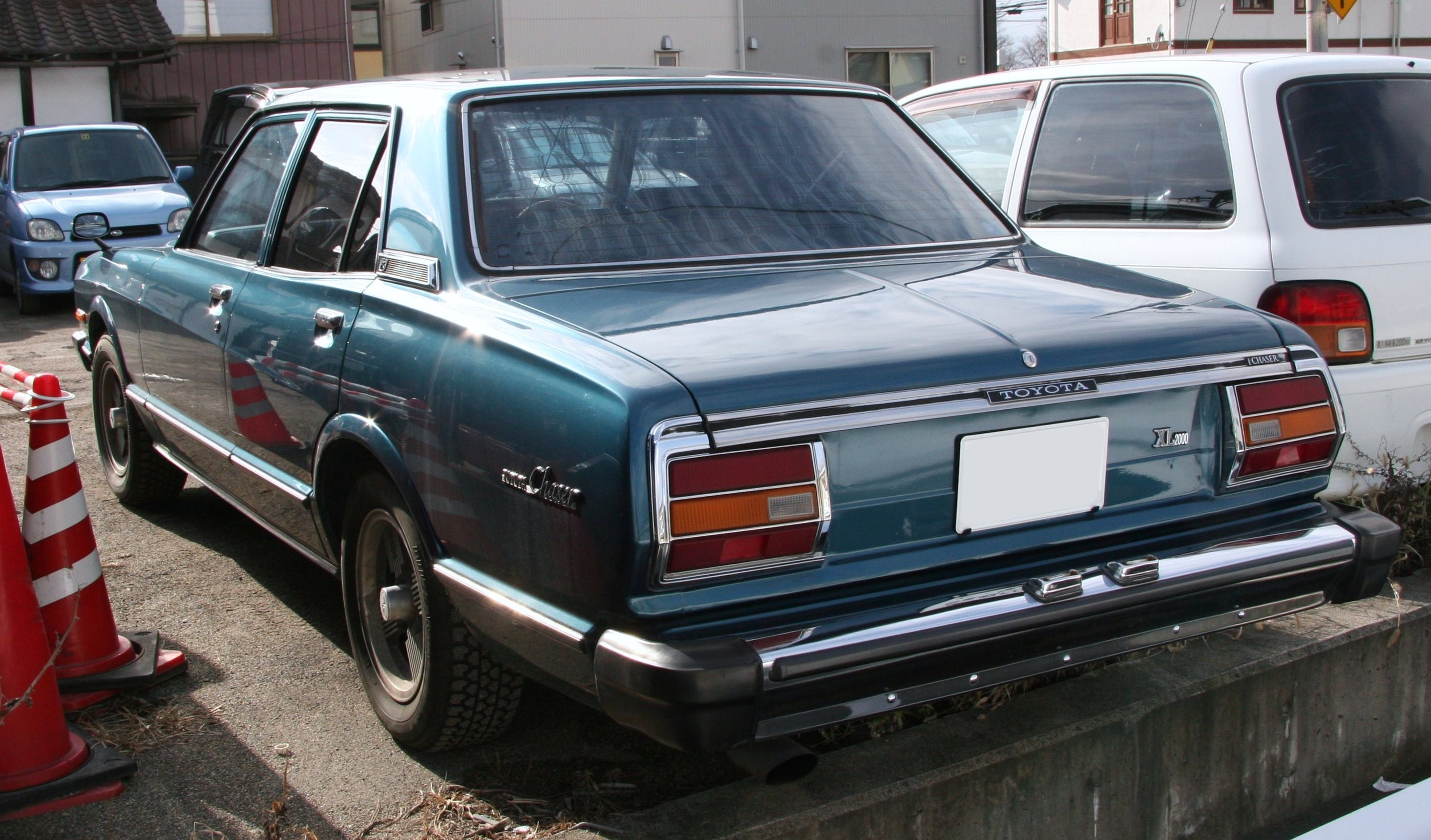
Toyota Chaser 2000 XL sedan (rear)

== Second generation (X60; 1980-1984) ==
Toyota Chaser
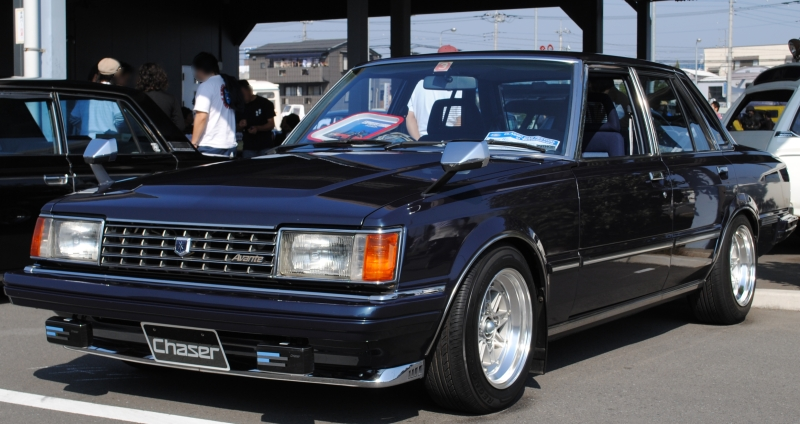
- Toyota Chaser Avante sedan (GX61)

Overview
- Model code: X60
- Production: October 1980 – 1984
- Assembly: Susono, Shizuoka (Higashi Fuji); (Kanto Auto Works)

Body and chassis
- Body style: 4-door sedan; 4-door pillared hardtop sedan
- Layout: Front engine, rear-wheel drive
- Related: Toyota Mark II (X60); Toyota Cressida (export); Toyota Cresta (X50)

Powertrain
- Engine: Petrol: 1770 cc 13T-U I4 (TX60); 1832 cc 1S I4 (SX60); 2.0 L 18R-GEU I4 (RX63); 2.0 L 21R-U I4 (RX60); 2.0 L M-TEU turbo I6 (MX61); 2.0 L 1G-EU I6 (GX60/61); 2.0 L 1G-GEU I6 (GX61); Diesel: 2188 cc L I4 (LX60); 2446 cc 2L-TE I4 (LX65)
- Transmission: 4-speed manual; 5-speed W58 manual; 3-speed automatic; 4-speed A40D automatic

Dimensions
- Wheelbase: 2,645 mm (104.1 in)
- Length: 4,640 mm (183 in) (hardtop); 4,480 mm (176 in) (sedan)
- Width: 1,690 mm (67 in) (hardtop); 1,670 mm (66 in) (sedan)
- Height: 1,390 mm (55 in) (hardtop); 1,375 mm (54.1 in) (sedan)
- Curb weight: 1,055–1,220 kg (2,326–2,690 lb)

The X60 Chaser began sales in October 1980, with the addition of the new 2.0-liter six-cylinder multi-port fuel injected 1G-EU single cam gasoline engine and a 2.2 L four-cylinder L-series diesel engine. The Chaser continued as the performance sedan and shared many technical improvements introduced on the Celica XX.

Body styles offered were a four-door sedan or 4-door pillared hardtop, and no longer offered the 2-door hardtop, which was replaced by the all-new luxury coupé Toyota Soarer. The top trim package "Avante" was introduced and remained until the Chaser was discontinued in 2001; "avante" is Latin and means to go forward or to lead ahead. The lower-priced XL and DX received flat bumpers which shortened their overall length.

The cloth-only interior offered a power-adjustable driver's seat with lumbar support. The rear seat had a fold-down armrest and a 60/40 split rear seatback that could accommodate longer items. Each trim package offered seven exterior colors, and one two-tone color choice of dark gray over silver was only available on the Avante. Interior color choices of blue, gray, or brown were offered, but each trim package had a unique upholstery pattern in cloth, and leather was unavailable. The body color dictated the interior color unless specially ordered, and the availability of standard equipment for each trim package grew as the selection was elevated.

The front suspension consisted of MacPherson struts with a lower control arm, and the rear suspension used a semi-trailing arm with coil springs and separately installed shock absorbers. Four-wheel ventilated disc brakes and speed-sensitive power rack-and-pinion steering were standard. Fourteen-inch aluminum alloy wheels were standard on the Avante and SG Touring trim packages while thirteen-inch steel wheels were installed on other trim packages. The Avante was available with ESC (Electronic Skid Control) and was later added to other trim packages over time.

Optional items included several sound system choices, including an AM/FM stereo cassette with integrated equalizer, a trip computer, power windows with standard-equipped express down for the driver's window, glass sunroof, cruise control, digital clock with an alarm feature, a rear window wiper with electric defrost, headlight washers for the halogen headlights, and three-point seatbelts for front and rear passengers with ELR safety lock-down in case of a collision.

This generation saw the introduction of a new companion, the Cresta, to compete with the Laurel, while the Chaser continued to be the alternative to the Skyline.

In August 1982, the 2.0 L 6-cylinder 1G-GEU twincam with the new engine family name LASREα (lightweight, advanced, super response, and engine) was added, and the series R and M engines were phased out. In 1980, the Celica Camry, which was offered at Toyota Corolla Store and Toyota Auto Store, was renamed the Toyota Vista and a new dealership, Toyota Vista Store was created for the Vista.

- Hardtop trim packages
  - Avante, SG Touring, SXL, GT, XG, XL
- Sedan trim packages
  - Avante, SG Touring, SXL, GT, XG, XL, DX
- Diesel Sedan trim packages
  - XL-Extra, XL, DX

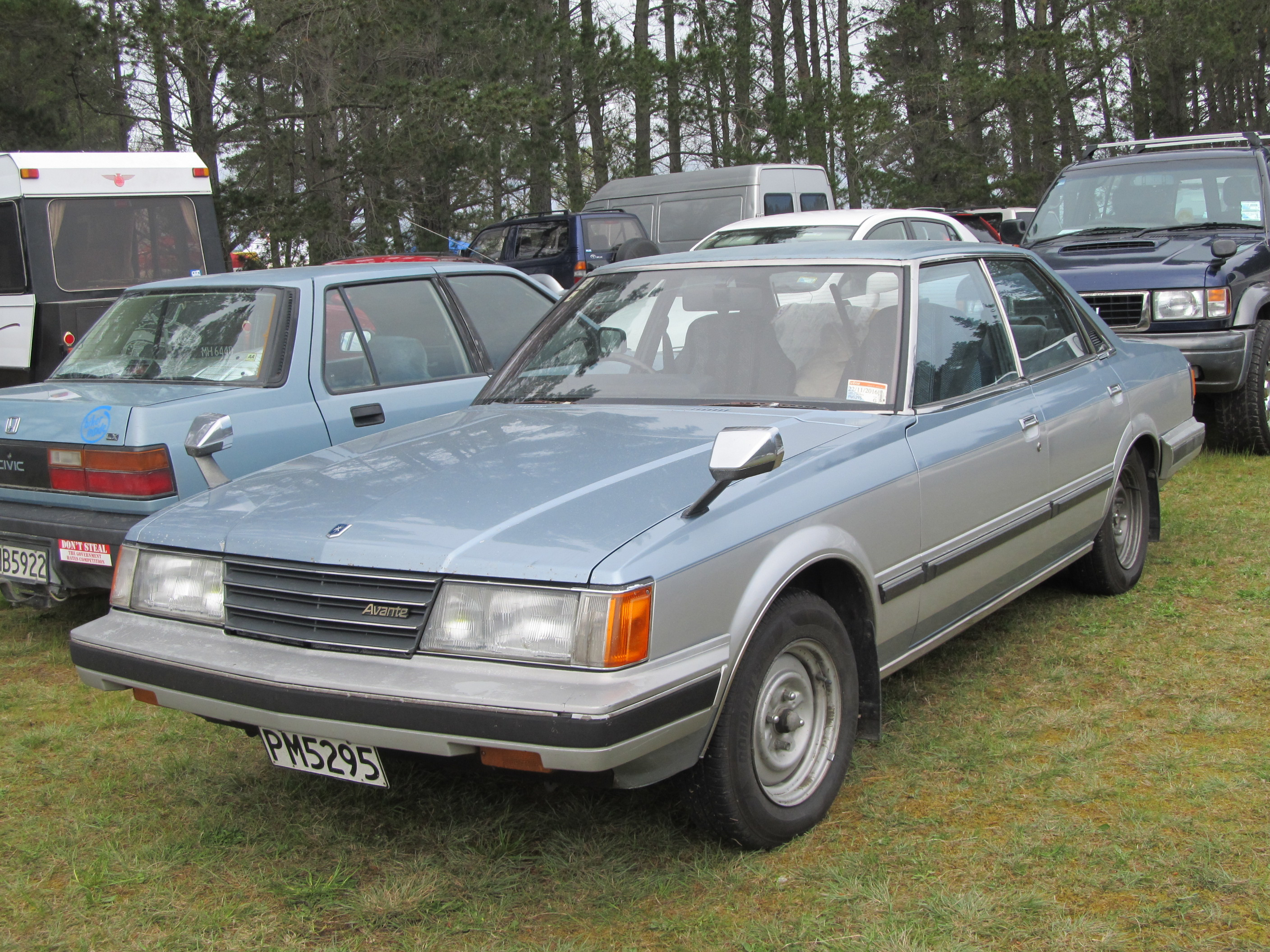
Toyota Chaser Avante hardtop sedan (GX61, facelift)

== Third generation (X70; 1984–1988) ==
Toyota Chaser
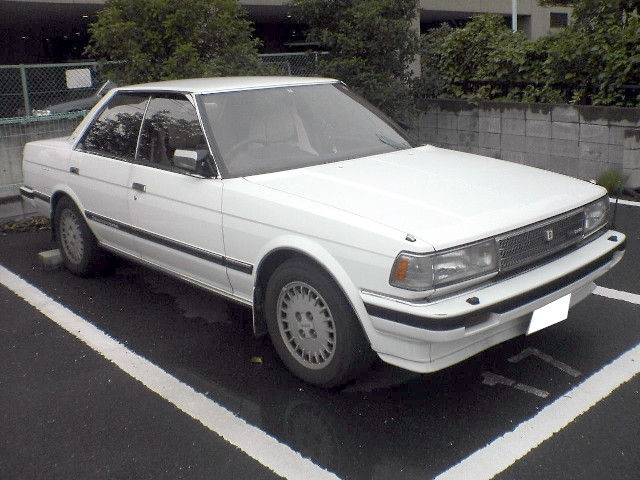
- Toyota Chaser 2.0 GT Twin Turbo (GX71)

Overview
- Model code: X70
- Production: 1984–1988
- Assembly: Susono, Shizuoka (Higashi Fuji); (Kanto Auto Works)

Body and chassis
- Body style: 4-door pillared hardtop sedan
- Layout: Front engine, rear-wheel drive
- Related: Toyota Cressida (export); Toyota Cresta (X70); Toyota Mark II (X70)

Powertrain
- Engine: petrol: 2.0 L 3Y-PU I4 (LPG); 2.0 L 1G-GEU I6; 2.0 L 1G-GTEU twin-turbo I6; diesel: 2.4 L 2L I4; 2.4 L 2L-T TD I4
- Transmission: 4-speed manual; 5-speed W58 manual; 4-speed A43DE automatic; 4-speed A340E automatic

Dimensions
- Wheelbase: 2,660 mm (105 in)
- Length: 4,630 mm (182 in); 4,560 mm (180 in) (XL)
- Width: 1,690 mm (67 in)
- Height: 1,385 mm (54.5 in)
- Curb weight: 1,712 kg (3,774 lb)

This series first appeared in August 1984, and the hardtop body style was the only one offered. This car's exterior dimensions were slightly smaller than those of the sister cars, Mark II and Cresta. Still, the Chaser was more performance-oriented while maintaining the Cresta's advanced features and luxurious interior. In October 1985, the 1G-GTEU parallel twin turbo was installed in the trim package "GT TWIN TURBO," which was a trim package name shared with the Cresta. Disc brakes are larger in diameter, and it was now equipped with bucket seats, borrowed from the Supra (A60) to distinguish that the Chaser was a performance sedan and set it apart from the luxurious Cresta. The Cresta, Chaser, and Mark II would now share a model code for the entire production series. The Chaser was marketed for the growing private ownership market, while the Crown offered additional amenities focused toward chauffeur-driven corporate ownership and premium-level taxi service. Side turn signal lights were installed above the headlights to enhance pedestrian safety.

The 1G-GEU engine received various improvements, while the LPG-powered engine was changed to the 3Y-PU. As for appearance, larger bumpers and a new front grille accompanied substantial changes to the equipment. The early type rear combination lamps were kept with minor revisions. The TEMS installation shared the same settings used in the 1986 Soarer and 1986 Supra (A70) to remain consistent with its performance-focused market position. The four-wheel independent suspension was improved and given the name PEGASUS, which first appeared on the Soarer. The "GT TWIN TURBO S" was only available with a 5-speed manual transmission. There were three kinds of four-speed automatic transmissions on offer labeled as ECT-S. The conventional automatic for the 1800 and turbodiesel engines (the naturally aspirated diesel did not come with an automatic option), a four-speed with a two-way overdrive for the 2-litre petrol engine, and an electronically controlled overdrive unit for the twin cam and turbo models. The ECT-S setting was linked to the TEMS setting, and the vehicle speed-sensitive power steering was modified.

Optional items introduced from the previous generation continued while new enhancements appeared. The trip computer was now integrated into a digital instrument cluster, which incorporated the TEMS setting and the ECT-S gear selection to include whether the transmission was in "Normal," "Power," or "Econ" settings and whether the overdrive was disengaged. Six different stereo choices were offered along with simple satellite controls on the left side of the instrument cluster within reach of the driver's hand that controlled stereo volume, fan speed, and airflow direction, an illuminated ignition key slot, power-folding side-view mirrors installed on the doors, fully automatic climate control, and an air purification system installed behind the rear seats. Bucket seats, borrowed from the Supra (A60), were only available on GT Twin Turbo trim packages.

In January 1987, the "Avante Lordly" variant was released, and in September 1987, new versions of the 2L and 2L-T diesel engines complying with the 1986 car emissions standards were introduced. In January 1988 the "Avante Supra" special edition was released as a companion to the updated, third-generation Supra (A70).

- Trim packages (2.0L and 1.8L)
  - XL (1.8L), XG (1.8L), XG-Extra (1.8L), SXL (2.0L), Avante (2.0L), Avante TwinCam (2.0L), Avante Turbo (2.0L), GT Twin Turbo (2.0L)
- Diesel Sedan trim packages
  - XL (diesel and turbodiesel), XG (turbodiesel)

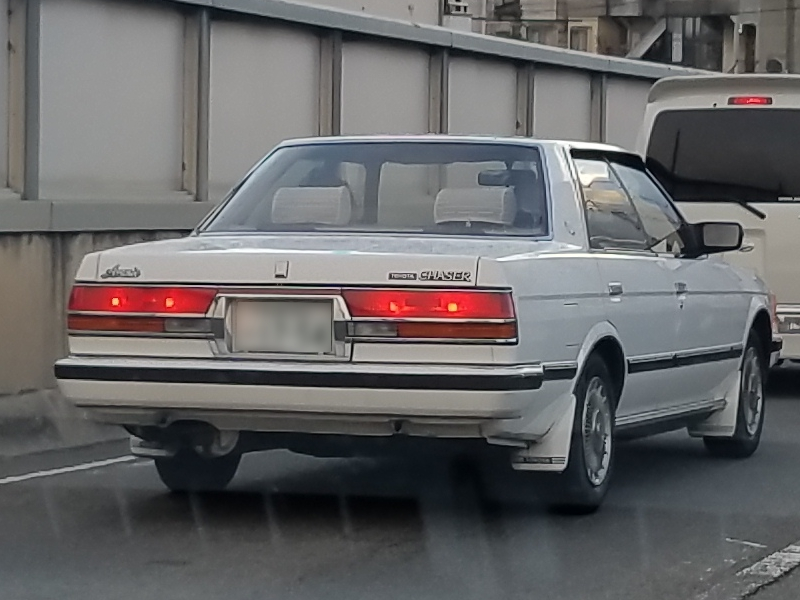
Toyota Chaser 2.0 Avante (GX71)

== Fourth generation (X80; 1988–1992) ==
Toyota Chaser
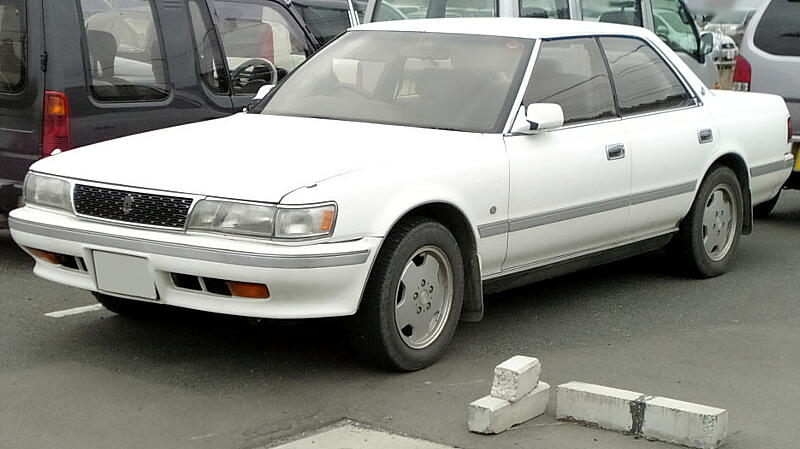
- Facelift Toyota Chaser Avante G (Japan)

Overview
- Model code: X80
- Production: 1988–1992
- Assembly: Susono, Shizuoka (Higashi Fuji); (Kanto Auto Works)

Body and chassis
- Body style: 4-door pillared hardtop sedan
- Layout: Front engine, rear-wheel drive
- Related: Toyota Cressida (export); Toyota Cresta (X80); Toyota Mark II (X80)

Powertrain
- Engine: 1.8 L 4S-FE I4; 2.0 L 1G-GTE twin-turbo I6; 2.0 L 1G-GZE s/c I6; 2.5 L 1JZ-GE I6; 2.5 L 1JZ-GTE twin-turbo I6; 3.0 L 7M-GE I6 (1988-1990); 3.0 L 2JZ-GE I6 (1990-1992); diesel: 2.4 L 2L-TE turbo diesel I4
- Transmission: 5-speed R154 manual; 5-speed W57 manual; 4-speed A40D automatic

Dimensions
- Wheelbase: 2,680 mm (105.5 in)
- Length: 4,690 mm (184.6 in)
- Width: 1,695 mm (66.7 in)
- Height: 1,370 mm (54.1 in)
- Curb weight: 1,420 kg (3,131 lb)

In August 1988, the X81 series of Chasers were introduced to the Japanese market. The GT Twin Turbo model was now the most powerful variant, powered by the 1G-GTE engine putting out 210 PS (154 kW; 207 hp) at 6200 rpm. The Avante G model was the highest special edition model in terms of equipment. In August 1989, two more models were added to the Avante lineup: the Avante G-L and the top-level Avante G. The Chaser was no longer the top-level car at Toyota Auto Store after the Toyota Aristo was introduced in 1991.

This generation introduced a visual distinction: the Chaser was only available as a pillared hardtop, the Cresta was only a sedan, and the Mark II offered both body styles. Exterior dimensions increased to the maximum limit under Japanese government dimension regulations and now matched the Crown. To reduce weight and improve structural rigidity, High-tensile steel was used in key areas and the suspension. Five studs were added to each wheel to cope with the additional torque from the larger engines.

The top-of-the-line model, called "Avante G" had two variants. The base variant "2.0 Avante G" included a supercharger equipped 2.0 L 1G-GZE straight six engine, while the "3.0 Avante G" included the 3.0 L 7M-GE straight six shared with the Soarer. The supercharger was belt-driven but actuated by an electromagnetic clutch so that it would not be driven except when needed, increasing fuel economy.

The suspension continued to offer MacPherson struts for the front, but the rear suspension was upgraded to a new double-wishbone design. The optional TEMS electronic shock absorbers and specially modified MacPherson struts were available on the top-level trim package Avante G. The new rear suspension was shared with the Soarer, including a limited-slip differential on the GT Twin Turbo. ESC anti-lock brakes and the ECT-S automatic transmission continued and was available on more trim packages.

The options list continued to offer the digital instrument cluster, front and rear parking sensors, and seven AM/FM stereos with available cassette players could be selected, along with a CD player. The stereo controls were separated by a second row of switches just above the automatic climate control that performed simple functions. A trunk-mounted spoiler with a third brake light could be added. The cloth upholstery was unique to each trim package but without leather. The sport bucket seats used in the Toyota Supra (A70) were offered only on GT Twin Turbo equipped cars.

In August 1990, major revisions were made to the Chaser lineup, including a revised grille and headlights. Some of the models received entirely new engines: The top-range Avante G and GT Twin Turbo received the new 2.5-litre 1JZ engine, which was shared with the JZA70 Supra. The Avante G 2.5 received a normally aspirated 1JZ-GE engine with a maximum 180 PS (132 kW; 178 hp) at 6000 rpm, while the GT Twin Turbo received the parallel twin-turbo 1JZ-GTE capable of 280 PS (206 kW; 276 hp) at 6200 rpm, the maximum horsepower allowed under Japanese regulations. The 3.0 Avante G with the normally aspirated 7M-GE engine was the last generation that used the venerable Toyota M engine. In 1990 the 3.0 Avante G came with the 2JZ-GE. The Avante 2.5 and 3.0-litre engines incurred more annual road tax and came equipped with optional items on other trim packages as standard to compensate for the ownership costs.

- Trim packages (petrol):
  - XL (1.8L), XG (1.8L), Raffine (1.8L), SXL (2.0L), Avante (2.0L), Avante TwinCam24 (2.0L), GT Twin Turbo (2.0/2.5L), Avante G (2.0/2.5/3.0L)
- Diesel trim package:
  - XL (turbodiesel)
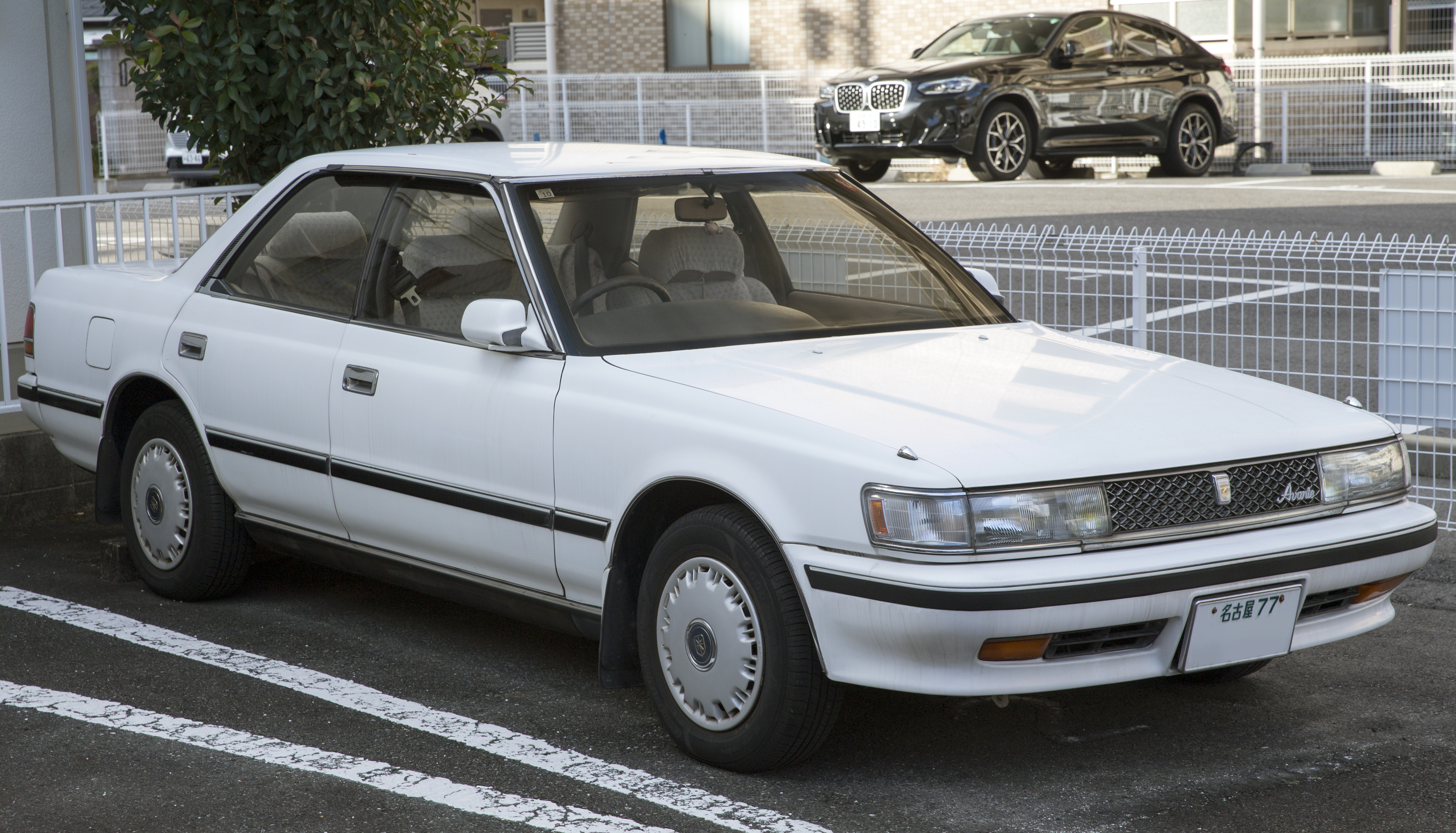
Toyota Chaser 2.0 Avante (GX81; pre-facelift)

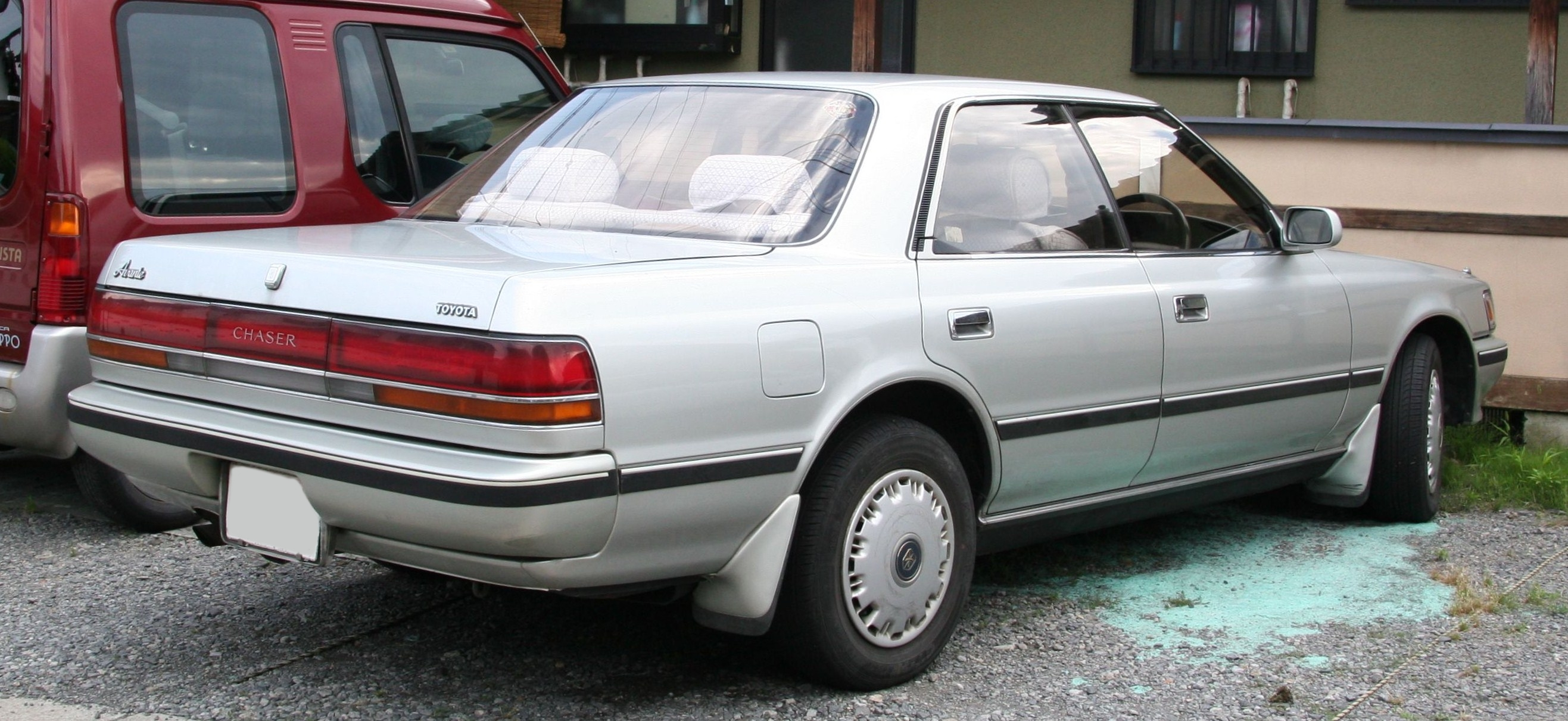
Rear of Toyota Chaser 2.0 Avante (GX81; pre-facelift)

== Fifth generation (X90; 1992–1996) ==
Toyota Chaser
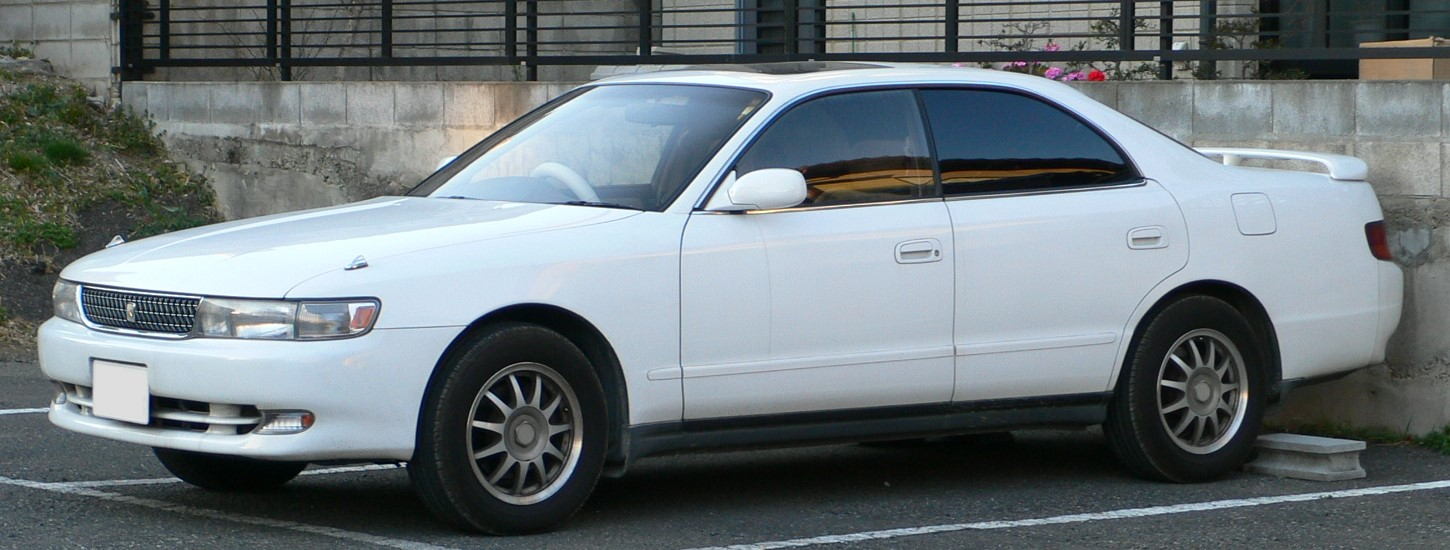
- Pre-facelift 1992 Toyota Chaser Tourer (JZX90)

Overview
- Model code: X90
- Production: October 1992 – September 1996
- Assembly: Susono, Shizuoka (Higashi Fuji); (Kanto Auto Works)

Body and chassis
- Body style: 4-door pillared hardtop sedan
- Layout: Front engine, rear-wheel drive; Front engine, all-wheel drive
- Related: Toyota Cresta (X90); Toyota Mark II (X90)

Powertrain
- Engine: 1.8 L 4S-FE I4; 2.0 L 1G-FE I6; 2.5 L 1JZ-GE I6; 2.5 L 1JZ-GTE Twin-turbo I6; 3.0 L 2JZ-GE I6; diesel: 2.4 L 2L-TE turbo-diesel I4
- Transmission: 5-speed R154 manual; 5-speed W57 manual; 4-speed A340E automatic

Dimensions
- Wheelbase: 2,730 mm (107 in)
- Length: 4,750 mm (187 in)
- Width: 1,750 mm (68.9 in)
- Height: 1,390 mm (54.7 in)
- Curb weight: 1,450 kg (3,197 lb)

In October 1992, the X90 Chaser replaced the previous X81 Chaser. It had a larger body, better handling, and more engine power. The body was curvier, and the car was significantly longer. With the introduction of the Third Generation Soarer, the exterior of the Chaser was more visually aligned with the Toyota Aristo, which was now the senior luxury sedan at Toyota Auto Store locations, while retaining the pillared hardtop appearance. The top-of-the-line Avante G model received a 220 PS (162 kW; 217 hp) natural aspirated 2JZ-GE, the next evolution of the JZ series of engines after the 1JZ. Exterior dimensions exceeded the maximum limit under Japanese government dimension regulations, and buyers now paid more yearly taxes, contributing to diminished sales.

The Tourer V was equipped with the 1JZ-GTE twin-turbo engine, the most potent offering, while the Tourer S trim received the non-turbo 1JZ-GE; the Tourer package replaced the trim package "GT." Manual transmissions were optional for all engine offerings, from the 1.8-liter 4S-FE and 2.4 turbodiesel 2L-TE up through the 2.0-liter 1G-FE and 2.5-liter 1JZ-GE straight-sixes. In September 1992, the Tourer models received equipment upgrades, although not to the level of the Avante G, and their prices were correspondingly higher. The traditional MacPherson strut front suspension added double wishbone technology with this series.

Permanent all-wheel-drive, called i-Four, was offered as an option in 1993 to stay competitive with the Nissan Skyline GTS sedan. The system typically provided 30 percent to the front and 70 percent to the rear wheels, incorporating a center differential lock feature. It was described as a safety feature linked to the anti-lock brakes, traction control, electronically controlled transmission, and electronic fuel injection, and it was offered on the Avante Four trim package. Supplementing the safety enhancement, a driver-side airbag was now standard for all trim packages. The ECT electronically controlled automatic transmission and a limited-slip differential (LSD) unit were now standard on all rear-drive drivetrain installations.

The Avante G was available with Electro MultiVision, a 6-inch color LCD screen that displayed TV broadcasts, stereo settings, climate control settings, fuel economy and cruising range, and maintenance reminders. This was the first version to offer a touch-sensitive screen, which was previously introduced in the Crown. CD-ROM updated maps, and VICS local traffic conditions were integrated, and GPS location information was used to display the vehicle's position. Four stereo choices were offered, including two different versions that provided an in-dash CD player, along with DSP (Digital Sound Processing) that would modify the sound to simulate different venues. Ten speakers were available, including a subwoofer. Front and rear parking sensors, remote keyless entry, cellular phone handset in the front armrest with hands-free voice dialing, and the first-time leather interior was offered, were all optional equipment.

After the X80 generation, the export-market Cressida retired, and the X90 (in Mark II, Chaser, or Cresta guises) was only offered in the Japanese home market. Each member of the Mark II family supposedly had different characteristics—the Chaser was a pillared hardtop geared towards sporty driving, the Cresta was a stylish opulent luxury sedan, and the Mark II was a traditional luxury sedan.

- Trim packages (3.0L, 2.5L, 2.0L and 1.8L)
  - 3.0 Avante G, 2.5 Avante G, 2.5 Tourer V, 2.5 Tourer S, 2.5 Avante, 2.5 Avante Four, 2.0 Avante, 1.8 Raffine, 1.8 XL
- Diesel Sedan trim packages
  - Raffine, XL (turbodiesel)

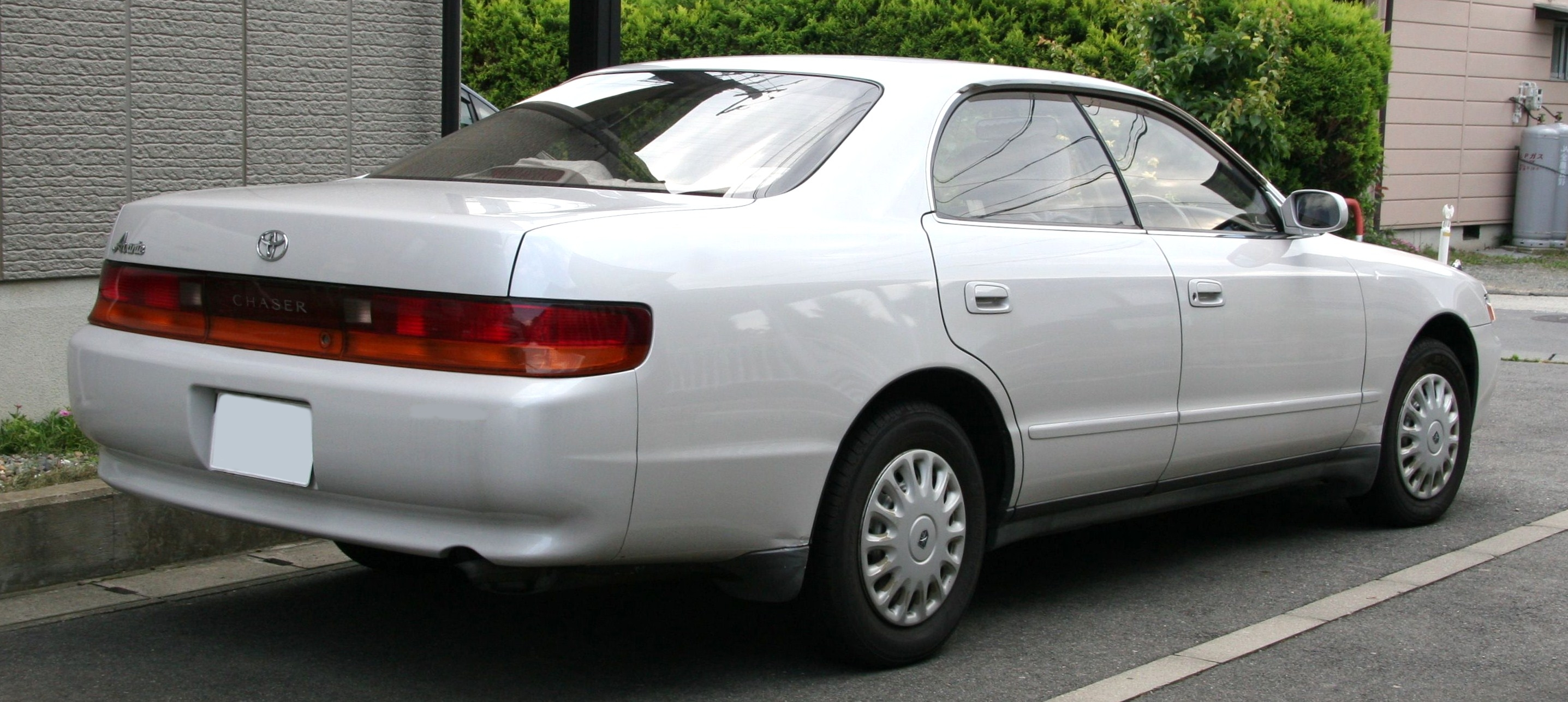
Pre-facelift Toyota Chaser 2.0 Avante (GX90)

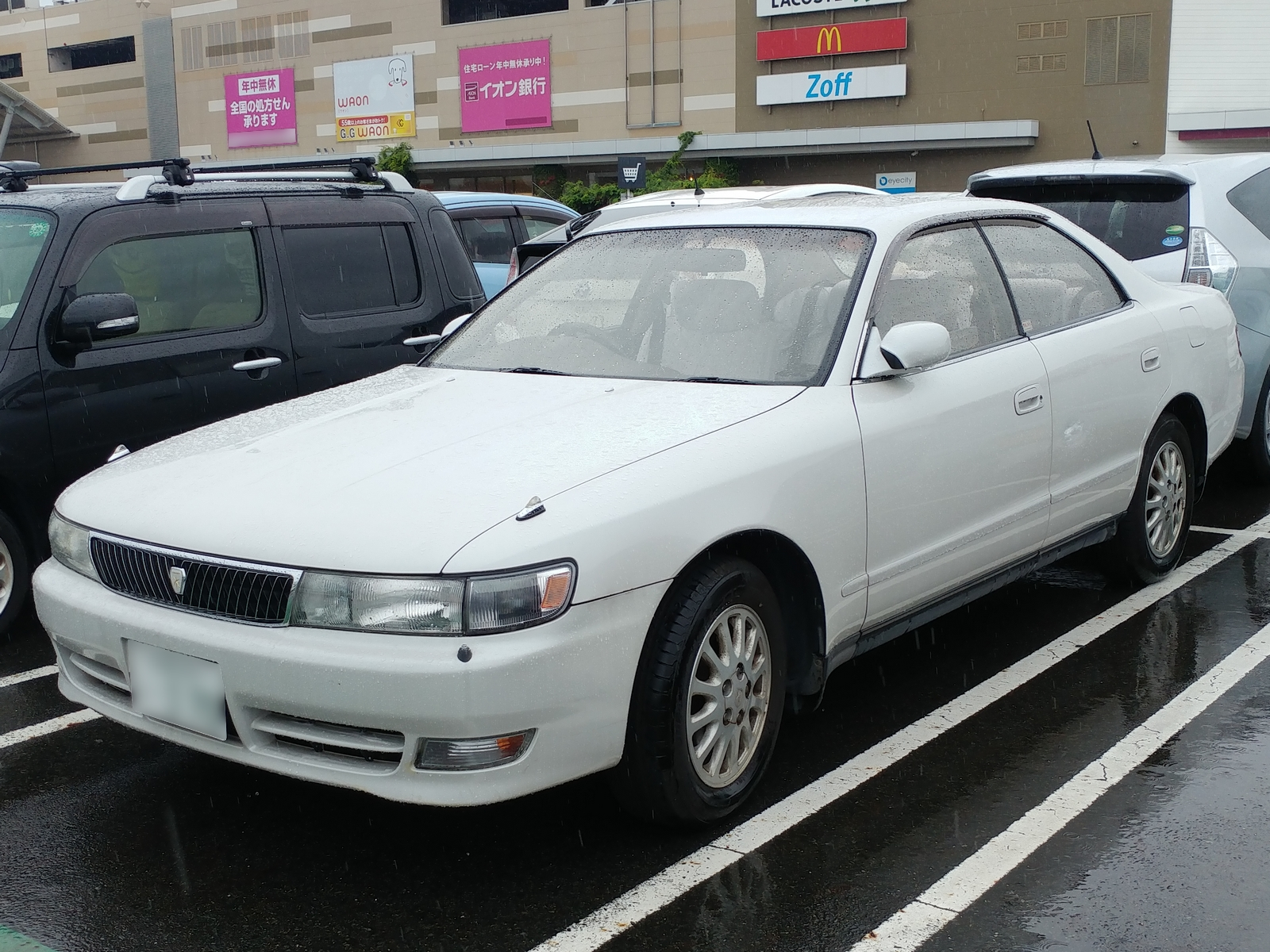
Facelift Toyota Chaser 2.5 Avante G (JZX90)

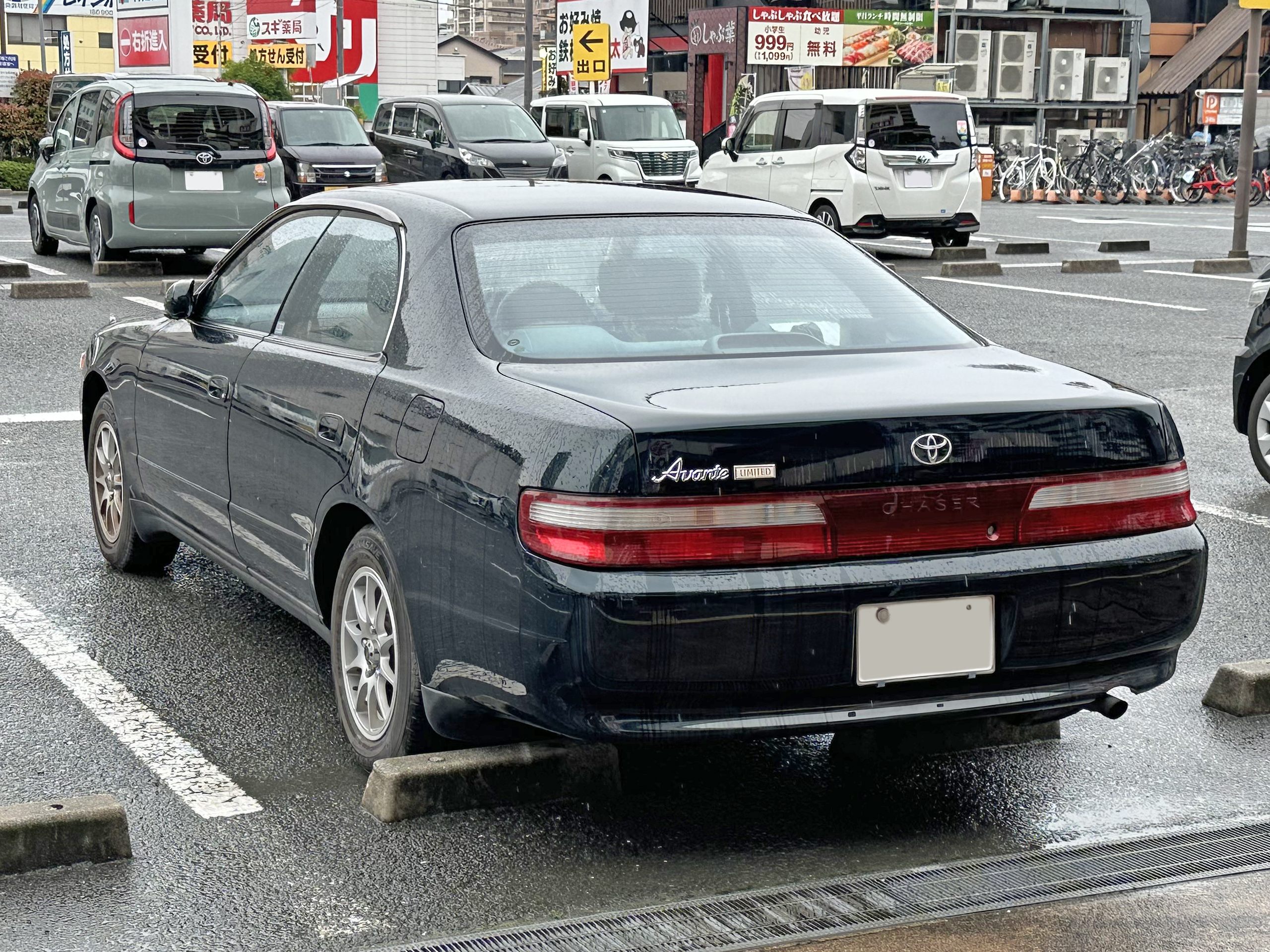
Facelift Toyota Chaser 2.0 Avante Limited (GX90)

== Sixth generation (X100; 1996–2001) ==
Toyota Chaser
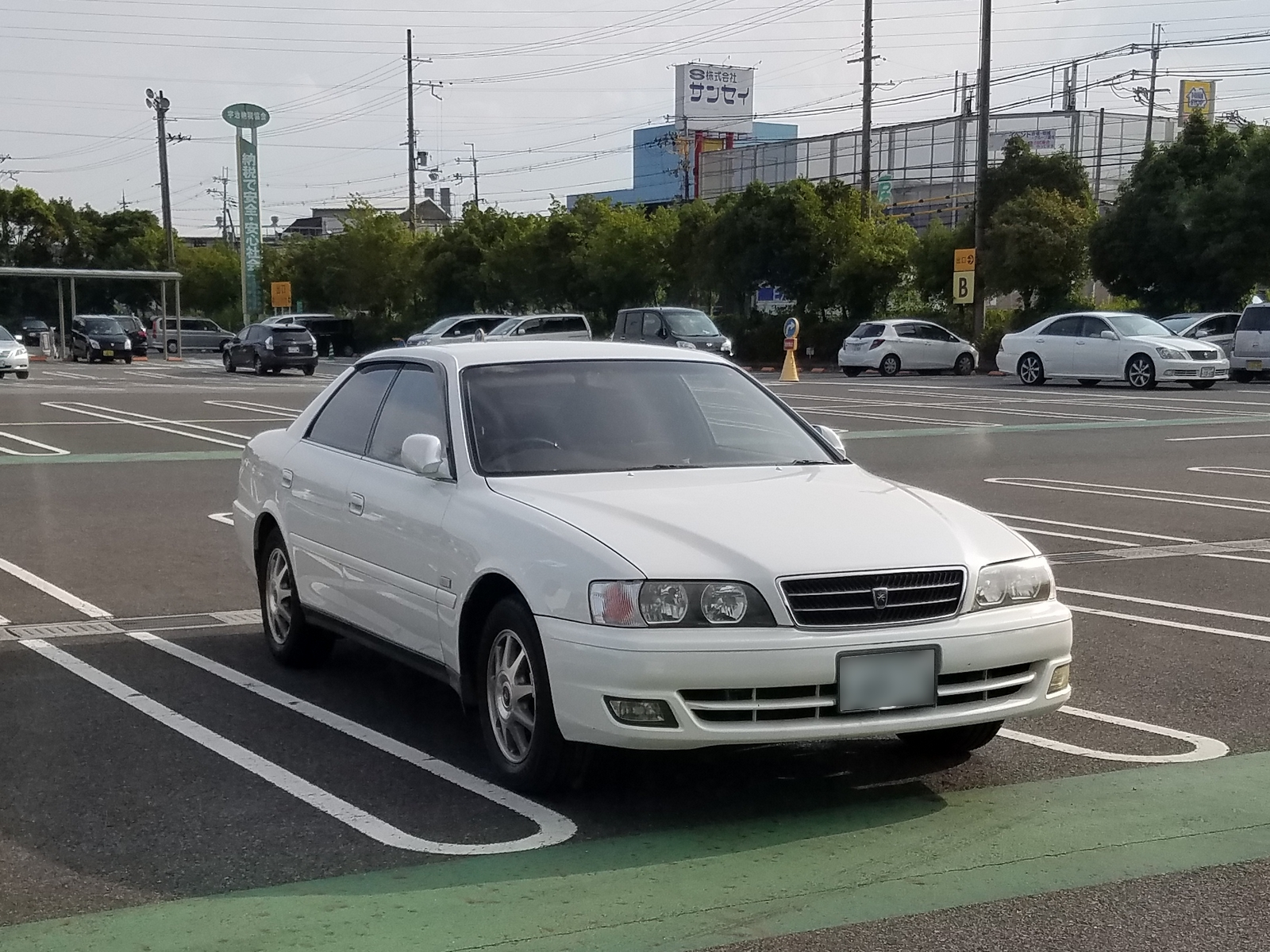
- Facelift Toyota Chaser 2.0 Avante (GX100, Japan)

Overview
- Model code: X100
- Production: 1996–2001
- Assembly: Miyawaka, Fukuoka (Miyata); (Toyota Motor Kyushu)
- Designer: Yukihiko Yaguchi

Body and chassis
- Body style: 4-door pillared hardtop sedan
- Layout: Front engine, rear-wheel drive; Front engine, all-wheel drive
- Related: Toyota Mark II (X100); Toyota Cresta (X100)

Powertrain
- Engine: 1.8 L 4S-FE I4; 2.0 L 1G-FE I6; 2.5 L 1JZ-GE I6; 2.5 L 1JZ-GTE turbo I6; 3.0 L 2JZ-GE I6; diesel: 2.4 L 2L-TE turbo-diesel I4
- Transmission: 5-speed R154 manual; 5-speed W55 manual; 5-speed W57 manual; 4-speed A340E automatic

Dimensions
- Wheelbase: 2,730 mm (107 in)
- Length: 4,760 mm (187 in)
- Width: 1,760 mm (69.1 in)
- Height: 1,400 mm (55.1 in)
- Curb weight: 1,450 kg (3,197 lb)

In September 1996, the X100 Chaser replaced the X90 Chaser. The product lineup consisted mostly of Avante and Tourer trim, with the Avante as the luxury model (with more interior accessories) and the Tourer as the sporty model (with large 16-inch wheels). Toyota's VVTi, the company's version of variable-valve timing, was added to the 1JZ engines; they were also upgraded to have more torque, since they had already reached the agreed voluntary limit set by Japanese Automobile Manufacturer's Association regarding horsepower. The 1JZ-GTE was powered by a single turbo configuration instead of the twin turbo of its predecessors.

New to the lineup was the Avante Four and the Avante Four G Package, which was the Avante 2.5 L installed with i-Four all-wheel-drive. These cars were only available with a 4-speed electronically controlled automatic transmission. The Tourer V and the automatic-only Avante G 3.0 L (2JZ) models had the option of electronic control flex lockup attaching 4-speed automatic (intelligent) (ECT-iE) transmission, besides the ECT-E automatic in the lower-end models. The Tourer V and Tourer S came standard with the next generation of digital instrumentation called Optitron while the Avante continued to use the previous version. Dual airbags and side airbags in the outer edge of the front seatbacks were now standard equipment.

In 1997, the lineup was updated. The XL was powered by the 2.4 L 2L-TE turbodiesel engine, while the 1G-FE engine powered the Tourer 2.0 L, rated at 140 PS (103 kW; 138 hp) at 5,600 rpm. These models were only sold with the 4-speed electronic control type (ECT) automatic transmission. The GPS-enabled navigation system continued with improvements and additional functionality.

In mid-late 1998, the base Tourer model received the optional manual gearbox. An AWD option was added to the 2.5L Avante models; the Four G Package received a higher special-edition interior. Additionally, the Chaser received a facelift, with the most significant changes to the rear tail lights. Other changes included new fog lights with a slightly redesigned front bar to accommodate them, different interior fabric, a 3-spoke steering wheel instead of 4 spokes, orange gauge lighting instead of white, and a grille with 2 horizontal bars instead of 3. The Chaser continued to be offered as the second-level sedan below the Toyota Aristo, and in 1998 Toyota Vista Store and Toyota Auto Store locations were combined and renamed NETZ Store.

The Chaser was discontinued in June 2001. It was replaced with a new model called the Verossa which shared the same model code. The Cresta suffered the same fate, but the Mark II continued for another generation (X110) before it was also discontinued. In 2004, the all-new X120 Mark X was introduced in Japan, incorporating many characteristics of the Chaser and the Cresta.

- Trim packages (3.0L, 2.5L, 2.0L and 1.8L)
  - 3.0 Avante G, 2.5 Avante G, 2.5 Tourer V, 2.5 Tourer S, 2.5 Avante, 2.5 Avante Four, 2.0 Avante, 2.0 Tourer
- Diesel Sedan trim packages
  - Avante, XL (turbodiesel)

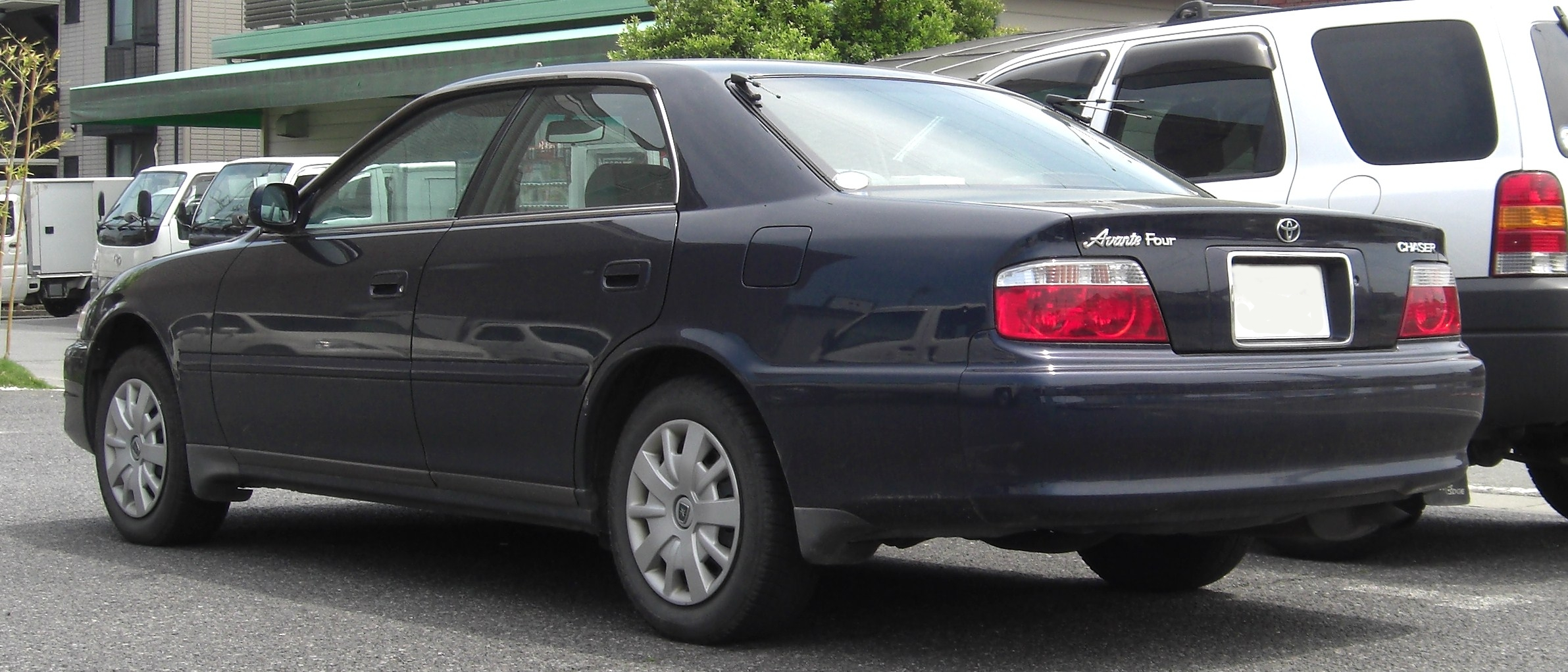
1998 Toyota Chaser Avante Four (JZX105, Japan)

=== Motorsports ===
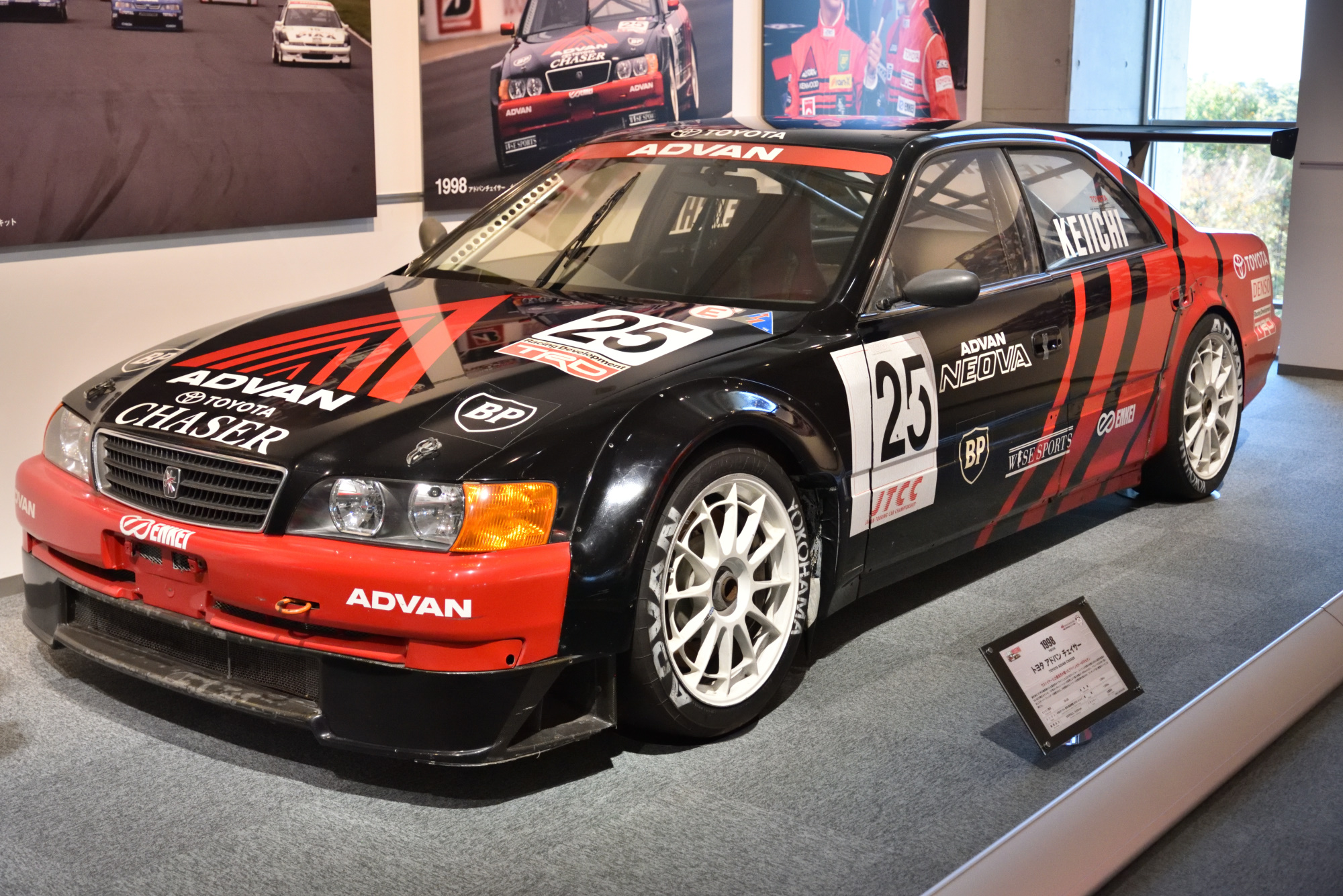
The Chaser competed in the JTCC during the 1990s

X100 Chasers took part in the Japanese Touring Car Championship in 1997 and 1998. The car did not manage to win a race in its debut season, while the following year, when other manufacturers had left the JTCC, it won the title with Masanori Sekiya and TOM'S. The Chaser became famous in drifting events, due to its traditional front-engine, rear-wheel-drive layout, and vehicles without AWD installed are more sought after. Numerous Toyota Chasers, especially the later X90s and X100s, have been modified for use in drifting.

== See also ==
- List of Toyota vehicles
