= 2022 D1 Grand Prix series =

Japanese Grand Prix series

2022 Gran Turismo D1 Grand Prix series was the 22nd season of D1 Grand Prix and it started from April 24 on Fuji Speedway and ended on November 6 on Ebisu Circuit.

Naoki Nakamura entered the season as the Defending Champion.

Masashi Yokoi won his third championship with Masato Kawabata winning the Tanso (Solo Run) championship.

== Regulation Changes ==
In an attempt to reduce grip from specialised tires, D1GP now mandates the UN/ECE R117-02 international standard for wet performance, noise and rolling resistance. The grip reduction is implemented in order to decrease damaged cause by tires to the road surfaces and also to increase tire choices. The tires that will be used will undergo an inspection before being able to be use in competition. This rule change caused Linglong and Sailun to withdraw from the series because of an inability to provide tires with such specification.

Following dispute over a pit time limit in Autopolis, the time given to service a vehicle between rounds is limited to three minutes. An official will be observing the clock as the cars are being serviced.

== Schedule ==
Round	Venue	Date	Winner		Report
Round	Venue	Date	Single-Run	Follow-up	Report
1	Fuji Speedway, Shizuoka Prefecture	April 23	Hideyuki Fujino	Masato Kawabata	
1	Fuji Speedway, Shizuoka Prefecture	April 24	Hideyuki Fujino	Masato Kawabata	
2	Okuibuki Motorpark, Shiga Prefecture	June 11	Kojiro Mekuwa	Naoki Nakamura	
3	Okuibuki Motorpark, Shiga Prefecture	June 12	Naoki Nakamura	Naoki Nakamura	
4	Ebisu Circuit (West Course), Fukushima Prefecture	August 20	Masashi Yokoi	Kojiro Mekuwa	
5	Ebisu Circuit (West Course), Fukushima Prefecture	August 21	Hokuto Matsuyama	Hokuto Matsuyama	
6	Autopolis, Ōita Prefecture	October 22	Koudai Sobagiri	Masashi Yokoi	
7	Autopolis, Ōita Prefecture	October 23	Koudai Sobagiri	Masato Kawabata	
8	Ebisu Circuit (Bank Course), Fukushima Prefecture	November 12	Daigo Saito	Masao Suenaga	
9	Ebisu Circuit (Bank Course), Fukushima Prefecture	November 13	Koudai Sobagiri	Masao Suenaga	

=== Changes ===
- Fuji Speedway return to the calendar after last held D1GP event in 2016.The competition will be held alongside Motor Fan Festa with the Qualifying and Top 16 held on Saturday and Top 8 onwards held the following day.
- The Ebisu event will now be held on the West Course, which previously used in 2020. The former South Course has been converted to rally style gravel and not suitable for drifting.
- Ebisu Circuit will also host the last two rounds of the season with a newly finished banked corner on its West Course, making it the third different layout in the Ebisu Circuit complex.
- Okuibuki Motorpark will only hold two rounds as opposed to the four of the previous season.

== Drivers and Teams ==
Entry list as of round 8 and 9

Team	No.	Driver	Machine	Tires	Round
TMAR x TEAM 紫	99	(Japan) Naoki Nakamura	Nissan Silvia (S15)	Valino	1
TMAR x TEAM 紫	99	(Japan) Naoki Nakamura	Nissan Silvia (S13)	Valino	2-9
TEAM 紫 TOPTUL x VALINO TIRES	98	(Japan) Hiroki Vito	Nissan Silvia (S13)	Valino	All
DMAX RACING TEAM	70	(Japan) Masashi Yokoi	Nissan Silvia (S15)	Nankang	All
DMAX RACING TEAM	46	(Japan) Masao Suenaga	Nissan Silvia (S15)	Nankang	All
Team ORANGE	57	Kanta Yanaguida	Nissan Silvia (S15)	Yokohama	4-5
TMAR	87	Daigo Saito	Toyota GR Supra	Yokohama	2-9
TMAR	77	Hokuto Matsuyama	Toyota GR Supra	Toyo Tires	2-9
Freem TEAM G-meister	16	Koji Yamaguchi	Nissan Silvia (S15)	Valino	All
Freem TEAM G-meister	79	Kojiro Mekuwa	Nissan 180SX (RPS13)	Valino	All
TEAM RE雨宮 K & N	7	Yukio Matsui	Mazda RX-7 (FD3S)	Toyo Tires	All
TEAM TOYO TIRES DRIFT	66	Hideyuki Fujino	Toyota GR86	Toyo Tires	All
TEAM TOYO TIRES DRIFT	88	Masato Kawabata	Toyota GR86	Toyo Tires	All
VITOUR RACING SEIMI STYLE DRIFT	2	Seimi Tanaka	Nissan Silvia (S15)	Vitour	All
TMAR x TEAM VERTEX	78	Takahiro Ueno	Lexus RC	Yokohama	All
TEAM MORI	52	Yusuke Kitaoka	Toyota Mark II (JZX100)	Vitour	All
Yokohama TOYOPET X 俺だっ!レーシング	90	(Japan) Tsuyoshi Tezuka	Toyota GR Supra	Yokohama	8-9
SHIBATA RACING TEAM SHIBATIRE	31	Koudai Sobagiri	Infiniti Q60	Shibatire	All
SHIBATA RACING TEAM SHIBATIRE	84	Masakazu Hasi	Nissan Silvia (S15)	Shibatire	All
VALINO	15	Katsuhiro Ueo	Nissan 180SX (RPS13)	Valino	All
Team CM Feeling.	23	Mitsuru Murakami	Nissan Silvia (S15)	Toyo Tires	1-5
Team CM Feeling.	23	Mitsuru Murakami	Nissan Silvia (S15)	Shibatire	6-7
RS WATANABE SPEED MASTER BUY NOW JAPAN	43	Yoshifumi Tadokoro	Toyota AE86	Habilead	All
RS WATANABE SPEED MASTER BUY NOW JAPAN	51	Teruyoshi Iwai	Mazda RX-7 (FC3S)	Federal	All
OKUTONE FP IWANACENTER	27	Takeshi Mogi	Nissan Silvia (S15)	Shibatire	All
VITOUR Racing GP SPORTS	56	Takahiro Mori	Nissan 180SX (RPS13)	Vitour	All
DSL.com	33	Shigehisa Sasayama	Toyota Chaser (JZX100)	Valino	8-9
SPAN Racing	9	Wataru Yamamoto	Toyota GR Supra	Shibatire	4-5
TEAM TNR	30	Tetsuro Nakata	Toyota Mark II (JZX100)	Tri-Ace	1,8-9
Mercury 車楽人 VALINO	38	Sayaka Shimoda	Nissan Silvia (S15)	Valino	1-3,6-7
OS GIKEN SUNOCO	48	Tomoyuki Kitashiba	Toyota GT86 (ZN6)	Shibatire	1
Team miyaseimitsu	55	Hisashi Saito	Nissan Silvia (S15)	Vitour	1
Team BOOSTAR VALINO	69	Ryusei Akiba	Nissan Silvia (S15)	Valino	All
HIRANO TIRE Auto Garage KATAOKA	93	Kazuyuki Masuda	Nissan Silvia (S15)	Goodride	1-5
CAR GUY Racing	97	Shinichiro Saito	Toyota GR Supra	Goodride	1-3,8--9
BC Racing	91	Tai Xiao-Hsang	Nissan Silvia (S15)	Toyo Tires	2-3

=== Changes ===
- Linglong Tire and Sailun Tires withdraw as tyre supplier for this season as they could not comply with the 2022 tyre regulation. As of results Team Orange who have Linglong as title sponsor compete full time in Formula Drift Japan instead, but later Kanta Yanaguida who acquired D1GP license by winning twice in D1 Lights the previous year will compete for the team with Yokohama tires, Akinori Utsumi would not compete in D1GP for the first time since 2001, Kazumi Takahashi will only compete in Formula Drift Japan following Sailun withdrawal while Seimi Tanaka and Yusuke Kitaoka changes tyre maker to Vitour.
- Shibata Racing changes tyre maker to their own in-house built tire Shibatire working together with Rydanz with Masakazu Hashi joining the team as second driver.
- Yokohama return as tyre supplier for Daigo Saito and Takahiro Ueno after last supplying tires in 2016 season.
  - Despite using Yokohama during Exhibition event in 2022 Tokyo Auto Salon Masashi Yokoi and DMAX remain using Nankang but no longer became team's title sponsor
- Sayaka Shimoda joined the competition and became the first female driver to compete in D1GP since Michie Mimoto in 2015
- Hiroki Vito graduate to D1GP after winning D1 Lights the previous year
- Teruyoshi Iwai changes tyre supplier from Vitour to Federal.
- Tetsura Nakata return to D1GP after missing the whole 2021 season.
- Fat Five Racing became Trail Motor Apex Racing and at same time collaborating with Team Vertex and Naoki Nakamura but due to schedule clash with Formula Drift Japan they missed the first round.
- Naoki Nakamura's S13 V8 Silvia had an engine issue during the opening round, and used his previous car, an S15 Silvia for that roundround.
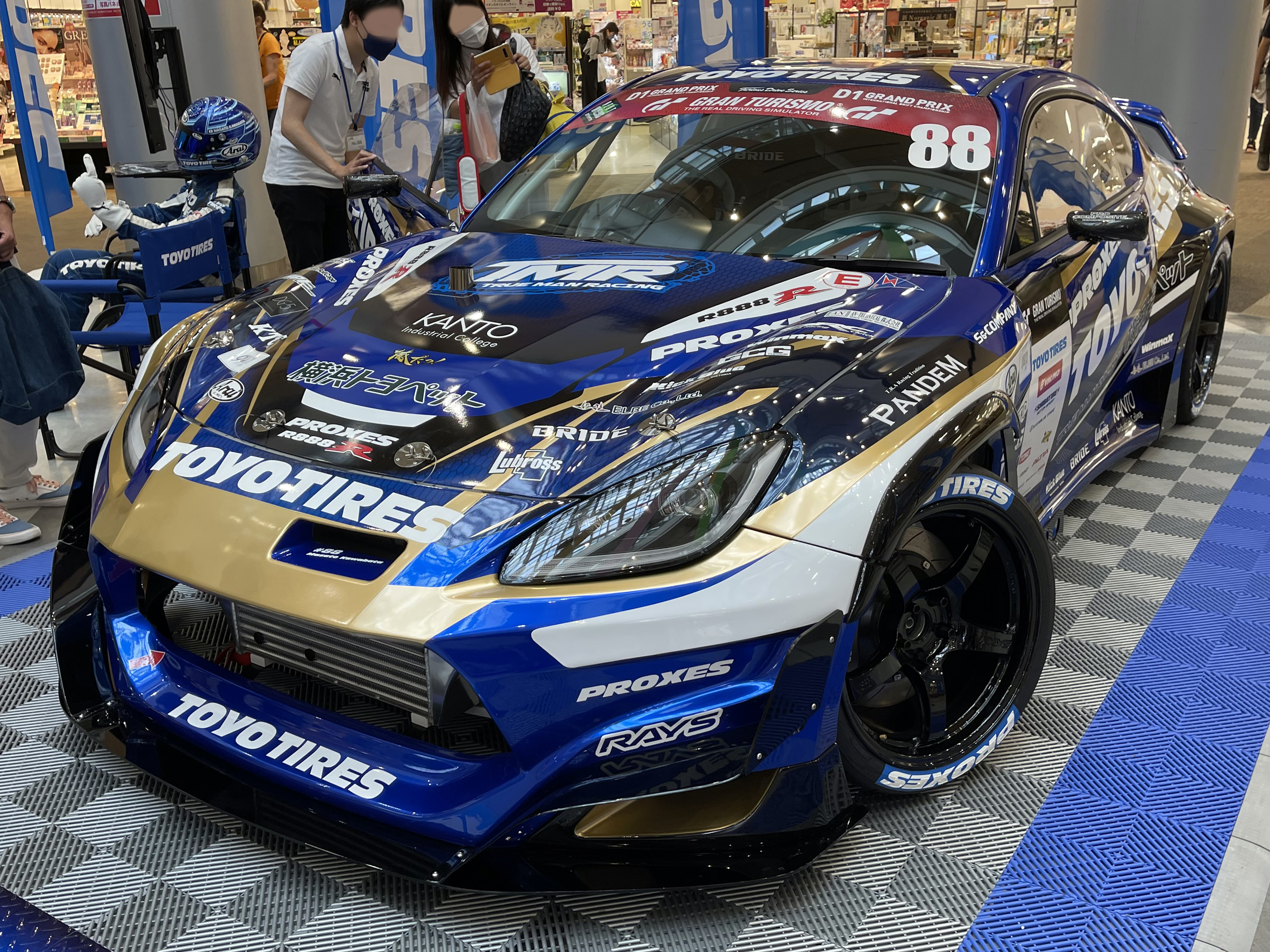
  Masato Kawabata newly build GR86
  Team Toyo Tires will debut the new Toyota GR86 build by Wisteria and will be driven by Masato Kawabata and Hideyuki Fujino.
- Katsuhiro Ueo replace S15 Silvia to 180SX which he use in Formula Drift Japan the previous year.
- Tai Xiao-Hsang became the first non-Japanese driver to compete in series since Charles Ng and Daychapon Toyingcharoen in 2019
- Yokohama TOYOPET X 俺だっ!レーシング will only compete in final two round of the season with Tsuyoshi Tezuka returning since last competing in 2017 and will use Yokohama tyres.
- Mitsuru Murakami misses the final two round of the season to focus on next year of the competition.

== Ranking ==
=== Overall Drivers' Ranking ===
Rank.	Driver	Fuji	Okuibuki		Ebisu		Autopolis		Ebisu		Total.
Rank.	Driver	RD.1	RD.2	RD.3	RD.4	RD.5	RD.6	RD.7	RD.8	RD.9	Total.
1	Masashi Yokoi	21	15	21	22	11	28	0	16	16*	150
2	Masato Kawabata	26	10	15	9	19	7	28	10	15	139
3	Naoki Nakamura	0	25	29	24	0†	11	16	16	16*	137
4	Masao Suenaga	16	19	16	11	0	0	10	25	18*	115
5	Yusuke Kitaoka	11	4	21	5	6	20	19	13	10	109
6	Hideyuki Fujino	22	5	1	12	12	10	8	21	6	107
7	Koudai Sobagiri	7	10	5	6	3	25	25	7	17	105
8	Hokuto Matsuyama	0	16	6	18	29	0	11	5	8	93
9	Kojiro Mekuwa	1	17	12	25	7	0	6	6	7	81
10	Daigo Saito	0	0	0	7	11	5	12	22	12	69
11	Hiroki Vito	12	7	0	0	0	13	4	4	16*	56
12	Katsuhiro Ueo	15	21	0	1	10	3	2	0	0	52
13	Seimi Tanaka	6	6	7	0	13	1	7	2	5	47
14	Ryusei Akiba	0	0	4	10	5	12	15	0	0	46
15	Yukio Matsui	0	11	2	0	2	17	5	0	0	37
16	Teruyoshi Iwai	11	0	0	13	4	2	0	0	2	32
17	Sayaka Shimoda	0	0	10	-	-	4	0	11	0	25
18	Kanta Yanaguida	-	-	-	4	16	-	-	-	-	20
19	Tsuyoshi Tezuka	-	-	-	-	-	-	-	10	3	13
20	Takahiro Mori	5	2	0	0	0	0	1	0	4	12
21	Takahiro Ueno	0	0	0	0	0	8	3	1	0	12
22	Mitsuru Murakami	0	3	3	0	0	6	0	-	-	12
13	Tetsuro Nakata	10	0	0	0	0	0	0	0	1	11
24	Kazuyuki Masuda	0	0	9	0	0	-	-	-	-	9
25	Takeshi Mogi	3	0	0	3	1	0	0	0	0	7
26	Shinichiro Saito	4	-	-	-	-	-	-	0	0	4
27	Kouji Yamaguchi	0	0	0	0	0	0	0	3	0	3
28	Wataru Yamamoto	-	-	0	2	0	-	-	-	-	2
29	Masakazu Hashi	0	1	1	0	0	0	0	0	0	2
30	Yoshifumi Tadokoro	2	0	0	0	0	0	0	0	0	2

Note :

† : Naoki Nakamura gets second place but according to the regulation due to his rear tire debeaded he did not awarded any point

* : Due to debris flying and injured one of the spectator the event were not continued and as per regulation the Top 4 were given the same point (excluding Tanso point) and the winner is given to the highest quailifier

=== Solo Run Ranking ===
Rank.	Driver	RD.1	RD.2	RD.3	RD.4	RD.5	RD.6	RD.7	RD.8	RD.9	Total
1	Masato Kawabata	14	12	15	14	14	11	16	15	16	127
2	Sobagiri Kodai	8	15	7	11	4	20	20	12	20	117
3	Masashi Yokoi	12	16	12	20	16	16	0	16	8	116
4	Yusuke Kitaoka	16	5	16	8	8	15	14	14	12	108
5	Hideyuki Fujino	20	6	8	7	11	5	13	13	10	93
6	Kojiro Mekuwa	1	20	11	13	13	0	7	10	11	86
7	Hokuto Matsuyama	-	7	10	15	20	0	8	7	13	80
8	Naoki Nakamura	0	8	20	16	0	7	12	11	5	79
9	Daigo Saito	-	0	0	12	10	6	11	20	14	73
10	Seimi Tanaka	7	10	13	0	12	1	10	2	6	61
11	Masao Suenaga	11	14	5	6	0	0	5	3	15	59
12	Hiroki Vito	13	11	0	0	0	12	4	5	7	52
13	Ryusei Akiba	0	0	6	4	7	10	15	0	0	42
14	Yukio Matsui	0	13	2	0	3	14	6	0	0	38
15	Teruyoshi Iwai	10	0	0	10	6	2	0	0	2	30
16	Katsuhiro Ueo	15	3	0	1	5	3	2	0	0	29
17	Takahiro Ueno	0	0	0	0	0	13	3	1	0	17
18	Sayaka Shimoda	0	0	4	-	-	4	0	8	0	16
19	Mitsuru Murakami	0	4	3	0	0	8	0	-	-	15
20	Kazuyuki Masuda	0	0	14	-	-	-	-	-	-	14
21	Takahiro Mori	6	2	0	0	0	0	1	0	4	13
22	Tsuyoshi Tezuka	-	-	-	-	-	-	-	6	3	9
23	Takeshi Mogi	4	0	0	3	1	0	0	0	0	8
24	Yanagikuida Kanta	-	-	-	5	2	-	-	-	-	7
25	Shinichiro Saito	5	-	-	-	-	-	-	0	0	5
26	Koji Yamaguchi	0	0	0	0	0	0	0	4	0	4
27	Tetsuro Nakata	2	-	-	-	-	-	-	0	1	3
28	Yoshifumi Tadokoro	3	0	0	0	0	0	0	0	0	3
29	Wataru Yamamoto	-	-	-	2	0	-	-	-	-	2
10	Masakazu Hashi	0	1	1	0	0	0	0	0	0	2

=== Teams' Ranking ===
Rank.	team	RD.1	RD.2	RD.3	RD.4	RD.5	RD.6	RD.7	RD.8	RD.9	Total
1	D-MAX RACING TEAM	20	15	20	15	3	26	6	26	Ten	141
2	TEAM TOYO TIRES DRIFT	26	6	6	6	15	6	26	20	6	117
3	TMAR × TEAM紫	0	26	26	20	0	6	10	10	10	108
4	TMAR	-	10	3	10	26	3	6	15	6	79
5	TEAM MORI	3	3	15	3	3	15	15	6	6	69
6	SHIBATA RACING TEAM SHIBATIRE	3	3	3	3	3	20	20	3	6	64
7	Freem TEAM G-meister	3	6	6	26	3	0	3	3	3	53
8	VALINO	6	20	0	3	6	3	3	0	0	41
9	TEAM 紫 TOPTUL × VALINO TIRE	6	3	0	-	-	6	3	3	10	31
Ten	VITOUR RACING SEIMI STYLE DRIFT	3	3	3	0	6	3	3	3	3	27
11	TEAM RE 雨宮 K&N	0	6	3	0	3	10	3	0	0	25
12	Team BOOSTAR VALINO	0	0	3	6	3	6	6	0	0	24
13	RS WATANABE SPEED MASTER BUY NOW JAPAN	6	0	0	6	3	3	0	0	3	21
14	Mercury 車楽人 Valino	0	0	6	-	-	3	0	6	0	15
15	Team ORANGE	-	-	-	3	10	-	-	-	-	13
16	VITOUR Racing GP SPORTS	3	3	0	0	0	0	3	0	3	12
17	Yokohama Toyopet x 俺だっ！レーシング	-	-	-	-	-	-	-	6	3	9
18	TEAM TNR	6	-	-	-	-	-	-	-	3	9
19	TMAR × TEAM VERTEX	0	0	0	0	0	3	3	3	0	9
20	Team CM Feeling.	0	3	3	-	-	3	0	0	0	9
21	OKUTONE FP IWANA CENTER	3	0	0	3	3	0	0	0	0	9
22	SPAN Racing	-	-	-	3	0	-	-	-	-	3
23	HIRANO TIRE Auto Garage KATAOKA	0	0	3	0	-	-	-	-	-	3
24	CAR GUY Racing	3	-	-	-	-	-	-	0	0	3

=== Points System ===
Overall Standings
Positions	1st	2nd	3rd	4th	5th	6th	7th	8th	9th	10th	11th	12th	13th	14th	15th	16th
Drivers Point	25	21	18	16	13	12	11	10	8	7	6	5	4	3	2	1
Team Point	26	20	15	10	6	6	6	6	3	3	3	3	3	3	3	3
Tanso Points	4	3	2	1												
Tanso Standings
Point	20	16	15	14	13	12	11	10	8	7	6	5	4	3	2	1

Note :

† : Naoki Nakamura gets second place but according to the regulation due to his rear tire debeaded he did not awarded any point

* : Due to debris flying and injured one of the spectator the event were not continued and as per regulation the Top 4 were given the same point (excluding Tanso point) and the winner is given to the highest quailifier
