= 2014 D1 Grand Prix series =

Motor racing competition

Seasons
- ← 2013 2015 →

The 2014 D1 Grand Prix series was the fourteenth season for the D1 Grand Prix series and the ninth for the D1 Street Legal spinoff series. The season began on March 29 at Fuji Speedway for the D1GP and April 12 for D1SL at Bihoku Highland Circuit. The series was concluded on October 19 with the D1 Champions' event at Odaiba Tokyo Street Course.

== Regulation changes ==
Starting in the 2014 season, nitrous use has been banned and there have been requirements for cars to have catalytic converters and for exhaust pipes to be pointed towards the ground.

== Schedule ==
Round		Venue	Location	Date	Winner	Car
D1GP	D1SL	Venue	Location	Date	Winner	Car
1		(Shizuoka Prefecture) Fuji Speedway	Shizuoka Prefecture	March 29–30	Kazuya Matsukawa^{1}	Toyota AE85
	1	(Hiroshima Prefecture) Bihoku Highland Circuit	Hiroshima Prefecture	April 12–13	Naoki Nakamura	Nissan PS13
	2	(Niigata Prefecture) Maze Sea Circuit	Niigata Prefecture	May 10–11	Ono Toruno	Nissan C33
2		(Mie Prefecture) Suzuka Circuit	Mie Prefecture	May 24–25	Kenji Takayama	Lexus GRS191
	3	(Ehime Prefecture) Seto Inland Sea Circuit	Ehime Prefecture	June 7–8	Naoki Nakamura	Nissan PS13
	4	(Fukushima Prefecture) Ebisu Circuit	Fukushima Prefecture	July 12–13	Junji Yamamoto	Mazda FD3S
3		(Ōita Prefecture) Autopolis	Ōita Prefecture	July 26–27	Kuniaki Takahashi	Toyota GRX130
4		(Fukushima Prefecture) Ebisu Circuit	Fukushima Prefecture	August 23	Yukio Matsui	Mazda FD3S
5		(Fukushima Prefecture) Ebisu Circuit	Fukushima Prefecture	August 24	Masashi Yokoi	Nissan S15
	5	(Nara Prefecture) Meihan Sportsland	Nara Prefecture	September 6–7	Naoki Nakamura	Nissan PS13
	6	(Tochigi Prefecture) Nikkō Circuit	Tochigi Prefecture	October 4–5	Naoki Nakamura	Nissan PS13
6		(Tokyo) Odaiba	Tokyo Prefecture	October 17–18	Masao Suenaga	Mazda FD3S
D1 Champions'		(Tokyo) Odaiba	Tokyo Prefecture	October 19	Kuniaki Takahashi	Toyota GRX130

1. Event was cancelled due to weather

== Drivers' rankings ==
=== D1GP ===
Position	Driver	Car	Rd.1	Rd.2	Rd.3	Rd.4	Rd.5	Rd.6	Total
1st	(Japan) Kuniaki Takahashi	Toyota GRX130	13.5	27	35	21	30	12	138.5
2nd	(Japan) Masao Suenaga	Maxda FD3S	8.5	30	8	27	20	35	128.5
3rd	(Japan) Masashi Yokoi	Nissan S15	10	14	30	3	35	15	107
4th	(Japan) Tetsuya Hibino	Toyota ZN6	2	21	14	30	19	20	106
5th	(Japan) Yukio Matsui	Mazda FD3S	0	10	27	35	4	21	97
6th	(Japan) Masato Kawabata	Nissan R35	1.5	11	22	15	10	30	89.5
7th	(Japan) Youichi Imamura	Toyota ZN6	7	0	25	17	25	13	87
8th	(Japan) Kenji Takayama	Lexus GRS191	4	25	10	4	8	25	86
9th	(Japan) Naoto Suenaga	Nissan S15	11	20	12	10	11	14	78
10th	(Japan) Kazuya Bai	Nissan RPS13	10.5	13	21	2	12	17	75.5
11th	(Japan) Tomohiro Murayama	Nissan S14	0	25	19	12	15	1	72
12th	(Japan) Tsuyoshi Tezuka	Toyota JZX100	12.5	6	15	20	7	10	70.5
13th	(Japan) Manabu Orido	Toyota ZN6	6	22	2	25	14	0	69
14th	(Japan) Seimi Tanaka	Nissan S15	8	0	3	0	27	27	65
15th	(Japan) Daigo Saito	Lexus GSE20	7.5	12	0	0	21	22	62.5
16th	(Japan) Tatsuya Sakuma	Nissan S15	2.5	19	17	6	0	16	60.5
17th	(Japan) Akinori Utsumi	Nissan S15	9.5	15	16	8	2	2	52.5
17th	(Japan) Kazuya Matsukawa	Toyota AE85	17.5	3	0	13	0	19	52.5
19th	(Japan) Tatsuya Kataoka	Toyota JZA80	15	4	0	7	16	8	50
20th	(Japan) Takahiro Ueno	BMW E92	5	16	7	0	0	7	35
21st	(Japan) Minowa Shinji	Nissan S15	0	0	4	0	22	5	31
22nd	(Japan) Kunihiko Teramachi	Nissan S15	0	0	5	5	17	0	27
23rd	(Japan) Nobushige Kumakubo	Nissan S15	0	0	0	19	6	0	25
23rd	(Japan) Yoshifumi Tadokoro	Toyota AE86	1	0	0	0	13	11	25
25th	(Indonesia) Emmanuel Amandio	Toyota JZX100	5.5	0	13	0	0	6	24.5
26th	(Japan) Masayoshi Tokita	Toyota GRS184	0	8	0	16	0	0	24
27th	(Japan) Nobuteru Taniguchi	Toyota ZN6	0	0	0	22	0	0	22
28th	(Japan) Tsutomu Fujio	Nissan ER34	0	0	20	0	0	0	20
28th	(Japan) Teruyoshi Iwai	Daihatsu A35	0	17	0	0	0	3	20
30th	(Japan) Yuji Tanaka	Toyota JZA80	6.5	7	0	0	0	4	17.5
31st	(Japan) Akira Hirashima	Nissan S15	0	0	11	0	5	0	16
32nd	(Japan) Saito Ikuo	Toyota JZX100	0	0	0	14	0	0	14
33rd	(Japan) Shinji Sagisaka	Toyota SXE10	0	1	0	11	0	0	12
34th	(Japan) Manabu Fujinaka	Maxda FD3S	0	0	6	0	0	0	6
35th	(United States) Robbie Nishida	Nissan ECR33	0	5	0	0	0	0	5
36th	(Australia) Andy Gray	Toyota JZX100	3	0	0	0	1	0	4
36th	(Taiwan) Feng Chih-Jen	Nissan S15	0	0	0	1	3	0	4
38th	(Japan) Atsushi Taniguchi	Toyota JZX100	3.5	0	0	0	0	0	3.5
39th	(Japan) Tomohiro Ooshima	Toyota GZ20	0	2	0	0	0	0	2
40th	(Japan) Ajimoto Michie	Nissan S14	0	0	1	0	0	0	1
41st	(Japan) Takamasa Kuroi	Toyota JZX100	0.5	0	0	0	0	0	0.5
