= D1 Grand Prix =

Production car drifting series from Japan

- Category: Drifting
- Country: Japan
- Inaugural season: 2001
- Drivers' champion: Koudai Sobagiri (2026)
- Teams' champion: Mind Control Racing Shibatire
- Official website: D1GP.co.jp (in Japanese)

The D1 Grand Prix (Japanese: D1グランプリ, Hepburn: D1 guranpuri), abbreviated as D1GP and subtitled Professional Drift, is a production car drifting series from Japan. After several years of hosting amateur drifting contests, Daijiro Inada, founder of Option magazine and Tokyo Auto Salon, and drifting legend, Keiichi Tsuchiya hosted a professional level drifting contest in 1999 and 2000 to feed on the ever increasing skills of drifting drivers who were dominating drifting contests in various parts of Japan. In October 2000, they reformed the contest as a five-round series. In the following year for the following round, the introduction of the two car tsuiou battle, run in a single-elimination tournament format, a common tradition for tōge races which became popular with car enthusiasts.

The series has become a benchmark for all drifting series as its tsuisou format became widely adopted in drifting events throughout the world and is the most highly regarded of all series.

== History ==
D1 Grand Prix Sponsor Box for the 2006 season

The art of drifting can be traced to the early days of motorsport when pre-war Grand Prix and dirt track racing drivers such as Tazio Nuvolari used an at-the-limit form of driving called the four-wheel drift.

The bias ply racing tires of the 1960s-1980s lent themselves to driving styles with a high slip angle. As professional racers in Japan drove this way, so did the street racers.

As street tōge racing became increasingly common, one of the first drifting contests was hosted by the Japanese Carboy magazine in 1986 and then in 1989, the year after the first introduction of the Video Option series Daijiro Inada (稲田大二郎) decided on introducing a rival drifting event which was judged by Keiichi Tsuchiya known as the Ikaten. Through the years, the standards of drifting drivers has risen rapidly and drivers began to dominate the series. As a result, Inada decided on a new series to accommodate the more experienced and skilled drivers. In 2000, a new series called All Japan Professional Drift Championship (全日本プロドリフト選手権, Zen Nihon Puro Dorifuto Sensyuken) consisting of Keiichi Tsuchiya (土屋圭市) and Manabu Orido (織戸 学) as judges, and Manabu Suzuki (鈴木 学) as commentator. Other personnel consisted of Kitahara, as the tech inspector, and Takayasu Ozaku (more commonly known as Zaku the perverted cameraman) as the series' long serving cameraman. Racing driver Tarzan Yamada made appearances in earlier rounds and Inada himself would usually make guest appearances in the opening ceremony and judging stand.

The first ever event was at Ebisu Circuit in Fukushima, Japan, in October 2000 with an entry of forty and a crowd of three thousand. Drivers were judged individually and were treated as the first round of the 2001 season, shortly renamed as D1 Grand Prix. From round two onward, the series took a different turn. Unlike drift events which judged the cars individually each round then eliminating the rest, the series introduced the one-to-one round battle called the tsuiso (twin run) round which has been the tradition for Tōge races and has since been adopted for drifting events all over the world. Aftermarket parts manufacturers BLITZ, HKS and A'PEXi soon began to get involved by sponsoring drivers entering the competition.

In 2002, the number of cars competing in the tsuiou rounds was reduced from ten to eight, and was reduced to six by round two, as the second tansou rounds increased to twelve. That was increased to sixteen by round four which stands to this day.

The series remained domestic until 2003 when an exhibition round was hosted in Southern California at Irwindale Speedway, produced by American marketing company, Slipstream Global. That same year, Grassroots Motorsports also presented the D1 Grand Prix with the Editors' Choice Award. Slipstream Global would later create the Formula Drift Championship in 2004. With a sellout crowd of ten thousand, which broke the record for the venue and the series, this venue became the series' opening round in 2004. The California round saw the introduction of the English speaking commentator Toshi Hayama, who also dealt with the organisation of the non-Japanese events.

That year also saw the car accessories store Autobacs as the title sponsor, and brought the first non-circuit event at Odaiba in Japan in January 2004, held in a Fuji Television car park. It also later ran as a championship round. In December 2004, the D1GP was held in the infield road circuit of the California Speedway in Fontana, California, as a non-championship US vs. Japan event, running alongside the JGTC race as part of the non-championship GT Live event. Manabu Orido resigned as a judge at the end of the season to become a driver.

The other regular staff for the 2005 season were D1 girls Kazumi Kondo (近藤和美) and Hatsuno Sugaya (菅谷はつ乃) who previously had careers as JGTC race queens. For the 2006 season, Hatsuno was replaced by Jyuri Tamashiro (玉城珠里).

As the series has always been Japanese dominated with few non-Japanese making it to the best 16, in the first round of the 2005 season, after narrowly beating Masato Kawabata who spun during their tsuiso round battle, Rhys Millen became the first non-Japanese driver to advance to the best eight round. He lost to Yasuyuki Kazama after a sudden death tsuiso battle. That year saw the introduction of the D1 Street Legal category which was unveiled at the Odaiba round, for cars which are built to be driven on the road.

The series' only guest commentator was the TV presenter, singer, Super GT driver and amateur drifter Hiromi Kozono (ヒロミ; real kanji name 小園 浩巳) who guest commentated at the 2005 Odaiba Allstar event.

In October 2005, the D1GP ventured to Europe with an exhibition round at Silverstone, Northamptonshire, UK. This event provided an upset, as after putting on a good performance in the first run, the Irishman Darren McNamara advanced to the best eight round after overtaking the series regular Hiroshi Fukuda on the first run. Like Rhys Millen in the first round, McNamara fell victim to Kazama after losing four to six then tying in the other round. With a crowd attendance of five thousand, in the following year the D1GP ran its own national series in the UK.

At the non-championship D1 USA vs Japan Allstar Exhibition at Irwindale Speedway in December 2005, the series had its first non-Japanese winner for both car and driver: Vaughn Gittin Jr. with his Ford Mustang GT. At the following season opener in March 2006, Samuel Hübinette with his Dodge Viper SRT/10 took things further by making it into the best 8 by beating Gittin in a sudden death tsuiso battle, Hubinette made it to the semi-final when he defeated Takahiro Ueno, only to be beaten by Nobushige Kumakubo in his Subaru Impreza GDB. Kumakubo went on into the finals to be beaten by Yasuyuki Kazama, who won his third successive first round championship event.

In 2006, the D1 Grand Prix (D1GP) expanded into Malaysia and New Zealand, primarily through driver search events. Successful participants in these national series were eligible to compete in a non-championship event at Irwindale Speedway. Following an exhibition event in the United Kingdom, judge Keiichi Tsuchiya invited three drivers from the UK series to participate in the final rounds. Darren McNamara was the only invited driver to qualify for the points-scoring round using his own vehicle, reaching the quarter-finals in both events before being eliminated by Ken Nomura. Following the conclusion of the UK franchise that year, McNamara transitioned to the United States D1GP series.

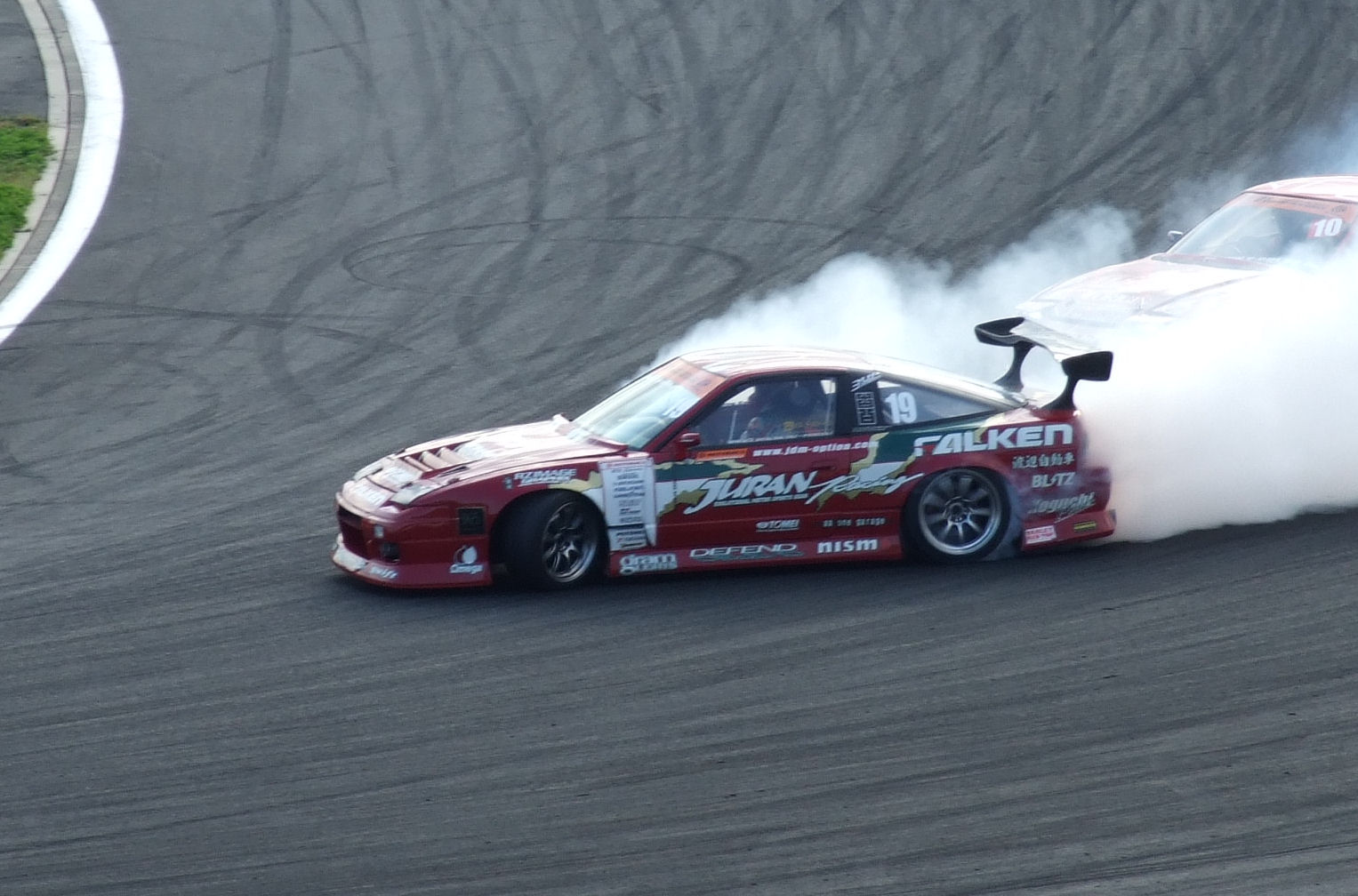
Yoshinori Koguchi drifting the Koguchi Power 180SX at D1GP Fuji Speedway 2007

In 2007, the former D1GP driver, Hisashi Kamimoto retired from driving to join as judge. The D1 Gals of 2006 was replaced by the "D1 Sisters" who were audition winners and representative of the agency D-Sign, consisting of Hiromi Goto, Yuria Tachiki, Asami Kikuchi and Ayaka Tashiro.

Since the series began, Video Option has always covered all of the official D1GP events. Its English language sister title JDM Option, which was established in 2004, also covers the events. In 2007, the sports channel, J Sports ESPN began screening highlights of the series with Suzuki and Nomura as presenters, with the D1 Sisters making guest appearances.

For the 2009 season, the US arm underwent a new management team to kickstart a new domestic series Tsuchiya, who was also on the executive board, stepped down when the organization went under new management.

In December 2010, Keiichi Tsuchiya and Daijiro Inada both decided to resign from D1GP due to consistent irresponsible management.

The following year saw the first time D1GP will continue without Tsuchiya nor Inada, Hisashi Kamimoto who was part of the judge is promoted to chief judge and assisted by Akira Iida, Shinichi Yamaji, Eiji Yamada and Ryusuke Kawasaki, the Tanso Champions is awarded for the driver with the best Solo run driver and Tanso Winner is awarded for the best qualifier for each round. In the same year Youichi Imamura winning his fourth and last title making him driver with the most D1GP title.

The year 2014 saw the ban on nitrous oxide, a gas commonly seen to add power to engines in motorsport, causing teams to use larger turbochargers or displacement engines.

Since 2018 D1GP has streamed all of its round and its feeder series D1 Lights from YouTube for free with Japanese and English language stream on their official channel D1GP MOVIE CHANNEL.

In 2022 D1 Grand Prix started the "Next 10 Years" Project in order to develop an appeal for D1 for the upcoming 10 years by creating a competition that could be enjoyed even more and make an environment which makes it easier for the teams and drivers to compete in the competition and at the same time creating new standards for safety and fairness and competition.

== Road to D1 ==
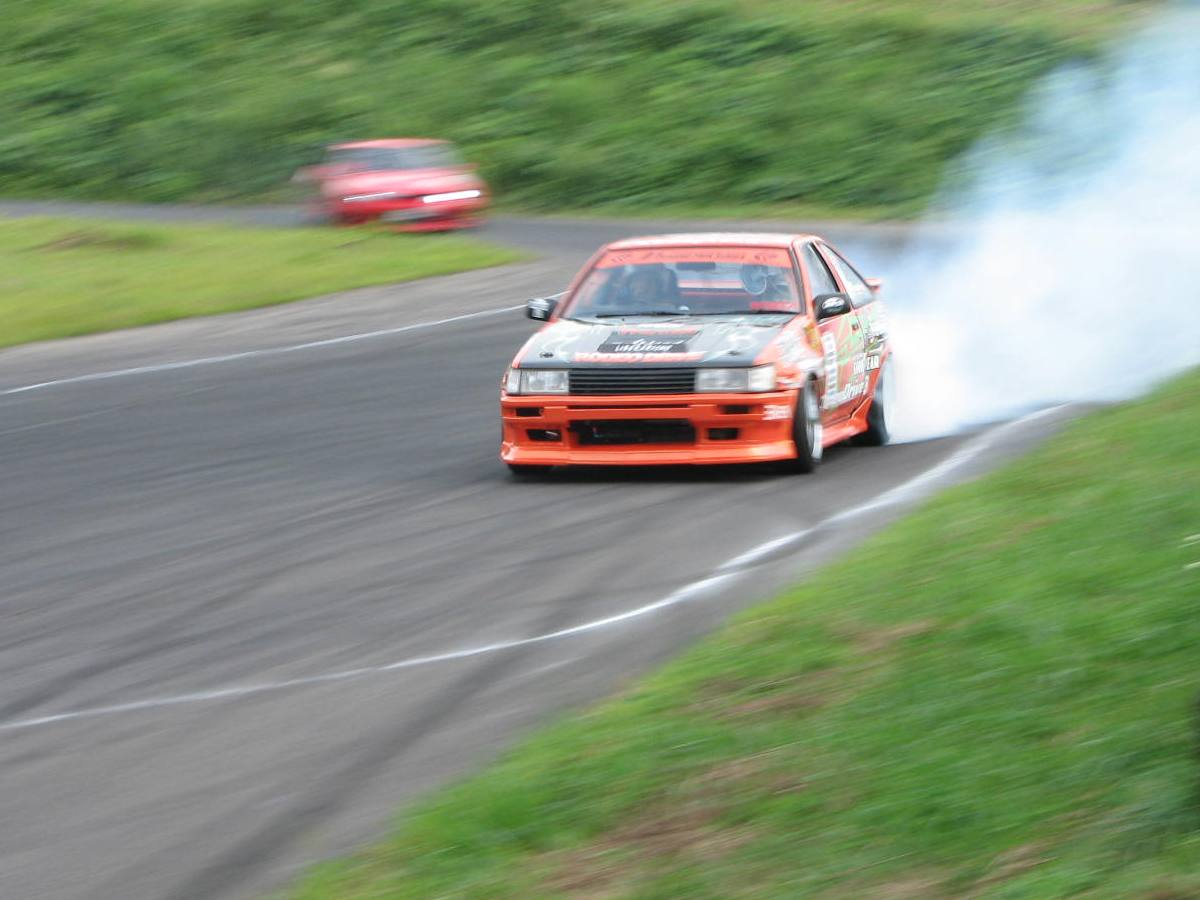
A Toyota Corolla Levin AE86 adorning an official D1GP sunvisor during a practice run

Usually, drivers in Japan have to make it to the top of the championship table in one of four major national drifting series':

- Advan Drift Meeting
- A'PEX Cup
- ORC Drift Championship
- BN Sports D1 Drift Championship

Outside Japan, drivers have to enter a Driver Search. Once they have qualified, they receive a D1 License, which enables them to enter the qualifying rounds and the newly introduced national series, plus the exhibition events that they are invited to.

In a championship event, usually entries are restricted to one hundred cars. Each car gets an allocation of three individual tansou (solo run) qualifying runs: only the best one counts. At the end of the day, the top twenty qualifiers join the ten seeded cars who are determined by the top ten on the D1GP championship tables. The seeded drivers are usually a red background on their number to identify them.

On race day, after two sets of practice runs are done through, competitors will go through a starting ceremony which they will be introduced to the crowds and then a driver will be rounded up in group of fours and be given a set of three qualifying runs to make it into the best 16 tsuiso (twin run) round battles, which involves two cars drifting simultaneously. The Tansou groups would be given, Priority A, B and C. "A" indicates seeded drivers and "C" indicates as qualifiers. The Tansou rounds always starts with the series leader and then goes through to the last driver with the highest number, which usually indicates that he is a qualifier. At the end of the drivers three rounds, only the best run counts and on each run, they are judged with an assistance of a DriftBox, which determines angle, keeping to the correct racing line and speed. That will be given a score up to a maximum of 100.0, should a driver score that point, he will be given a bonus score of 1 point which will be added to his score they accumulates during the tsuiou round.

At the end when all drivers are judged, the judges picks the sixteen drivers for the tsuiou round, the highest scoring driver will be paired up against the sixteenth highest scorer, the second highest will be paired against the fifteenth highest and so on. Between this and the following tsuiou round, there is a pit walk session at the paddock area for spectators, usually off-limits to them, where they can get close to the D1 personnel, drivers and cars. This usually lasts up to an hour which the crowds disembark back to the crowd area ready for the tsuiou round.

During a tsuiso round battle, one car follows another through the course, attempting to keep up with or even pass the car in front. It does not matter if the drifting line is wrong: it matters who has the most exciting drift. Normally, the leading car usually produces a maximum angle drift, but still closes off the inside line to prevent passing. The chasing car usually drifts with less angle, but very close to the lead car. However, the chasing car does not even have to keep up. In fact, in some cases, if a car that was left behind on the straight manages produces a beautiful drift, it could win that round. A spin, under-steer, or collision, results in a disqualification and a zero score for the offending party in that battle.

At the final round, the two finalists will be gathered in front of the judging stand, which they park up together and stand by their car to be formally addressed by the judges, the driver would return to the starting line to continue with their last sets of tsuiou rounds. Until 2004, there was a third place playoff for the losing semi finalists, which has been dropped. Should there be no sudden death rounds being called up, the finalists would return in front of the judging area with the losing drivers, who would return from the starting line; where the winner's name will be called up be the lead judge, which a large trophy and bottle of champagne will be presented to them by the D1 Gals. A cheque would usually be presented to the top three drivers, the winner's cheque is usually worth ¥1million or $5000 in US events. After the name is announced, in some event, the driver would be given a toss-up by competitors, a common tradition in some sports and usually the spectators will be invited onto the track.

Each D1 Licence is valid for an entire season. Drivers who finish in the top 16 of points will retain their licence for the next year. Drivers who finish below are relegated and must attempt to qualify for a licence at a qualifying school (such as Driver Search or a national drifting series).

== Typical D1GP vehicle regulations ==
Considering the fact that the D1GP is a series geared towards production cars only, there are a number of different race regulations that the vehicle must undergo in order to be eligible to compete. They are:

- Only rear wheel drive is permitted. The vehicle must be a standard production, road-going model from a major vehicle manufacturer. It may also be converted from front-wheel drive, or all wheel drive.
  - Vehicles constructed by a vehicle manufacturer solely for the purpose of racing are prohibited.
- The vehicle must retain the original chassis/body—only stock body constructed from a vehicle manufacturer is allowed.
  - No tube frame vehicles or tube frame chassis extensions are permissible unless part of the OEM structure
  - Space frame chassis are not permitted, additional triangulation and bracing of suspension turret/mounting points is allowed so long as the car vehicle contains its original monocoque chassis.
  - Vehicles must retain their original VIN in its OEM position as well as the OEM chassis plate where applicable -- VIN must not be altered, clearly visible and readable.
  - Convertible vehicles must have a hard top installed and a roll cage which will be effective in the event of a vehicle rolling onto its roof. The hard top must be securely fastened to the body.
  - The vehicles appearance must be similar to that of the original vehicle.
- Semi-Slick Tires/DOT-R Compounds (S-Tires) were prohibited after the first season as they are not road legal, after Nobuteru Taniguchi used them to win the championship in 2001. The series now only permits commercially available road tires approved by the organization.
- Catalytic converters must be installed to keep the vehicle to the maximum noise limit at race circuits.

In the past, Drivers’ Search rules were more lenient to that of the championship rules until 2005, which the same rules apply to this day.

== Track ==
With the series being Japanese based, all but one D1 Grand Prix venue is located in Japan. When it first started, the round is held at small circuit such as Nikko and Ebisu circuit. In 2003, D1 Grand Prix held a round at pre-renovated Fuji Speedway marking the competition's first visit to an international race track. In the same year, an exhibition match is held at Irwindale Circuit in California, United States which later become the only venue outside of Japan to have held a championship round in 2004 to 2006. With the inclusion of Okayama (formerly TI Circuit Aida) to 2008 schedule, D1 Grand Prix has hold at least one round in all circuit that hold a Formula One Grand Prix in Japan.

In 2004, D1GP held an exhibition match and later championship round at Odaiba NOP parking lot. This mark D1's first "special course". This means that the layout of the track is not tied to the existing track as in a permanent circuit due to it being held on an open space so it is easily configured to the competition needs. The venue is also usually more accessible than a permanent race track as it is usually located in urban area. The special course remains a feature on D1 calendar with other venue such as Okuibuki Motor Park and Centrair. Central Circuit in Hyogo prefecture is supposed to hold a round in 2020 season but cancelled due to the COVID-19 pandemic and did not return.

As the cars became more powerful, D1GP started to move away from smaller tracks such as Nikko circuit and Bihoku Highland but D1 Street Legal and later D1 Lights remain using the smaller track.

Ebisu Circuit has held the most rounds across its three tracks with Drift Stadium also known as Minami or South course, held the most rounds as the venue featured from 2001 to 2021 before being converted into a dirt track. The venue for D1GP is moved to the West also known as Nishi course which previously held D1 Street Legal and an Individual D1GP round in 2020.

- Bold, denote current D1GP venue.
- italics, denote current D1 Lights venue.

No	Venue	Type	Season(s)
1	(Japan) Aichi Sky Expo	Special Course	2026
2	(Japan) Autopolis	Race Track	2004–2012, 2014, 2018–present
3	(Japan) Bihoku Highland	Mini Circuit	2001–2003
4	(Japan) Centrair	Special Course	2012–2013
5	(Japan) Ebisu Drift Stadium	Mini Circuit	2001–2021
6	(Japan) Ebisu West	Mini Circuit	2020, 2022–present
7	(Japan) Ebisu West Banking	Mini Circuit	2022
8	(Japan) Fuji Speedway	Race Track	2003, 2005–2011, 2014, 2016, 2022
9	(United States) Irwindale Speedway	Race Track	2004–2006
10	(Japan) Huis Ten Bosch	Special Course	2013
11	(Japan) Nikko Circuit	Mini Circuit	2001–2002
12	(Japan) Odaiba	Special Course	2004–2005, 2010–2018, 2023–present
13	(Japan) Okayama International Circuit	Race Track	2008–2011
14	(Japan) Okuibuki Motor Park	Special Course	2020–2025
15	(Japan) Osaka Maishima	Special Course	2013, 2014, 2017–2018
16	(Japan) Sekia Hills	Mini Circuit	2002–2003
17	(Japan) Sportsland Sugo	Race Track	2005–2007
18	(Japan) Sportsland Sugo (Kart)	Mini Circuit	2004
19	(Japan) Suzuka Circuit	Special Course	2006–2008, 2011–2015
20	(Japan) Tokachi International Speedway	Race Track	2018–2019
21	(Japan) Tsukuba Circuit	Race Track	2002–2005, 2017–2021, 2023–present

== D1 Street Legal ==
As the D1GP category was moving away from its grassroots during the earlier days, and budgets and development costs were getting higher, the organisers introduced the D1 Street Legal (D1ストリートリーガル (D1 sutoriito riigaru in katakana), as D1SL) category at the Odaiba round in 2005 for road driven cars which were different from the main category as they are trailer driven between races.

Being a budget series, this meant that there is tighter restrictions on how a car can be modified. For example, the car must have a working car stereo system and must have the original engine which it was originally supplied with. Also there is no wide body extension and wings must be within the width of the car. The car must also retain many of its original features, especially dashboard, doors, etc. which sometimes can be replaced/removed/modified in the D1GP category. In all the car has to prove its road-worthiness by its entrant providing a shaken certificate.

Initially, the new series was treated to two exhibition rounds in 2005, and was given a full seven round the following year. Although the series is geared towards novice drifters, it also attracts D1GP star drivers including the Suenaga brothers, Masao and Naoto, many of its former D1GP regulars, and fan-favourites like Ken Nomura.

In 2006, the organisers started a divisional series called D1SL Divisional Series which does not require a D1 License and is broken up in four regions: north, south, east, and west, with rounds that consist of 3 to 4 events in each region and a point scoring system that is the same as the other series'. The winner of the series at the end is awarded a D1 License.

In 2017, the organisers announced the end of the D1 Street Legal series, being replaced by the D1 Lights series from 2018 onwards.

=== Typical D1 Street Legal vehicle regulations ===
Although the items that are prohibited in D1GP also applies in D1SL, additional prohibited items in D1SL cars include:

- Sequential transmission.
- Fuel cells.
- Carbon/beamless/FRP door replacements, must be OEM doors with side impact bars intact if possible.
- Airjacks.
- Tubbed fenders/one-off metal body components, must be one that is available to the public.
- Custom/standalone relay/fuse switchboxes.
- Acrylic glass/polycarbonate window inserts and replacements, must be OEM glass.
- complete dash replacement parts, must be stock.

Other restrictions in the category are that:

- Spoilers must stay within the width of the vehicle.
- Brakes must be stock dimensions; no swaps from other models of same make are allowed.
- Vehicles must retain OEM parts (ac/navigation/heater)
- A functioning car audio system must be in place.
- A 6-point roll cage with 4-point harness must be in place (same as that of D1GP).
- Restriction of engine swaps from other model into other model, as S15 Silvia Spec-S to Spec-R specification (SR20DE→SR20DET) may be permitted but a RB26DETT into an HR32 Skyline GTS-t is not unless the model is a BNR32, nor even is converting an AE85 to AE86 is permitted. Engines from other manufacturer's car (e.g. Darren McNamara's 13B-REW powered AE86) are not permitted as well. A bolt on turbocharger or supercharger is permitted, the engine in the car can be determined by the VIN plate

== D1 Lights ==
D1 Lights replaced D1 Street Legal from 2018 onwards, unlike D1 Street Legal the car now must be a competition only car and no longer street registered. This were implemented to help better bridge the gap between D1 Grand Prix and its feeder series.

The safety of the series is also increased after a spotter was fatally struck by a wheel that came loose during a practice session in the final round of 2016 D1 Street Legal. This accident led to the round being completely cancelled and the D1 Street Legal not continuing in 2017.

The series kicked off with a pre-season event at Nikko Circuit, followed by the first round at Maze Circuit. Daisuke Saito became the first winner of D1 Lights, the first series champion was Junya Ishikawa who graduated to D1GP the following year, while Naoki Nakamura who won twice regained his D1GP license and also graduated to D1GP.

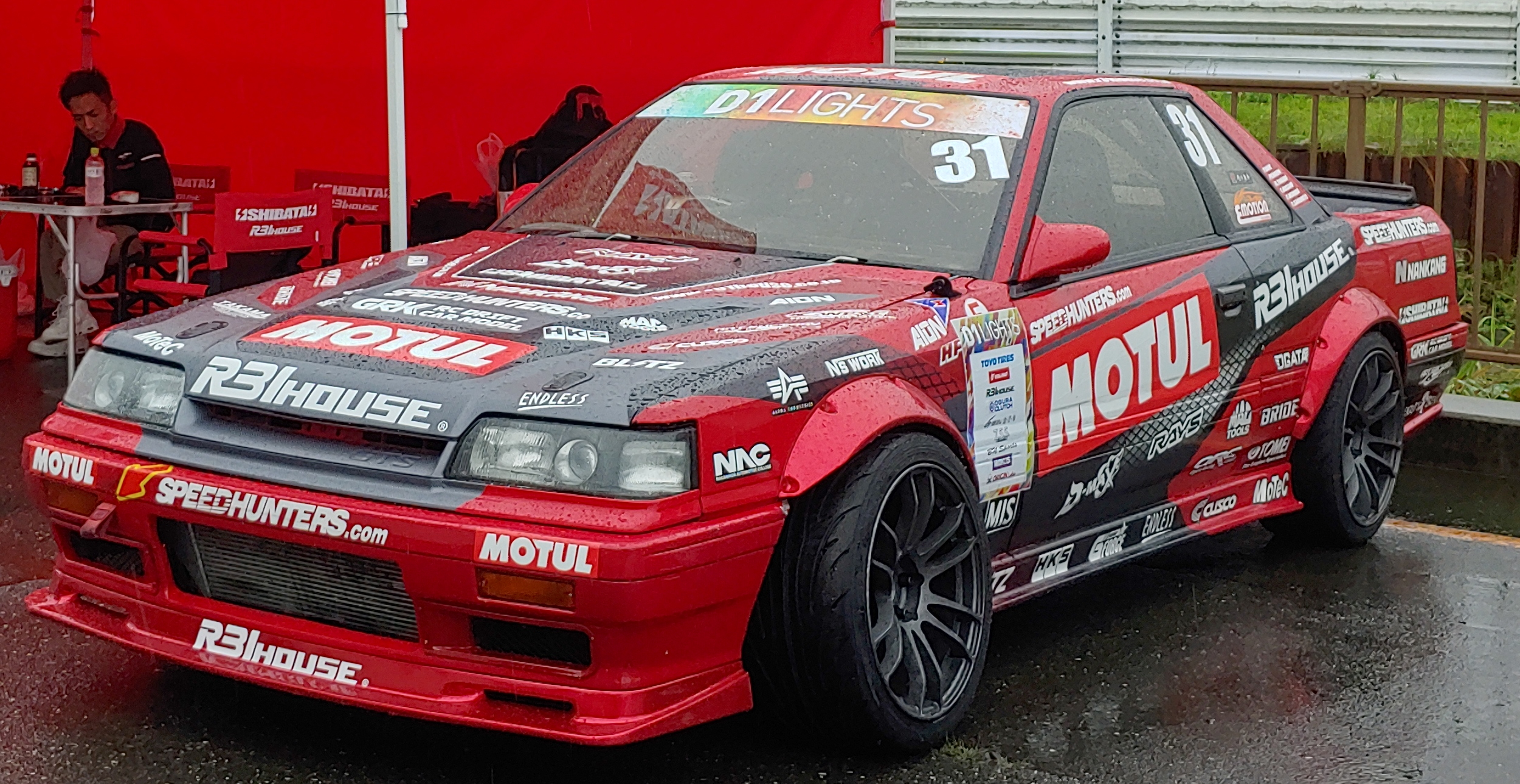
A Nissan GTS-R used in D1 Lights at Tsukuba Circuit

In 2019 for the first time D1GP and D1 Lights were held in the same venue during same weekend at Autopolis, which was the final round for both series. The same would happen again twice in the following year, with the season opener and in Ebisu West.

D1 Lights initially live streamed on D1GP Movie Channel but moved to Video Option's YouTube channel in 2023.

On final two round of 2024 season, D1 Lights experimented with Top 24 tournament last seen in 2014 D1GP season and targeted to be use from 2025 and beyond. The system is later integrated starting from 2025 season for selected rounds.

As of 2026, all D1 Lights champion had graduated to D1 Grand Prix with 2024 season had all previous Lights champion up to 2023 competed in the series which was not seen with D1 Street Legal. However 2025 champion, Genki Mogami compete in D1GP in his one and only season in 2023, two years before eventually becoming Lights champion.

== D1 National Series ==
During the 2005 exhibition event at Silverstone, a domestic series was announced with a plan to run the UK round as part of the world series for the following year, though plans for a point scoring round at that location never materialised. The series took over where the Autoglym Drift Championship left off, which was formerly run by the OPT Drift Club, an offshoot of a tuning business called Option Motorsport. The club held a championship in 2002 called D1UK (the previous moniker), though not related to the magazine, for the 2004 season, the business was forced to drop the Option and D1 name for legal reasons.

The difference between the Autoglym series, which was sponsored by the car care product manufacturer, and the D1GB is that the former had a separate championship for beginners called Clubmans which was run in a tansou (solo run) format only and did not require the common safety amenities (e.g. rollcages), and the latter is a main championship for experienced drivers which consists of the usual tsuiso (twin run) rounds. The other difference is, D1 regulation is more stringent on car modifications. The club was since absorbed into the D1 franchise as a national series.

The GB series, was followed by a Malaysia series (D1MY), though the series and drivers' search began earlier than its UK counterpart due to the difference in climate with its first round in March, compared with the UK series in May. The MY series tends to have the privilege of having Tsuchiya to judge the rounds, whereas the UK series only had Dorikin and Manabu Suzuki as judges in Round 2, on the weekend of the D1GP exhibition event. The New Zealand series are currently run as a drivers' search rounds, which awards a D1 License to the winners and allow the top four to compete in the world exhibition event in the US in December.

At the end of the season, the series went through a major technical hitch as the D1 organisation refused to foot the fee to import the top 5 cars to Irwindale as promised, therefore the organizers of the D1GB dissolved its association with the D1 organisation and formed the European Drift Championship (EDC) which uses the same rule as the series itself. As a compromise, the D1 organisation instead gave the top three drivers a chance to compete in US based cars for both the point scoring and World All-Star round. The D1 franchise would itself move to the US after three seasons of being opening points scoring round.

=== Drifting team list ===
- Team Orange D1 world drifting champions is led by Nobushige Kumakubo and directed by Hiroki Furuse aka "Sleepy" - Team Orange's Manager. He is also EDC Judge for European Drift Championship. He was consultant for the Codemasters video game, Race Driver: Grid and also with Team Orange. They played as stunt drivers in the feature film The Fast and the Furious: Tokyo Drift, produced by Universal. In 2011, they did a Tuning Film Documentary written and directed by Diego Vida and produced by FanVision.

== Broadcast ==
D1 Grand Prix coverage were never televised but the event coverage covered in Video Option and separate playback in VHS and DVD format for both D1GP and D1 Street Legal. However the production of it stopped as Sunpros DVD product such as Video Option and Drift Tengoku were shifted to YouTube in 2018.

Live Stream of the event initially started in Niconico platform but also moved to YouTube in 2018 with the stream available as VOD after the stream is finished. Initially the livestream was stream on D1GP MOVIE CHANNEL but in 2023 the channel only stream for paying membership with free livestream moved to Video Option channel.

Manabu Suzuki is in charge of main commentator since the series first started. He usually accompanied by Naoki Tsuji but he is moved to YouTube commentary for the free livestream. Ryusuke Kawasaki and Ken Nomura also often accompanied Suzuki in commentary booth. Drivers who did not qualify for the battle usually help with judging and pit reporter and since 2023 two driver would join the commentary to give their opinion and analysis beside the regular commentator.

Free livestream is also available in English with Japan-based Australian YouTuber Alexi Smith aka Noriyaro as commentary, voicing over the Japanese stream on same channel. The English stream was initially discontinued for 2025 but due to high demand it returned on Noriyaro channel. American D1 Divisional driver Kyle Cooney joined Smith in 2024 but did not return following the English stream discontinuation

Live stream for DOSS Scoring system also available to public for free.

== Championship winners ==
As of 2025, 13 different drivers have won the D1 Grand Prix championship. Youichi Imamura hold the most championship with four. Imamura also hold the most consecutive titles with 3, winning it from 2009 to 2011. Masato Kawabata, Masashi Yokoi and Hideyuki Fujino hold the second most championship with 3 each. Naoki Nakamura hold the most D1 Street Legal championship with 3 winning it in 2009, 2010 and 2014. Kojiro Mekuwa hold the most titles in D1 Lights with 2 winning it in 2019 and 2020. Youchi Imamura is the youngest championship winner at 27 years old when he won his first championship in 2003 while Hideyuki Fujino is the oldest champion at 51 years old when he won his third championship in 2025. 3 driver in Katsuhiro Ueo, Masashi Yokoi and Naoki Nakamura have won both D1 Grand Prix and Street Legal championship. Ueo won the GP title first in 2002 and SL in 2016 while both Yokoi and Nakamura won the SL title first. Naoki Nakamura is the only multiple champion in both D1 Grand Prix and D1 Street Legal.

Nobuteru Taniguchi is the first D1 Grand Prix as well as professional drifting champion in 2001. The first D1 Street Legal champion is Takashi Hagisako in the 2006 season while D1 Lights first champion is Junya Ishikawa in the 2018 season. Hideyuki Fujino is the current D1 Grand Prix champion while Genki Mogami is the current D1 Lights champion. 5 Grand Prix championship have been won with a round to spare with the earliest being on the quarter final of the penultimate round when Naoki Nakamura won the 2021 season. Nobushige Kumakubo is the only driver to win the championship outside of Japan in 2006 when the final round was held at Irwindale Speedway. Koudai Sobagiri is the newest first-time champion winning it in 2026.

=== By Year ===
==== Driver's champions ====
Year	Series	Driver	Team	Tires	Car	Engine
2001	D1GP	Nobuteru Taniguchi	After Fire	Yokohama	Nissan Silvia S15	Nissan SR20 I4
2002	D1GP	Katsuhiro Ueo	D'SIFT w/ Cusco Japan	Bridgestone	Toyota Sprinter Trueno AE86	Toyota 4AGE I4
2003	D1GP	Youichi Imamura	A'PEXi	Bridgestone	Mazda RX-7 FD3S	Mazda 13B Rotary
2004	D1GP	Ryuji Miki	Top Secret	Bridgestone	Nissan Silvia S15	Nissan SR20 I4
2005	D1GP	Yasuyuki Kazama	Kei-Office	Bridgestone	Nissan Silvia S15	Nissan SR20 I4
2006	D1GP	Nobushige Kumakubo	Team Orange w/ Yuke's and Cusco Japan	Yokohama	Subaru Impreza GDB	Subaru EJ25 F4
2006	D1SL	Takashi Hagisako	Clearance	Yokohama	Nissan Silvia PS13	Nissan SR20 I4
2007	D1GP	Masato Kawabata	Team TOYO with GP Sports	Toyo Tires	Nissan Silvia S15	Nissan SR20 I4
2007	D1SL	Kazuya Matsukawa	Zip's	Bridgestone	Nissan 180SX	Nissan SR20 I4
2008	D1GP	Daigo Saito	Team 22 Nino/Fnatz Professional Garage	Bridgestone	Toyota Mark II JZX100	Toyota 2JZ I6
2008	D1SL	Naoto Suenaga	Ebisu Circuit Drift Xtreme w/Agent K	Yokohama	Nissan Silvia PS13	Nissan SR20 I4
2009	D1GP	Youichi Imamura	Team Auto Produce Boss w/ Potenza	Bridgestone	Nissan Silvia S15	Nissan SR20 I4
2009	D1SL	Naoki Nakamura	D-Max	Federal	Nissan Silvia S15	Nissan SR20 I4
2010	D1GP	Youichi Imamura	M7 Boss SGC w/ Dunlop	Dunlop	Nissan Silvia S15	Nissan SR20 I4
2010	D1SL	Naoki Nakamura	D-Max	Yokohama	Nissan Silvia S13	Nissan SR20 I4
2011	D1GP	Youichi Imamura	SGC Boss w/ Dunlop	Dunlop	Nissan Silvia S15	Nissan SR20 I4
2011	D1SL	Seimi Tanaka	D-Max	Federal	Nissan Silvia S13	Nissan SR20 I4
2012	D1GP	Nobushige Kumakubo	YUKE'S Team Orange with BEAST EYE	Yokohama	Nissan Laurel C33	Nissan RB26 I6
2012	D1SL	Masashi Yokoi	MCR Factory with D-MAX	Federal	Nissan Silvia S14	Nissan SR20 I4
2013	D1GP	Masato Kawabata	TEAM TOYO with GP SPORTS	Toyo Tires	Nissan 180SX (RPS13)	Nissan SR20 I4
2013	D1SL	Yusuke Kitaoka	Super Autobacs Tokorozawa with Ebisu Circuit	Federal	Toyota Chaser JZX100	Toyota 1JZ I6
2014	D1GP	Kuniaki Takahashi	GOODYEAR Racing with KUNNY'Z	Goodyear	Toyota Mark X (GRX130)	Toyota 2JZ I6
2014	D1SL	Naoki Nakamura	ORIGIN Labo. with R･Y･O	Federal	Nissan Silvia S13	Nissan SR20 I4
2015	D1GP	Masato Kawabata	Team TOYO TIRES DRIFT TRUST RACING	Toyo Tires	Nissan GT-R	Nissan VR38 V6
2015	D1SL	Yusuke Kitaoka	Team Ito Auto with GOODYEAR	Goodyear	Toyota Mark II JZX100	Toyota 1JZ I6
2016	D1GP	Daigo Saito	Wanli Fat Five Racing	Wanli	Toyota Chaser JZX100	Toyota 2JZ I6
2016	D1SL	Katsuhiro Ueo	Z.S.S. with SIFT & ブレイン	Zestino	Nissan Silvia S15	Nissan SR20 I4
2017	D1GP	Hideyuki Fujino	Wisteria Toyo Tires	Toyo Tires	Nissan 180SX RPS13	Toyota 2JZ I6
2017	D1SL	Not held				
2018	D1GP	Masashi Yokoi	D-MAX	Nankang	Nissan Silvia S15	Toyota 2JZ I6
2018	D1LT	Junya Ishikawa	nichiei racing TKL	Goodride	Nissan Silvia S14	Nissan SR20 I4
2019	D1GP	Masashi Yokoi	D-MAX Racing Team	Nankang	Nissan Silvia S15	Toyota 2JZ I6
2019	D1LT	Kojiro Mekuwa	Real Style	Tri-Ace	Nissan Silvia S13	Nissan SR20 I4
2020	D1GP	Masanori Kohashi	LingLong Tire Drift Team Orange	Linglong	Nissan Silvia S15	Toyota 2JZ I6
2020	D1LT	Kojiro Mekuwa	Realstyle ORIGIN Labo. VALINO	Valino	Nissan 180SX RPS13	Nissan SR20 I4
2021	D1GP	Naoki Nakamura	MUGEN PLUS team ALIVE VALINO	Valino	Nissan Silvia S15	Toyota 2JZ I6
2021	D1LT	Hiroki Vito	TEAM VALINO TOPTUL Champion	Valino	Nissan Silvia S13	Nissan SR20 I4
2022	D1GP	Masashi Yokoi	D-Max Racing Team	Nankang	Nissan Silvia S15	Toyota 2JZ I6
2022	D1LT	Yuki Tano	House Innovation Racing Team	Toyo Tires	Nissan Silvia S15	Nissan SR20 I4
2023	D1GP	Hideyuki Fujino	Team Toyo Tires Drift	Toyo Tires	Toyota GR86 ZN8	Toyota 2JZ I6
2023	D1LT	Hisato Yonai	GreenTop × 酒の中村 × AES	Valino	Nissan 180SX RPS13	Nissan SR20 I4
2024	D1GP	Naoki Nakamura	Valino × N-Style	Valino	Nissan Silvia S13	Chevrolet LSX V8
2024	D1LT	Kenshiro Wada	House Innovation Racing Team	Valino	Nissan 180SX RPS13	Nissan SR20 I4
2025	D1GP	Hideyuki Fujino	Team Toyo Tires Drift-1	Toyo Tires	Toyota GR86 ZN8	Toyota 2JZ I6
2025	D1LT	Genki Mogami	MCR Factory Shibatire D-MAX	Shibatire	Nissan 180SX RPS13	Nissan SR20 I4
2026	D1GP	Koudai Sobagiri	Shibata Racing Team	Shibatire	Toyota GR86 ZN8	Nissan VR38 V6
2026	D1LT					

==== Tanso (solo run) champions (awarded since 2011) ====
Year	Driver	Team	Car
2001-10	Not awarded		
2011	Daigo Saito	Premium Japan with Daigo	Toyota Chaser (X100)
2012	Kuniaki Takahashi	Goodyear Racing with Kunny'z	Toyota Mark X (X130)
2013	Masato Kawabata	Team Toyo with GP Sports	Nissan 180SX (RPS13)
2014	Masao Suenaga	Team RE Amemiya Sunoco	Mazda RX-7 (FD3S)
2015	Akinori Utsumi	RC926 with Toyo Tires	Nissan Silvia (S15)
2016	Daigo Saito	Wanli Fat Five Racing	Toyota Chaser (X100)
2017	Hideyuki Fujino	Wisteria Toyo Tires	Nissan 180SX (RPS13)
2018	Masato Kawabata	Toyo Tires Glion Trust Racing	Nissan GT-R (R35)
2019	Yusuke Kitaoka	Team Mori	Toyota Mark II (X100)
2020	Masashi Yokoi	Nankang Tire Drift Team D-Max	Nissan Silvia (S15)
2021	Naoki Nakamura	MUGEN PLUS team ALIVE VALINO	Nissan Silvia (S15)
2022	Masato Kawabata	Team Toyo Tires Drift	Toyota GR86 (ZN8)
2023	Hideyuki Fujino	Team Toyo Tires Drift	Toyota GR86 (ZN8)
2024	Naoki Nakamura	Valino × N-Style	Nissan Silvia (S13)
2025	Koudai Sobagiri	Shibata Racing Team	Toyota GR86 (ZN8)
2026	Koudai Sobagiri	Shibata Racing Team	Toyota GR86 (ZN8)

==== Teams' champions ====
Year	Team	Driver(s)	Car(s)
2001-13	Not awarded		
2014	GOODYEAR Racing with kunny'z	Kuniaki Takahashi	Toyota Mark X (X130)
2015	Team TOYO TIRES DRIFT TRUST RACING	Masato Kawabata	Nissan GT-R (R35)
2016	Wanli Fat Five Racing	Daigo Saito	Toyota Chaser (X100)
2017	D-MAX	Masashi Yokoi	Nissan Silvia (S15)
2017	D-MAX	Akira Hirajima	Nissan Silvia (S15)
2018	D-MAX	Masashi Yokoi	Nissan Silvia (S15)
2018	D-MAX	Akira Hirajima	Nissan Silvia (S15)
2019	D-MAX RACING TEAM	Masashi Yokoi	Nissan Silvia (S15)
2019	D-MAX RACING TEAM	Charles NG	Nissan Silvia (S15)
2020	LINGLONG TIRE DRIFT Team ORANGE	Masanori Kohashi	Nissan Silvia (S15)
2020	LINGLONG TIRE DRIFT Team ORANGE	Naoto Suenaga	Nissan Silvia (S15)
2021	MUGEN PLUS team ALIVE VALINO	Naoki Nakamura	Nissan Silvia (S15)
2022	D-MAX RACING TEAM	Masashi Yokoi	Nissan Silvia (S15)
2022	D-MAX RACING TEAM	Masao Suenaga	Nissan Silvia (S15)
2023	Team Toyo Tires Drift	Hideyuki Fujino	Toyota GR86 (ZN8)
2023	Team Toyo Tires Drift	Masato Kawabata	Toyota GR86 (ZN8)
2024	Shibata Racing Team	Koudai Sobagiri	Toyota GR86 (ZN8)
2024	Shibata Racing Team	Tetsuya Hibino	Toyota GR86 (ZN8)
2025	Team TOYO TIRES DRIFT 1	Hideyuki Fujino	Toyota GR86 (ZN8)
2025	Team TOYO TIRES DRIFT 1	Masato Kawabata	Toyota GR86 (ZN8)
2026	Mind Control Racing Shibatire	Masashi Yokoi	Nissan Silvia (S14)

=== By Driver ===
==== D1 Grand Prix ====
===== Overall championship =====
Driver	Title(s)	Season(s)	Car(s)
Yoichi Imamura	4	2003, 2009, 2010, 2011	Mazda RX-7 (FD3S), 2003; Nissan Silvia (S15), 2009–2011
Masato Kawabata	3	2007, 2013, 2015	Nissan Silvia (S15), 2007; Nissan 180SX (RPS13), 2013; Nissan GT-R (R35), 2015
Masashi Yokoi	3	2018, 2019, 2022	Nissan Silvia (S15)
Hideyuki Fujino	3	2017, 2023, 2025	Nissan 180SX (RPS13), 2017; Toyota GR86 (ZN8), 2023,2025
Nobushige Kumakubo	2	2006, 2012	Subaru Impreza WRX (GDB), 2006; Nissan Laurel (C33), 2012
Daigo Saito	2	2008, 2016	Toyota Mark II (X100), 2008; Toyota Chaser (X100), 2016
Naoki Nakamura	2	2021, 2024	Nissan Silvia (S15), 2021; Nissan Silvia (S13), 2024
Nobuteru Taniguchi	1	2001	Nissan Silvia (S15)
Katsuhiro Ueo	1	2002	Toyota Sprinter Trueno (AE85)
Ryuji Miki	1	2004	Nissan Silvia (S15)
Yasuyuki Kazama	1	2005	Nissan Silvia (S15)
Kuniaki Takahashi	1	2014	Toyota Mark X (GRX130)
Masanori Kohashi	1	2020	Nissan Silvia (S15)
Koudai Sobagiri	1	2026	Toyota GR86 (ZN8)

==== D1 Street Legal & D1 Lights ====
===== Overall championship =====
Driver	Title(s)	Season(s)	Details	Car(s)
Naoki Nakamura	3	2009, 2010, 2014	D1 Street Legal	Nissan Silvia (S15), 2009; Nissan Silvia (S13), 2010, 2014
Yusuke Kitaoka	2	2013, 2015	D1 Street Legal	Toyota Mark II (JZX100)
Kojiro Mekuwa	2	2019, 2020	D1 Lights	Nissan Silvia (S13), 2019; Nissan 180SX (RPS13), 2020
Takashi Hagisako	1	2006	D1 Street Legal	Nissan Silvia (S13)
Kazuya Matsukawa	1	2007	D1 Street Legal	Nissan 180SX (RPS13)
Naoto Suenaga	1	2008	D1 Street Legal	Nissan Silvia (S13)
Seimi Tanaka	1	2011	D1 Street Legal	Nissan Silvia (S13)
Masashi Yokoi	1	2012	D1 Street Legal	Nissan Silvia (S14)
Katsuhiro Ueo	1	2016	D1 Street Legal	Nissan Silvia (S15)
Junya Ishikawa	1	2018	D1 Lights	Nissan Silvia (S14)
Hiroki Vito	1	2021	D1 Lights	Nissan Silvia (S13)
Yuki Tano	1	2022	D1 Lights	Nissan Silvia (S15)
Hisato Yonai	1	2023	D1 Lights	Nissan 180SX (RPS13)
Kenshiro Wada	1	2024	D1 Lights	Nissan 180SX (RPS13)
Genki Mogami	1	2025	D1 Lights	Nissan 180SX (RPS13)

== All Star winners (non championship) ==
Year	Event title	Driver	Team	Car
2004	USA vs Japan	Nobushige Kumakubo	Team Orange, ADVAN	Nissan Silvia S15
2005	USA vs Japan	Vaughn Gittin Jr.	Falken, Drift Alliance	Ford Mustang GT
2006	World All Star	Ken Nomura	Blitz, URAS, Direzza	Nissan Skyline ER34
2007	All Star Duel	Vaughn Gittin Jr.	Falken, Drift Alliance	Ford Mustang GT
2015	World Champions	Masato Kawabata	Team Toyo Tires Drift Trust Racing	Nissan GT-R

== Tires ==
Several tire manufacturers have sponsored drivers over the history of D1GP competition.

Tire Brand	Years active
(Indonesia) ATR Radial	(–2016)
(China) Antares	(2024–)
(Japan) Bridgestone	(2001–?–2010, 2014–2016)
(China) Celimo	(2024–)
(United Kingdom) Davanti	(2024–)
(United Kingdom) Dunlop	(2001–?–2018, 2022–)
(Japan) Falken	(2001–?–2008, 2012–2016)
(Chinese Taipei) Federal	(2011–2016, 2022–)
(China) Goodride	(–2018)
(United States) Goodyear	(2001–?–2018)
(China) Habilead	(2022–)
(South Korea) Hankook	(2011–?)
(Thailand) Harson	(2026-)
(Chinese Taipei) Kenda	(2016–2017, 2022–)
(China) Linglong	(2019–2021)
(United Kingdom) MaxTrek	(2024–)
(Chinese Taipei) Nankang	(2017–)
(China) Rydanz	(2019–2020)
(China) Sailun	(2020–2021, 2023–)
(Japan) Shibatire	(2022–)
(Japan) Toyo	(2001–)
(Japan) TRI-ACE	(2018–2019, 2022–)
(Japan) Valino	(2019–)
(China) Vitour	(2021–2022)
(China) Wanli Tires	(2016–2017)
(China) Westlake	(?)
(Japan) Yokohama	(2001–?–2016, 2022–)
(Japan) Zeknova	(2023–)
(Japan) Zenew	(2024–)
(Japan) Zestino	(2015–2018, 2022–)
(Japan) 5FIVEX	(2019)

== Statistics ==
- Youngest Driver to compete — Ken Gushi, age 16, 2004 Round 1.
- Youngest Driver to enter Final — Ryuu Nakamura, age 19yrs 3mths, 2025 Round 8.
- Youngest Driver to win (D1GP) — Conor Shanahan, age 23yrs, 5mths, 2026 Round 10.
- Youngest Driver to win (D1 Lights) — Ryuu Nakamura, age 18yrs 2mths, 2024 Round 7.
- Youngest Championship Winner — Youichi Imamura, age 27yrs 5mths, 2003 Season.
- Oldest Driver to enter Best 16 (Non-Championship) — Rod Millen, age 55, 2005 D1 USA vs Japan Allstar Exhibition.
- Oldest Driver to compete (D1SL) — Daijiro Inada, age 59, 2006 Round 2.
- Oldest Driver to win (D1GP) — Hideyuki Fujino 51yrs 10mths, 2026 Round 2.
- Oldest Driver to win (D1SL) — Kazuyoshi Okamura, age 47, 2006 Round 5.
- Oldest Championship Winner — Hideyuki Fujino, age 51yrs 4mths, 2025 Season.
- Best finishing position for a female driver — Shiina Tamaki, 4th place, 2026 Round 1.
- Most Season, Rounds entered — Takahiro Ueno, 26 season, 199 round.
- Most Wins in a single D1GP season — 5 wins, Daigo Saito, 2015 Season; Masanori Kohashi, 2020 Season; Masashi Yokoi 2026 Season.
- Most Wins in a single D1 Street Legal season — 5 wins, Naoto Suenaga, 2008 Season
- Most Wins in a single D1 Lights season — 4 wins, Kojiro Mekuwa, 2020 Season.
- Most Consecutive wins — 5 wins, Daigo Saito, 2015 Round 5 - 2016 Round 3
- Most Consecutive wins in a single season — 4 wins, Masashi Yokoi, 2026 Season
- Most Tanso Solo run in a single Season — 6 wins, Masato Kawabata, 2018 Season.
- Most Points in a single Season — 206pts, Naoki Nakamura, 2021 Season.
- Most Championship Wins — 4 wins, Youichi Imamura (2003, 2009–2011)
- Most Consecutive Championship win — 3, Youichi Imamura 2009-2011
- Narrowest title margin — 1pt; Yasuyuki Kazama (97pts) over Masao Suenaga (96pts), 2005 Season and Nobushige Kumakubo (110 pts) over Ken Nomura (109 pts), 2006 Season; Masato Kawabata (100pts) over Nobushige Kumakubo (99pts), 2007 Season, Hideyuki Fujino (170pts) over Koudai Sobagiri (169pts), 2025 Season.
- Widest title margin — 45pts; Masanori Kohashi (174pts) over Masashi Yokoi (129pts), 2020 Season.
- Highest number of entries – 124 (Rd 6, 2005).
- Lowest number of entries – 25 (Rd 5, 2001).

=== All-Time winners list ===
excludes non-championship, D1SL & non-Japanese National events

==== Driver ====
===== Drivers all-time winning table (Tsuiso) =====
As of 2026 D1GP round 10

Rank	Driver	Car(s)	Total
1	**Daigo Saito**	Toyota Mark II (JZX100), Toyota Chaser (JZX100), Chevrolet Corvette C6 (X245A), Toyota GR Supra (J29/DB)	20*
2	**Masato Kawabata**	Nissan Silvia (S15), Nissan 180SX (RPS13), Nissan GT-R (R35), Toyota GR Supra (J29/DB), Toyota GR86 (ZN8)	19
3	**Masashi Yokoi**	Nissan Silvia (S15), Nissan Silvia (S14)	17
4	Youichi Imamura	Toyota Sprinter Trueno (AE86), Mazda RX-7 (FD3S), Nissan Silvia (S15)	15
5	**Naoki Nakamura**	Nissan Silvia (S15), Nissan Silvia (S13), Toyota GR86 (ZN8)	13
6	Masao Suenaga	Mazda RX-7 (FD3S), Nissan GT-R (R35), Nissan Silvia (S15)	12
7	Masanori Kohashi	Nissan Silvia (S15)	9
8	**Hideyuki Fujino**	Nissan 180SX (RPS13), Toyota GR86 (ZN8)	8
9	Nobushige Kumakubo	Nissan Silvia (S15), Subaru Impreza (GDB), Mitsubishi Lancer Evolution IX (CT9A), Nissan Laurel (C33)	7
9	Yasuyuki Kazama	Nissan Silvia (S15)	7
11	**Koudai Sobagiri**	Infiniti Q60 (V37), Toyota GR86 (ZN8)	6
12	**Katsuhiro Ueo**	Toyota Sprinter Trueno (AE85), Nissan Silvia (S15)	5
12	**Yukio Matsui**	Mazda RX-7 (FD3S)	5
12	Ken Nomura	Nissan Skyline (ER34)	5
12	Nobuteru Taniguchi	Nissan Silvia (S15)	5
12	Tetsuya Hibino	Toyota Sprinter Trueno (AE85), Toyota GT86 (ZN6), Toyota GR86 (ZN8)	5*
17	**Kojiro Mekuwa**	Nissan 180SX (RPS13), BMW 3-Series (E92)	4
17	Naoto Suenaga	Mitsubishi Lancer Evolution X (CZ4A), Nissan Silvia (S15)	4
19	Yoshinori Koguchi	Nissan 180SX (RPS13), Nissan Silvia (S15)	3
19	**Hokuto Matsuyama**	Toyota GR Supra (J29/DB), Toyota GR Corolla	3
21	**Akinori Utsumi**	Nissan Silvia (S15)	2
21	Tomohiro Murayama	Nissan Silvia (S14)	2
21	Manabu Orido	Toyota Supra (JZA80), Toyota GT86 (ZN6)	2
21	Kuniaki Takahashi	Toyota Mark X (GRX130)	2
21	**Tsuyoshi Tezuka**	Nissan Skyline GT-R (BNR32)	2
21	Kazuhiro Tanaka	Nissan Silvia (S15), Subaru Impreza (GDB)	2
26	Conor Shanahan	Toyota GR Corolla	1
26	**Yuki Tano**	Toyota GR86 (ZN8)	1
26	**Maopo Yamanaka**	Toyota GR Supra (J29/DB)	1
26	Shingo Hatanaka	Toyota Chaser (JZX100)	1
26	Kenji Takayama	Lexus GS (GRS191)	1
26	**Kazuya Matsukawa**	Toyota Sprinter Trueno (AE85)	1
26	Masayoshi Tokita	Toyota Crown (GRS180)	1
26	Atsushi Kuroi	Nissan Silvia (S13)	1
26	Hideo Hiraoka	Nissan Silvia (S15)	1
26	Toshiki Yoshioka	Toyota Sprinter Trueno (AE85)	1
26	Ryuji Miki	Nissan Silvia (S15)	1
26	Ken Maeda	Toyota Sprinter Trueno (AE86)	1
26	Kouichi Yamashita	Nissan Silvia (S15)	1
26	Masatoshi Asamoto	Mazda RX-7 (FD3S)	1
26	**Takahiro Ueno**	Toyota Soarer (JZZ30)	1
26	Mitsuru Haruguchi	Mazda RX-7 (FC3S)	1

===== Tanso all-time winning table (Awarded since 2011 season) =====
Rank	Driver	Car	Total
1	**Naoki Nakamura**	Nissan Silvia (S15), Nissan Silvia (S13), Toyota GR86 (ZN8)	16
2	**Hideyuki Fujino**	Nissan 180SX (RPS13), Toyota GR86 (ZN8)	14
3	**Masato Kawabata**	Nissan 180SX (RPS13), Nissan GT-R (R35), Toyota GR Supra (J29/DB)	13
4	**Koudai Sobagiri**	Infiniti Q60, Toyota GR86	12
4	**Daigo Saito**	Toyota Mark II (JZX100), Toyota Chaser (JZX100), Chevrolet Corvette C6 (X245A), Toyota GR Supra (J29/DB)	10
6	**Masashi Yokoi**	Nissan Silvia (S15), Nissan Silvia (S14)	9
7	**Hokuto Matsuyama**	Toyota GR Supra (J29/DB), Toyota GR Corolla	8
8	**Seimi Tanaka**	Nissan Silvia (S15)	6
8	Tetsuya Hibino	Toyota Sprinter Trueno (AE85), Toyota Supra (JZA80), Honda S2000 (AP1), Nissan Silvia (S14)	6
10	**Yukio Matsui**	Nissan Silvia (S15), Mazda RX-7 (FD3S)	4
11	**Teruyoshi Iwai**	Daihatsu Charmant (A35), Mazda Roadster (NA6CE)	3
11	Akinori Utsumi	Nissan Silvia (S15)	3
13	**Mitsuru Murakami**	Toyota GR86 (ZN8)	2
13	Kuniaki Takahashi	Toyota Mark X (GRX130)	2
13	Manabu Orido	Toyota Supra (JZA80), Toyota GT86 (ZN6)	2
13	Youichi Imamura	Nissan Silvia (S15), Toyota GT86 (ZN6)	2
13	Naoto Suenaga	Nissan Silvia (S15)	2
18	**Tsuyoshi Tezuka**	Nissan Skyline GT-R (BNR34)	1
18	**Kazuya Matsukawa**	Toyota Sprinter Trueno (AE85)	1
18	**Masao Suenaga**	Mazda RX-7 (FD3S)	1
18	**Kojiro Mekuwa**	Nissan 180SX (RPS13)	1
18	**Junya Ishikawa**	Toyota GR86 (ZN8)	1
18	**Takahiro Ueno**	Lexus RC (XC10)	1
18	**Lattapon Keawchin**	BMW 2 Series (F22)	1
18	**Koji Tada**	Toyota GR86 (ZN8)	1
18	Masanori Kohashi	Nissan Silvia (S15)	1
18	Akira Hirajima	Nissan Silvia (S15)	1
18	Yoshinori Koguchi	Toyota GT86 (ZN6)	1
18	Shinji Sagisaka	Toyota Altezza (SXE10)	1
18	Yusuke Kitaoka	Toyota Mark II (JZX100)	1

Bold : Active Drivers

Italics : Active in other series

==== Car all-time winning table ====
(Tsuiso = dual run; tanso = solo run)

Rank	Car	Total	Season										2011			2012		2013		2014		2015		2016		2017		2018		2019		2020		2021		2022		2023		2024		2025		2026	
Rank	Car	Total	2001	2002	2003	2004	2005	2006	2007	2008	2009	2010	Overall	Tsuiso	Tanso	Tsuiso	Tanso	Tsuiso	Tanso	Tsuiso	Tanso	Tsuiso	Tanso	Tsuiso	Tanso	Tsuiso	Tanso	Tsuiso	Tanso	Tsuiso	Tanso	Tsuiso	Tanso	Tsuiso	Tanso	Tsuiso	Tanso	Tsuiso	Tanso	Tsuiso	Tanso	Tsuiso	Tanso	Tsuiso	Tanso
1	Nissan Silvia S15	84	2	2	4	4	3	4	2	2	1	3	2	2	1	0	2	2	2	1	2	0	2	0	1	2	1	5	1	5	2	7	4	8	6	3	1	4	2	0	0	0	1	0	0
2	Toyota GR86 ZN8	46	0	0	0	0	0	0	0	0	0	0	0	0	0	0	0	0	0	0	0	0	0	0	0	0	0	0	0	0	0	0	0	0	0	2	1	4	5	4	5	6	6	4	9
3	Nissan 180SX RPS13	27	0	0	0	0	0	0	0	1	2	1	2	2	1	1	1	2	1	0	0	0	0	0	0	2	3	1	1	0	2	0	2	0	0	1	1	0	0	0	0	0	0	0	0
4	Mazda RX-7 FD3S	26	0	3	2	2	2	0	2	1	2	1	0	0	0	0	1	0	0	2	1	0	0	0	1	0	1	1	0	2	0	0	0	1	1	0	0	0	0	0	0	0	0	0	0
5	Toyota Mark II JZX100	20	0	0	0	0	0	0	0	1	1	0	2	1	2	2	1	1	2	0	0	3	0	2	1	0	0	0	0	0	1	0	0	0	0	0	0	0	0	0	0	0	0	0	0
6	Toyota Supra DB	17	0	0	0	0	0	0	0	0	0	0	0	0	0	0	0	0	0	0	0	0	0	0	0	0	0	0	0	0	1	1	2	1	2	1	2	1	1	0	4	0	1	0	0
7	Nissan GT-R R35	13	0	0	0	0	0	0	0	0	0	0	0	0	0	0	0	0	0	0	1	2	1	0	1	2	0	0	6	0	0	0	0	0	0	0	0	0	0	0	0	0	0	0	0
8	Toyota Sprinter AE86	10	1	2	1	0	2	0	0	0	1	1	0	0	2	0	0	0	0	0	0	0	0	0	0	0	0	0	0	0	0	0	0	0	0	0	0	0	0	0	0	0	0	0	0
9	Nissan Silvia PS13	9	0	0	0	0	0	0	1	0	0	0	0	0	0	0	0	0	0	0	0	0	0	0	0	0	0	0	0	0	0	0	0	0	0	2	1	0	0	4	1	0	0	0	0
9	Nissan Silvia S14	9	0	0	0	0	0	0	0	0	0	0	0	0	0	0	0	0	0	0	0	0	0	2	0	0	0	0	0	0	1	0	0	0	0	0	0	0	0	0	0	0	0	5	1
11	Infiniti Q60	7	0	0	0	0	0	0	0	0	0	0	0	0	0	0	0	0	0	0	0	0	0	0	0	0	0	0	0	0	0	0	0	0	1	0	3	1	2	0	0	0	0	0	0
12	Toyota Chaser JZX100	6	0	0	0	0	0	0	0	0	0	0	0	0	0	0	0	0	0	0	0	0	0	3	1	0	0	1	0	0	0	0	0	0	0	0	0	0	0	0	0	0	0	0	0
13	Nissan Skyline ER34	5	0	0	0	1	0	2	1	0	1	0	0	0	0	0	0	0	0	0	0	0	0	0	0	0	0	0	0	0	0	0	0	0	0	0	0	0	0	0	0	0	0	0	0
13	Toyota 86 ZN6	5	0	0	0	0	0	0	0	0	0	0	0	0	0	0	0	1	0	0	1	1	2	0	0	0	0	0	0	0	0	0	0	0	0	0	0	0	0	0	0	0	0	0	0
15	Toyota Mark X GRX130	4	0	0	0	0	0	0	0	0	0	0	0	0	1	1	1	0	0	1	0	0	0	0	0	0	0	0	0	0	0	0	0	0	0	0	0	0	0	0	0	0	0	0	0
15	Toyota GR Corolla E210	4	0	0	0	0	0	0	0	0	0	0	0	0	0	0	0	0	0	0	0	0	0	0	0	0	0	0	0	0	0	0	0	0	0	0	0	0	0	1	0	1	1	1	0
17	Subaru Impreza GDB	3	0	0	0	0	0	2	1	0	0	0	0	0	0	0	0	0	0	0	0	0	0	0	0	0	0	0	0	0	0	0	0	0	0	0	0	0	0	0	0	0	0	0	0
17	Nissan Laurel C33	3	0	0	0	0	0	0	0	0	0	0	1	1	0	1	0	0	0	0	0	0	0	0	0	0	0	0	0	0	0	0	0	0	0	0	0	0	0	0	0	0	0	0	0
17	BMW 3 Series E92	3	0	0	0	0	0	0	0	0	0	0	0	0	0	0	0	0	0	0	0	0	0	0	0	0	0	0	0	0	0	0	0	0	0	0	0	0	0	0	0	3	0	0	0
20	Nissan Skyline GT-R BNR32	2	0	0	0	0	0	0	0	1	1	0	0	0	0	0	0	0	0	0	0	0	0	0	0	0	0	0	0	0	0	0	0	0	0	0	0	0	0	0	0	0	0	0	0
20	Toyota Supra JZA80	2	0	0	0	0	0	0	0	0	0	0	1	0	1	0	0	0	0	0	0	0	0	0	0	0	0	0	0	0	0	0	0	0	0	0	0	0	0	0	0	0	0	0	0
20	Mitsubishi Lancer Evolution X CZ4A	2	0	0	0	0	0	0	0	0	0	0	0	0	0	2	0	0	0	0	0	0	0	0	0	0	0	0	0	0	0	0	0	0	0	0	0	0	0	0	0	0	0	0	0
20	Toyota Sprinter AE85	2	0	0	0	0	0	0	0	0	0	0	0	0	0	0	0	0	0	1	1	0	0	0	0	0	0	0	0	0	0	0	0	0	0	0	0	0	0	0	0	0	0	0	0
20	Mazda Roadster NA6CE	2	0	0	0	0	0	0	0	0	0	0	0	0	0	0	0	0	0	0	0	0	0	0	2	0	0	0	0	0	0	0	0	0	0	0	0	0	0	0	0	0	0	0	0
20	Chevrolet Corvette X245A	2	0	0	0	0	0	0	0	0	0	0	0	0	0	0	0	0	0	0	0	0	0	0	0	1	1	0	0	0	0	0	0	0	0	0	0	0	0	0	0	0	0	0	0
26	Toyota Soarer JZZ30	1	1	0	0	0	0	0	0	0	0	0	0	0	0	0	0	0	0	0	0	0	0	0	0	0	0	0	0	0	0	0	0	0	0	0	0	0	0	0	0	0	0	0	0
26	Mazda RX-7 FC3S	1	1	0	0	0	0	0	0	0	0	0	0	0	0	0	0	0	0	0	0	0	0	0	0	0	0	0	0	0	0	0	0	0	0	0	0	0	0	0	0	0	0	0	0
26	Honda S2000 AP1	1	0	0	0	0	0	0	0	0	0	0	0	0	0	0	0	0	0	0	0	0	0	0	0	0	1	0	0	0	0	0	0	0	0	0	0	0	0	0	0	0	0	0	0
26	Mitsubishi Lancer Evolution IX CT9A	1	0	0	0	0	0	0	0	1	0	0	0	0	0	0	0	0	0	0	0	0	0	0	0	0	0	0	0	0	0	0	0	0	0	0	0	0	0	0	0	0	0	0	0
26	Toyota Crown GRS180	1	0	0	0	0	0	0	0	0	0	1	0	0	0	0	0	0	0	0	0	0	0	0	0	0	0	0	0	0	0	0	0	0	0	0	0	0	0	0	0	0	0	0	0
26	Lexus GS GRS191	1	0	0	0	0	0	0	0	0	0	0	0	0	0	0	0	0	0	1	0	0	0	0	0	0	0	0	0	0	0	0	0	0	0	0	0	0	0	0	0	0	0	0	0
26	Nissan Skyline GT-R BNR34	1	0	0	0	0	0	0	0	0	0	0	0	0	0	0	1	0	0	0	0	0	0	0	0	0	0	0	0	0	0	0	0	0	0	0	0	0	0	0	0	0	0	0	0
26	Daihatsu Charmant A35	1	0	0	0	0	0	0	0	0	0	0	0	0	0	0	0	0	1	0	0	0	0	0	0	0	0	0	0	0	0	0	0	0	0	0	0	0	0	0	0	0	0	0	0
26	Toyota Altezza SXE10	1	0	0	0	0	0	0	0	0	0	0	0	0	0	0	0	0	0	0	0	0	1	0	0	0	0	0	0	0	0	0	0	0	0	0	0	0	0	0	0	0	0	0	0
26	Lexus RC XC10	1	0	0	0	0	0	0	0	0	0	0	0	0	0	0	0	0	0	0	0	0	0	0	0	0	0	0	0	0	0	0	0	0	0	0	0	0	0	1	0	0	0	0	0
26	BMW 2 Series F22	1	0	0	0	0	0	0	0	0	0	0	0	0	0	0	0	0	0	0	0	0	0	0	0	0	0	0	0	0	0	0	0	0	0	0	0	0	0	0	0	0	1	0	0

== Gallery ==
Masato Kawabata's, Nissan Silvia S15

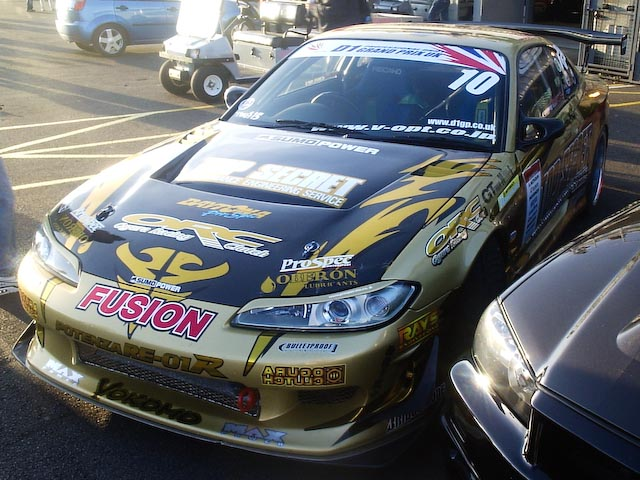
Ryuji Miki's, Nissan Silvia S15

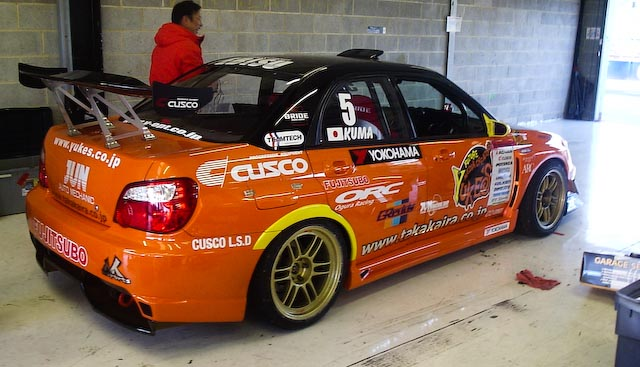
Nobushige Kumakubo's Subaru Impreza GDB

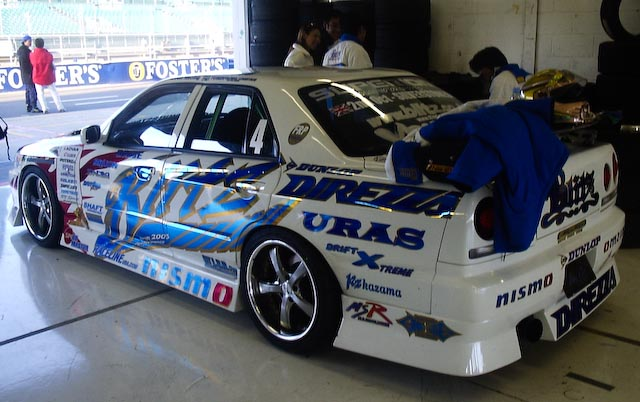
Ken Nomura's Nissan Skyline ER34

Masao Suenaga's RE Amemiya Mazda RX-7

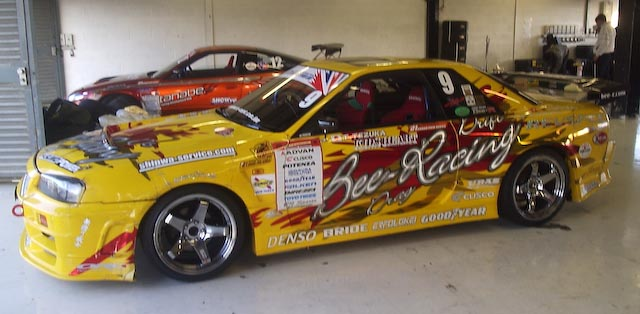
Tsuyoshi Tezuka's Nissan Skyline BNR32 (B324R)

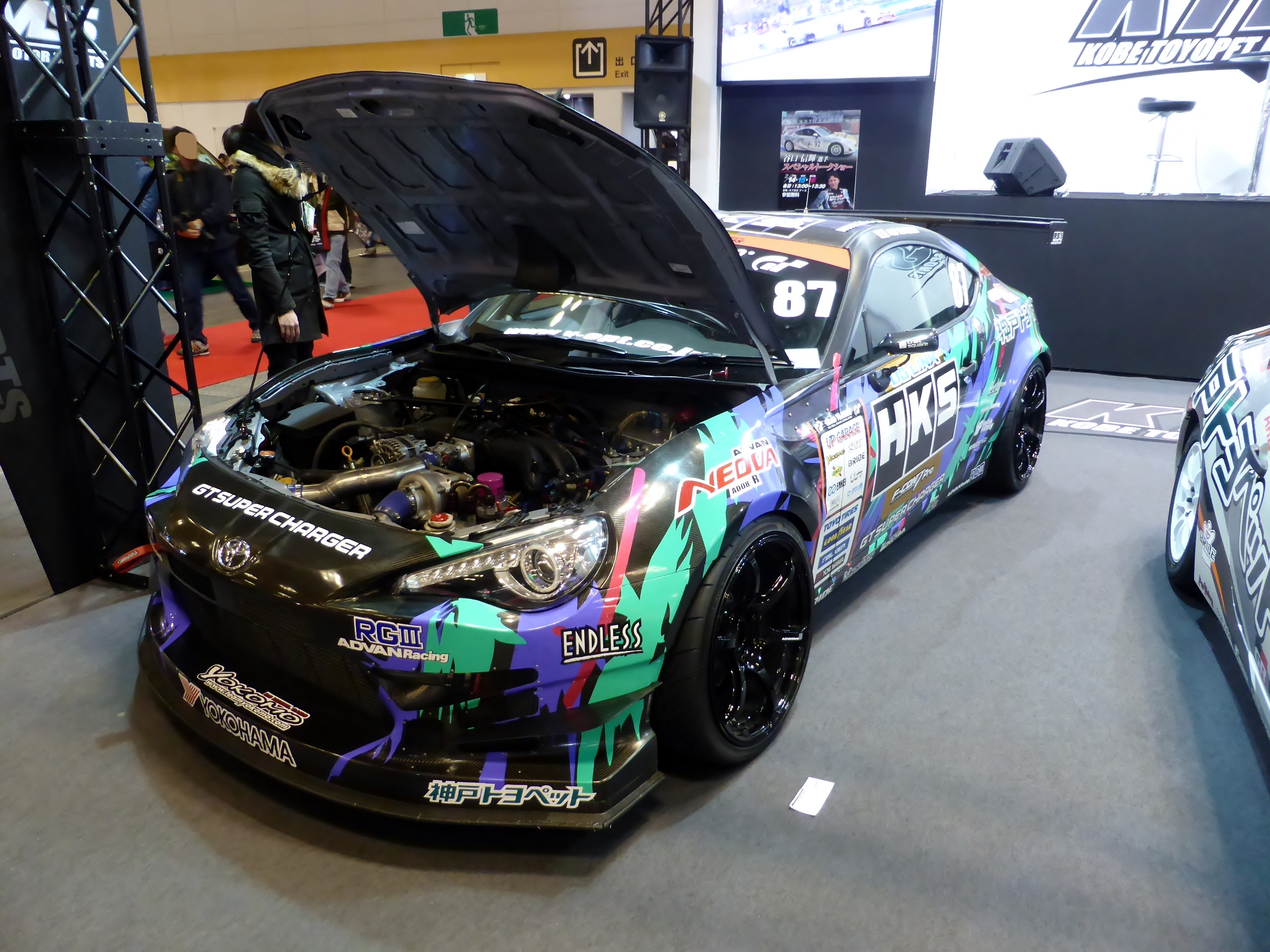
Nobuteru Taniguchi's HKS built Toyota GT86

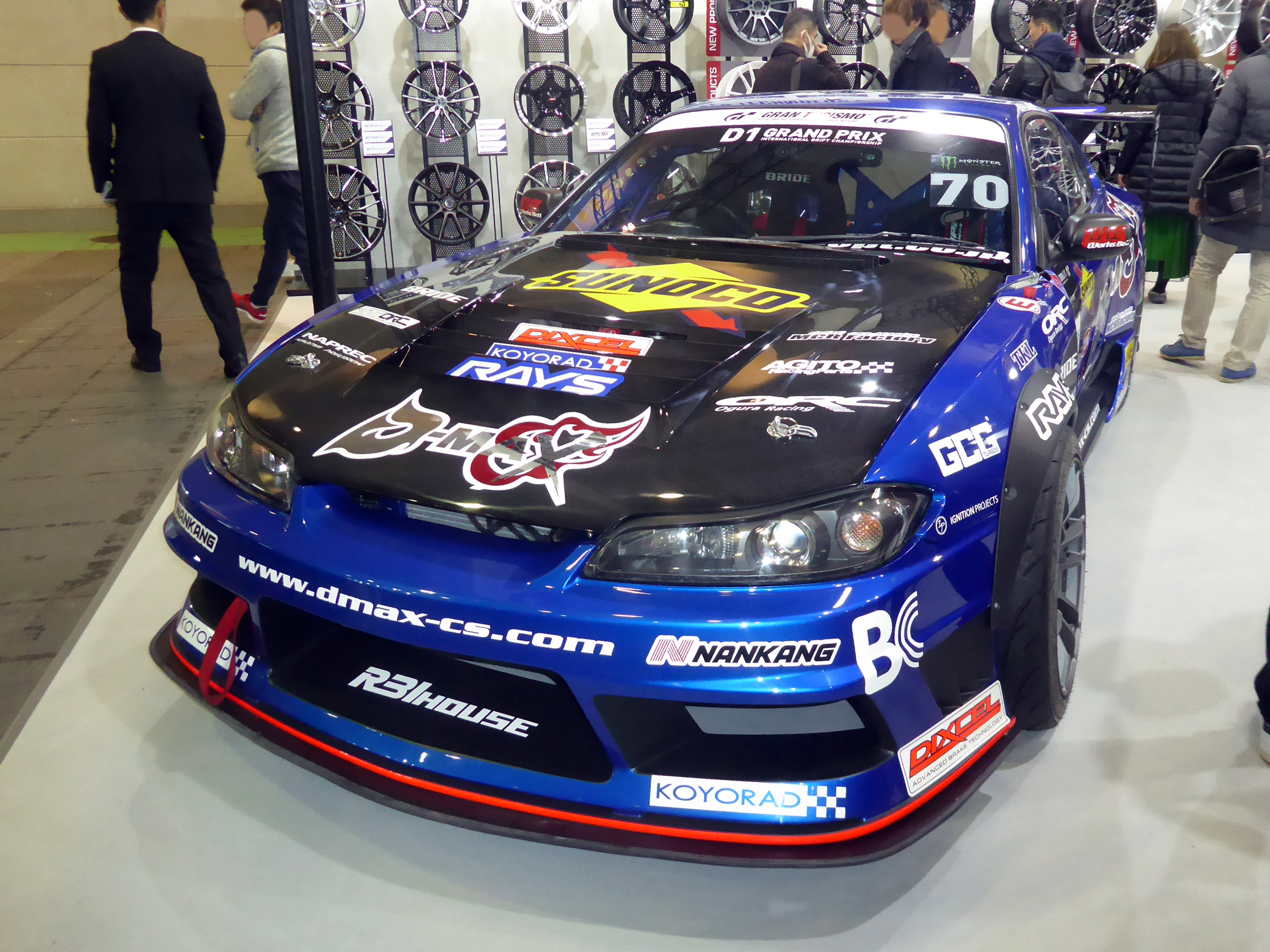
Masashi Yokoi's Nissan Silvia S15

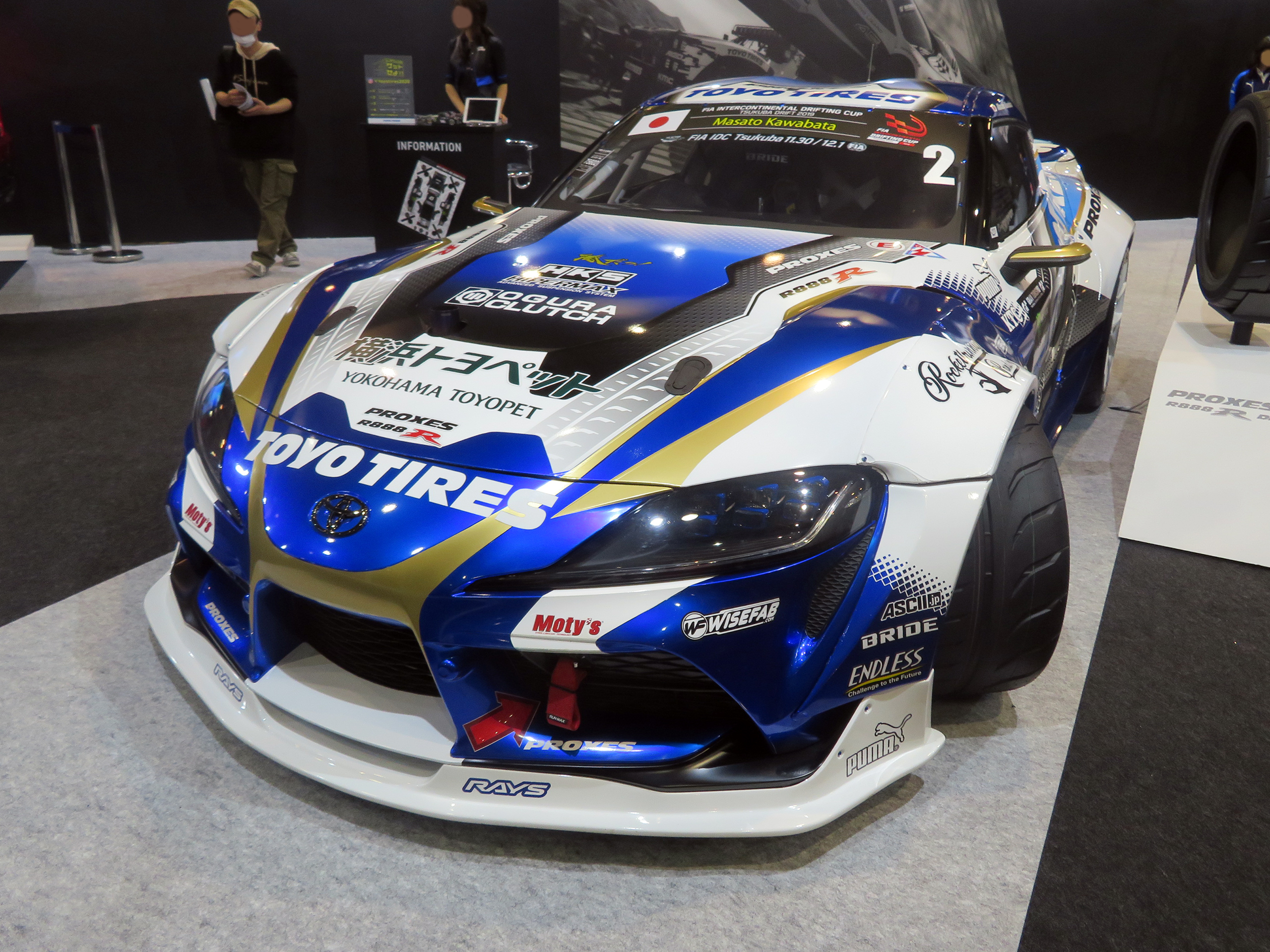
Masato Kawabata's Toyota GR Supra

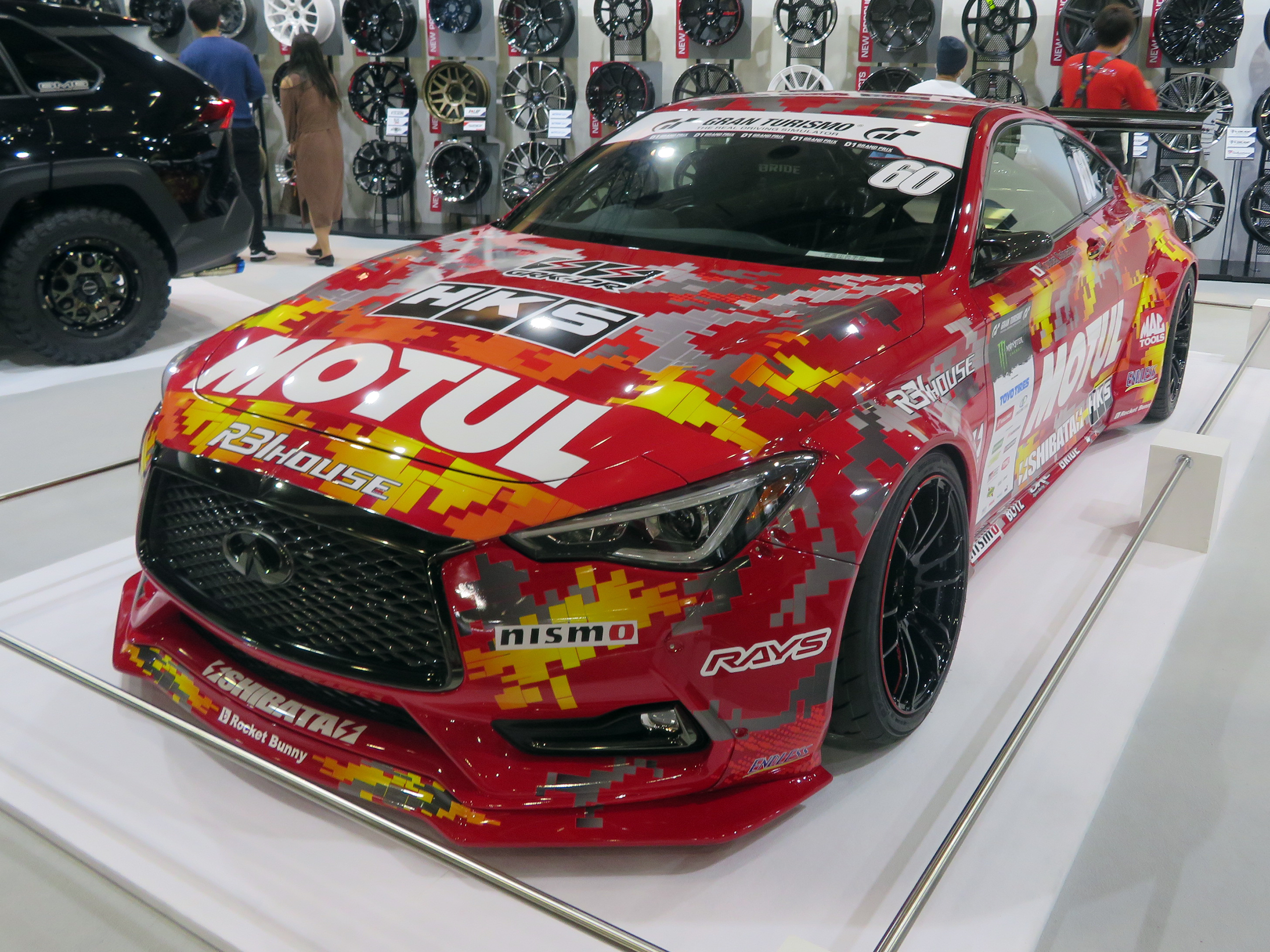
Koudai Sobagiri's Infiniti Q60

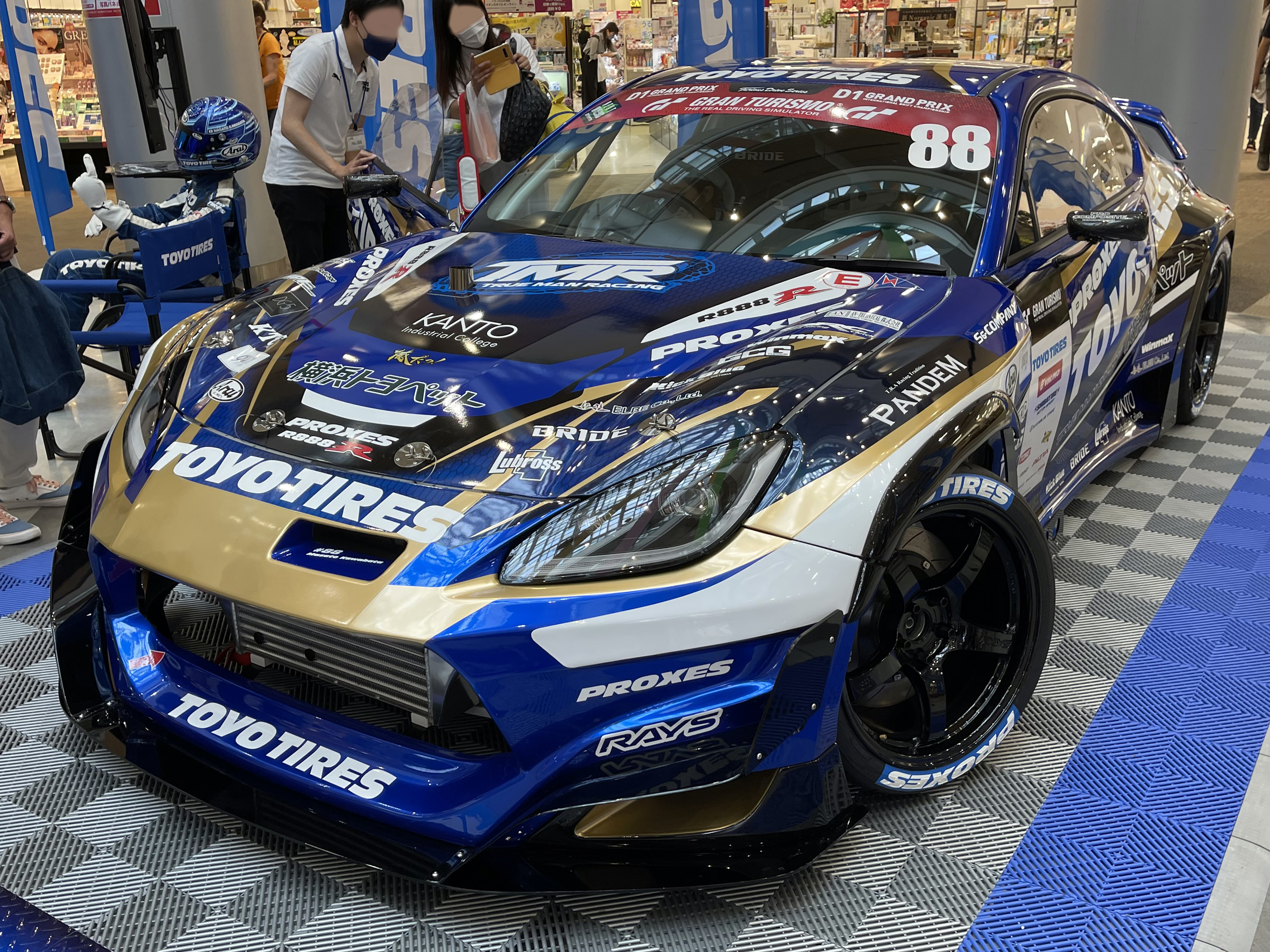
Masato Kawabata's Toyota GR86

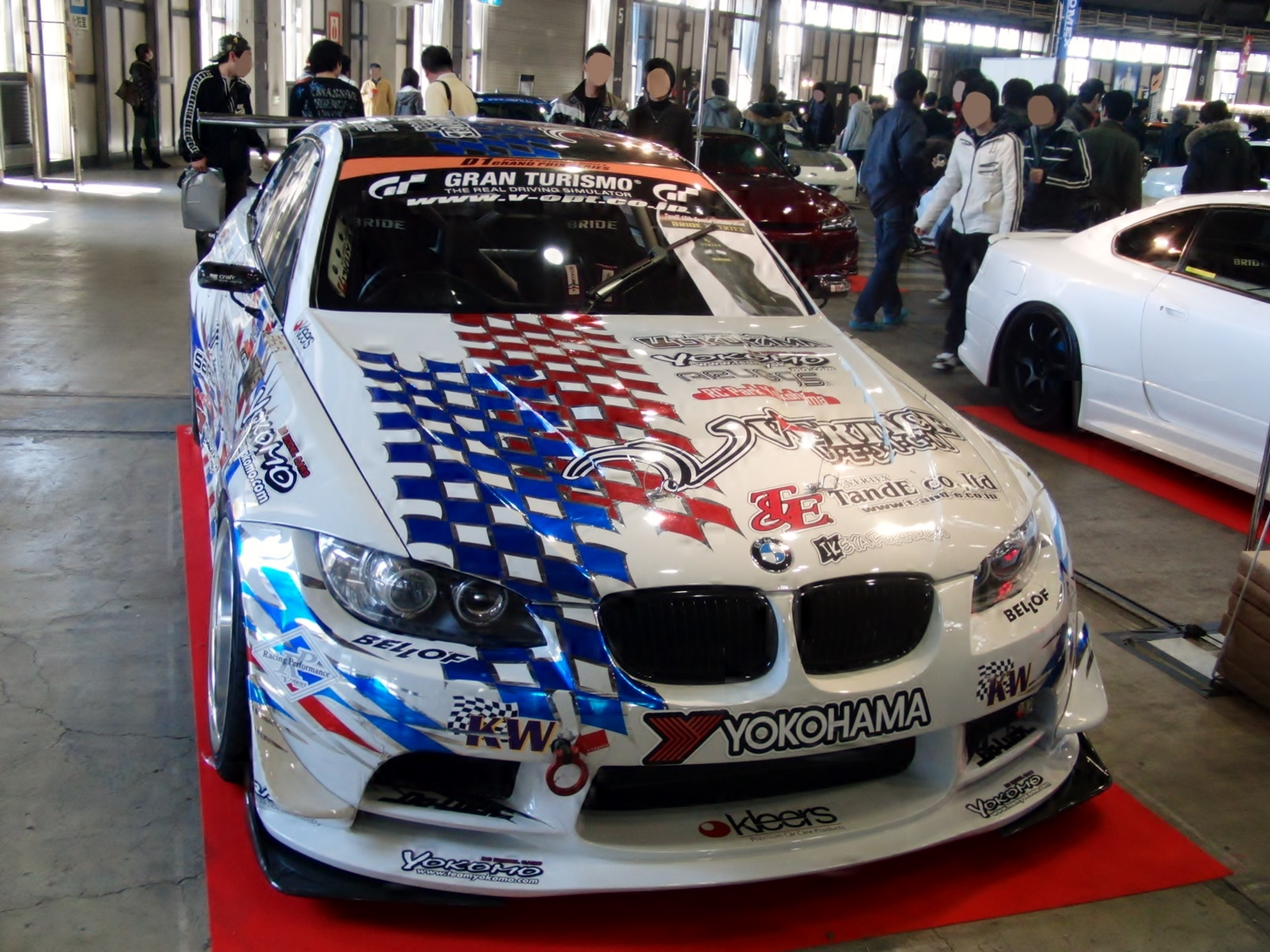
Takahiro Ueno's BMW 3 Series (E90)

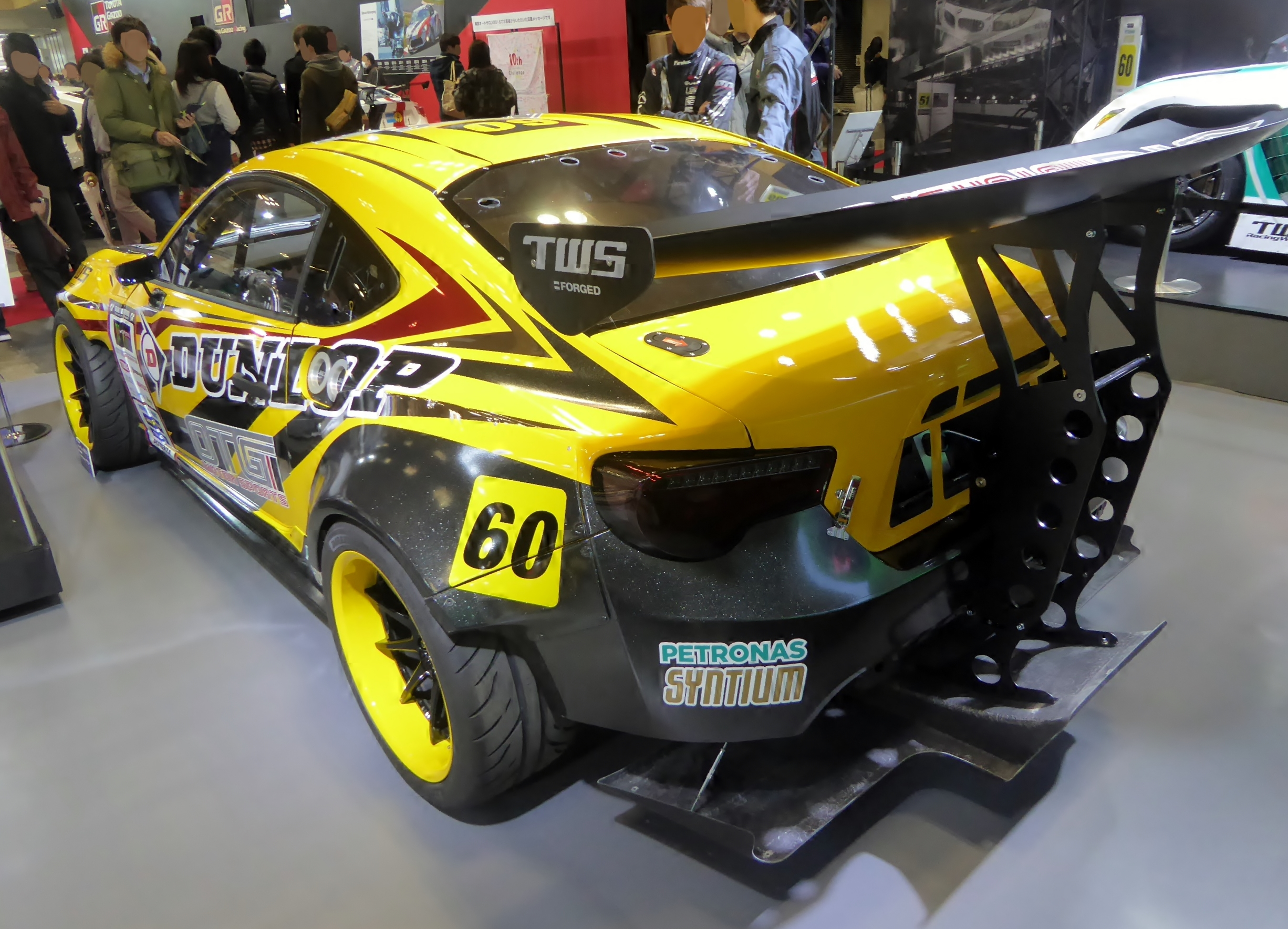
Yoichi Imamura's Toyota GT86

== See also ==
- Formula D
- Drift Masters
- Drift Allstars
- British Drift Championship
- Russian Drift Series
