= 2016 D1 Grand Prix series =

Motor racing competition

Seasons
- ← 2015 2017 →

The 2016 D1 Grand Prix series is the sixteenth season for the D1 Grand Prix series and the eleventh for the D1 Street Legal spinoff series. The season began on March 26 at Odaiba Tokyo Street Course for the D1GP and ended on October 23 at the same course with Daigo Saito winning his second Championship and began on April 16 for D1SL at Bihoku Highland Circuit. and ended on November 20 at Nikko Circuit with Katsuhiro Ueo winning his first D1SL Championship by cancellation, due to a fatal incident that happened during morning practice.

== Schedule ==
Round		Venue	Location	Date	Winner	Car
D1GP	D1SL	Venue	Location	Date	Winner	Car
1		(Tokyo) Odaiba	Tokyo Prefecture	March 26–27	Daigo Saito	Toyota JZX100
	1	(Hiroshima Prefecture) Bihoku Highland Circuit	Hiroshima Prefecture	April 16–17	Katsuhiro Ueo	Nissan Silvia S15
2		(Shizuoka Prefecture) Fuji Speedway	Shizuoka Prefecture	April 23–24	Daigo Saito	Toyota JZX100
	2	(Shizuoka Prefecture) Ebisu Circuit	Fukushima Prefecture	May 28–29	Katsuhiro Ueo	Nissan Silvia S15
3		(Ibaraki Prefecture) Tsukuba Circuit	Ibaraki Prefecture	June 25	Daigo Saito	Toyota JZX100
4		(Ibaraki Prefecture) Tsukuba Circuit	Ibaraki Prefecture	June 26	Tomohiro Murayama	Nissan S14
	3	(Nara Prefecture) Meihan Sportsland	Nara Prefecture	July 9–10	Junya Ishikawa	Nissan S14
5		(Fukushima Prefecture) Ebisu Circuit	Fukushima Prefecture	August 6	Daigo Saito	Toyota JZX100
6		(Fukushima Prefecture) Ebisu Circuit	Fukushima Prefecture	August 7	Tomohiro Murayama	Nissan S14
	4	(Niigata Prefecture) Maze Sea Circuit	Niigata Prefecture	August 20–21	Katsuhiro Ueo	Nissan Silvia S15
	5	(Ehime Prefecture) Seto Inland Sea Circuit	Ehime Prefecture	October 15–16	Takatoshi Imamaeda	Nissan Silvia S14
7		(Tokyo) Odaiba	Tokyo Prefecture	October 22–23	Daigo Saito	Toyota JZX100
	6	(Tochigi Prefecture) Nikko Circuit	Tochigi Prefecture	November 19–20	Event Cancelled	Event Cancelled

== Drivers' rankings ==
=== D1GP ===
Pos.	Driver	Car	Rd.1	Rd.2	Rd.3	Rd.4	Rd.5	Rd.6	Rd.7	Total
1	(Japan) Daigo Saito	Toyota JZX100	30	30	33	22	30		30	172
2	(Japan) Masato Kawabata	Nissan R35	25	25	22	14		22	25	133
3	(Japan) Hideyuki Fujino	Nissan RPS13	22	11	12		17	25	20	107
4	(Japan) Masashi Yokoi	Nissan S15	7	16	25		22	17	12	99
5	(Japan) Tomohiro Murayama	Nissan S14	5		10	30	7	30	9	91
6	(Japan) Tetsuya Hibino	Toyota JZA80	17		20	11	1	7	14	70
7	(Japan) Teruyoshi Iwai	Mazda NA6CE	1		17	12	11	9	17	67
8	(Japan) Akira Hirajima	Nissan S15	1		9	20	8	1	22	61
9	(Japan) Naoto Suenaga	Nissan S15	10	12			15	14	1	52
10	(Japan) Kunihiko Teramachi	Nissan S15	6	17		5	16	6	1	51
11	(Japan) Seimi Tanaka	Nissan S15			11	7		15	16	49
11	(Japan) Youichi Imamura	Toyota ZN6	1	20		17	1		10	49
13	(Japan) Hokuto Matsuyama	Toyota JZX100	1		15	25	1		5	47
13	(Japan) Yoshifumi Tadokoro	Toyota AE86		1	16	8	20	1	1	47
15	(Japan) Yukio Matsui	Mazda FD3S		8			25	12	1	46
16	(Japan) Akinori Utsumi	Nissan S15	8	14		1		5	15	43
17	(Japan) Tomokazu Hirota	Toyota JZX100	16	7	1	6	6		1	37
18	(Japan) Kazuya Bai	Nissan RPS13	9	15	1	1		1	6	33
19	(Japan) Shingo Hatanaka	Toyota JZX90		5		15		1	11	32
20	(Japan) Kenji Takayama	Lexus GRS191	11	1	1			8	8	29
20	(Japan) Yusuke Kitaoka	Toyota JZX100	12					16	1	29
22	(Japan) Yusuke Kusaba	Nissan PS13	20	1					7	28
23	(Japan) Kazuya Matsukawa	Toyota AE85		10			14		1	25
23	(Japan) Shinji Minowa	Toyota JZX90		22	1		1		1	25
25	(Thailand) Daychapon Toyingcharoen	Nissan Z33	1		8			11		20
26	(Japan) Yoshinori Koguchi	Toyota ZN6	15	1		1				17
27	(Japan) Ken Nomura	Nissan ER34		6		9	1			16
27	(Japan) Kazumi Takahashi	Toyota JZX100				16	0			16
27	(Japan) Kuniaki Takahashi	Toyota GRX130	14	1	1					16
30	(Japan) Takahiro Ueno	Toyota JZZ30			14					14
31	(Japan) Tetsuro Nakata	Toyota JZX100		1		1	9	1		12
31	(Japan) Koji Yamaguchi	Nissan S14			7					12
33	(Japan) Kenji Kiguchi	Nissan C33					10	1		11
33	(Japan) Masayoshi Tokita	Toyota ZN6		9	1			1		11
35	(Japan) Kenichi Nakamura	Toyota JZX110						10		10
36	(Japan) Ryuji Miki	Mazda FD3S			6					6
37	(Japan) Kazuya Taguchi	Nissan S15				1	1			2
37	(Japan) Jin Horino	Nissan RPS13		1		1				2
37	(Japan) Tadahiro Fukada	Toyota JZX100	1		1					2
40	(Japan) Ikuo Saito	Toyota JZX100						1		1
40	(Japan) Shinji Sagisaka	Toyota SXE10					1			1
40	(Japan) Yuji Saito	Nissan S15				1				1
40	(Japan) Shion Kono	Nissan RPS13	1							1
