= Naoki Nakamura (racing driver) =

Japanese drifting driver (born 1982)

Naoki Nakamura 中村 直樹
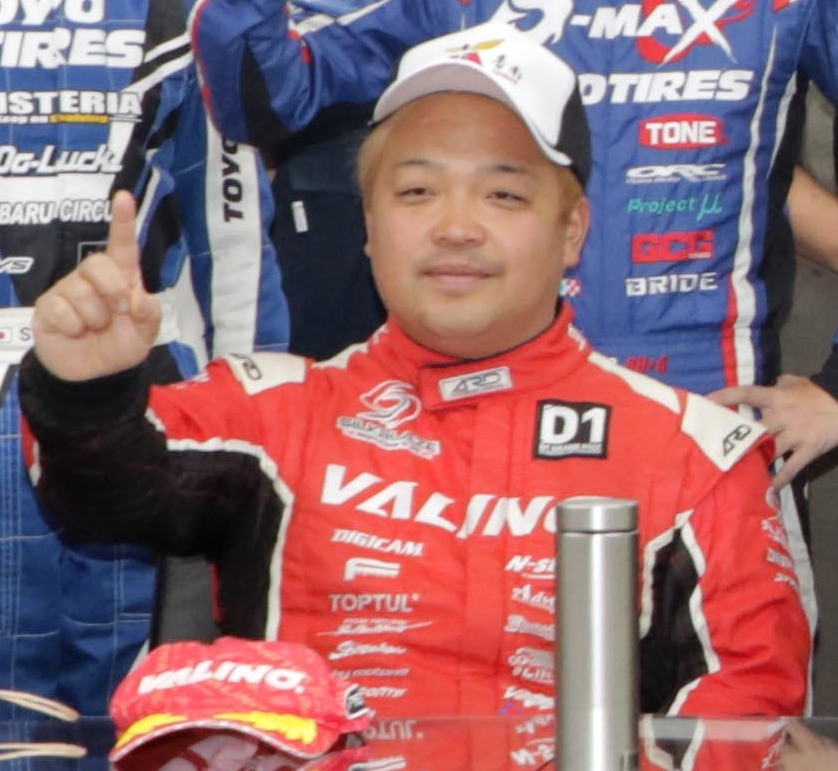
- Naoki Nakamura in 2024 Taiwan D1 Grand Prix
- Nationality: Japan
- Born: 14 March 1982 (age 44) Nara

D1 Grand Prix career
- Current team: Team Valino Works
- Car number: 99
- Former teams: Team Alive, D-MAX, Koyorad, TMAR x TEAM 紫
- Wins: 10
- Best finish: 1st in 2021, 2024

Previous series
- 2007-2010, 2013-2014 2011-2012 2018-2019 2018 2023,2025: D1 Street Legal The Drift Muscle; The Drift Kingdom; D1 Lights; Drift Masters

Championship titles
- 2009-2010, 2014 2011-2012 2019 2021,2024: D1 Street Legal; The Drift Muscle; The Drift Kingdom; D1 Grand Prix

Naoki Nakamura (中村 直樹, Nakamura Naoki, 14 March 1982, Nara) is a professional Japanese drifter. He competes in the D1GP and won the series in 2021 and 2024. He won its feeder series, D1 Street Legal, three times. He is known for his close tandem drifting.

== Career ==
Nakamura was initially part of a street racing team called "Burst". In 2005, he and the team competed in the Ikaten drift event, and his driving style put him the spotlight.

Nakamura started to compete in D1GP in 2005 without initial success. In 2006, he started to compete in D1 Street Legal and, improving with each round, got his first win in 2008 putting him second in the standings behind Naoto Suenaga.

In 2009, Nakamura competed against Jikuya Kiyofumi, Masashi Yokoi and Seimi Tanaka for the title, and managed to win three times in a row. He defended his title driving an S13 Silvia. Through his time in D1SL, he competed in D1GP with D-MAX and took fourth.

In January 2011, Nakamura was arrested for street drifting he had done in August 2010. He admitted that he wanted to practice. He lost his D1 License and was unable to compete in D1GP or D1 Street Legal despite his status as D1SL defending champion. He was able to compete in non D1 competitions such as The Drift Muscle, a new drifting competition founded by Keiichi Tsuchiya and Daijiro Inada after they stepped down from D1 management. He went on to win the inaugural season driving the same S15 he previously used in D1GP.

In 2012, Nakamura switched sponsors from D-MAX to Origin Labo. Continuing to compete in non D1 competitions, he started to use Federal tires and retained his Drift Muscle title. However, in 2013 he returned to D1 Street Legal driving an S13 Silvia again. He won the championship the following year, making him the most successful driver in the series' history. His championship allowed him to participate in the D1GP Exhibition match in Odaiba. Despite driving only a slightly modified version of his D1SL car, he beat many D1GP drivers, losing to Masato Kawabata in the end.

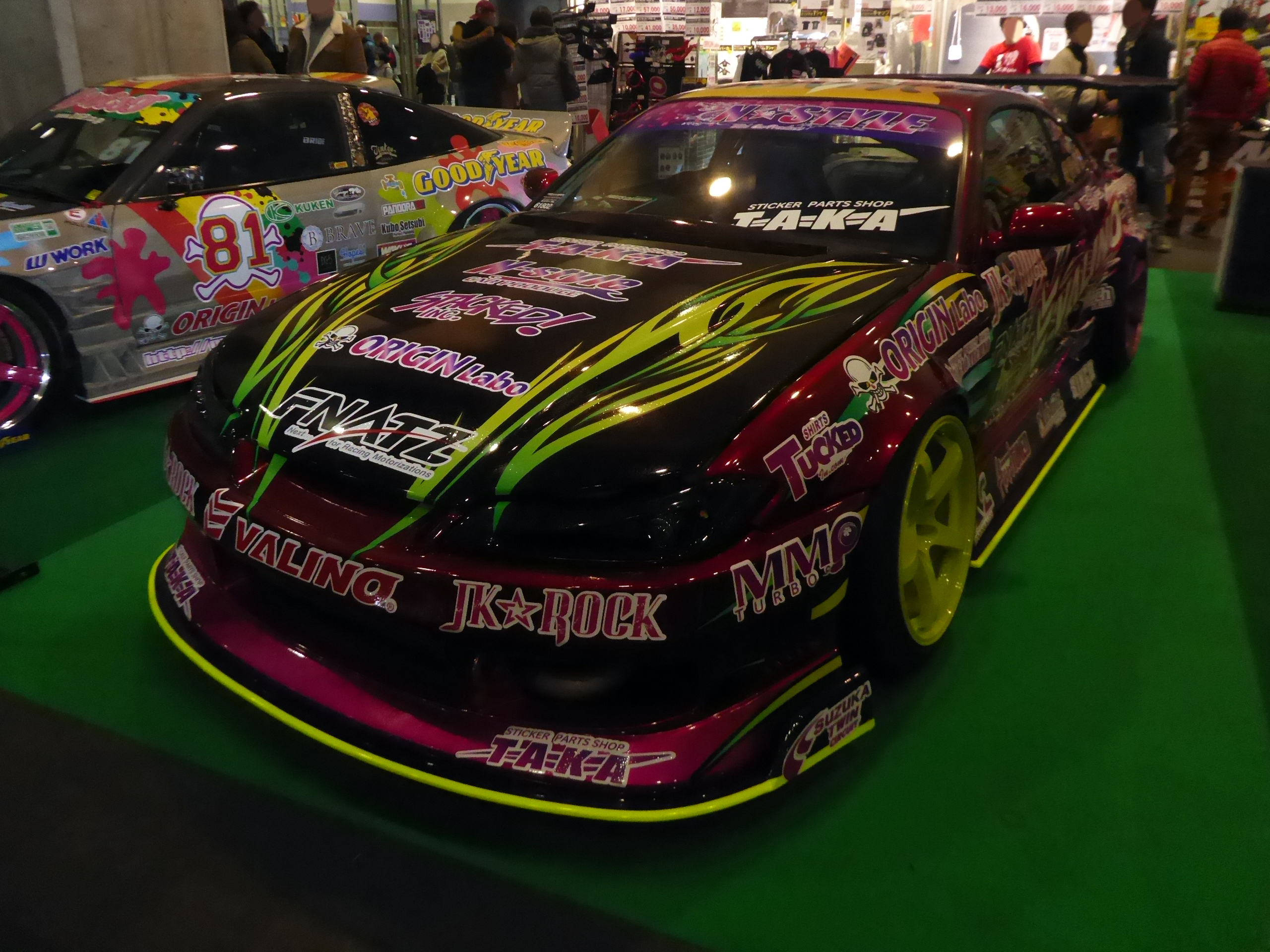
Nakamura's S15 Silvia at display on Osaka Auto Messe 2019

In 2018, Nakamura participated in D1 Lights, a series that replaced D1 Street Legal. Despite not competing full-time, he managed to get two wins and regain his D1GP license. He switched sponsors to Valino tires. He later competed in the drift class at World Time Attack Challenge in Australia, driving an S15 Silvia he prepared for D1GP the following year.

2019 marked Nakamura's return to D1GP after nearly a decade. He showed himself to be competitive, winning the Solo run on the third contest of the season, but recorded 34 penalty points in his battle against Hideyuki Fujino after missing all the zones in his lead run and pushing Fujino off the track. In the final round he grabbed his first D1GP and ended the season 6th in the standings. In 2020, he grabbed another win in round 7 of the season and finished fifth in the standings.

The 2021 season was Nakamura's best year as he grabbed four overall and solo run wins and sealed the championship in the penultimate round. He scored 204 points, the first to score more than 200 points in a season. His championship win made him the third person to win both D1GP and D1 Street Legal, after Katsuhiro Ueo and Masashi Yokoi.

In early 2022, Nakamura began collaborating with the new TMAR team and was to debut a V8 powered S13 built alongside fellow D1 driver Daigo Saito. The car was fitted with naturally aspirated LSX and was finished mere days before the opening round, but the V8 engine was blown during testing and Naoki had to reuse his S15 which shared the same fate as the S13 during practice. He scored no points in the opening round. The S13 returned for the second round, now with a Procharged LS3 previously powering Masanori Kohashi's car in 2018. Upgraded with the newly debuted car he won both rounds. The car is not as reliable as his previous car as he encountered several issue over the season and he ended up finishing third in championship losing the title to Masashi Yokoi. He also performed stunts for the film Alive Drift.

For 2023 season, Nakamura left TMAR and return as Valino's works driver and will debut a Toyota GR86 which makes it the first time he compete in a non Nissan S-Chassis car. On 25 December 2022 it is announced that he will bring his D1GP championship winning S15 to compete in Drift Masters European Championship as full time entry alongside his D1GP campaign. He finished his debut season at DMEC 8th in standings with 1 podium. In D1GP he win round 8 at Autopolis moving him to the series points leader, he didn't pass the Solo Run in the final round and beaten by Hideyuki Fujino to the title and dropping him to third below Hokuto Matsuyama.

Nakamura won his second title in 2024 despite only winning one round that season driving his V8 S13 once again. The title is closely contested between himself, Daigo Saito and Tetsuya Hibino where in final round, Saito fail to qualify and Hibino unable to overhaul the point deficit which allow Nakamura to win the title despite having engine issues during his Best 8 battle.

In 2025, Nakamura returned to compete in Drift Masters alongside his D1GP program this time with his GR86, where he achieve qualifying showdown win and a podium in season finale. In D1GP he claimed two wins and finished third place in final standings despite not attending the Tsukuba rounds. At Autopolis, he and his son Ryu become the first father and son to battle in D1GP round. The battle resulted with him winning the battle and the round itself. The two would battle once again at Odaiba this time in semifinal.

For 2026, Nakamura will compete in both D1GP and Formula Drift Japan driving a GR86 in both series. In D1GP, he is joined by Sayaka Shimoda in Valino works team.
