= Toyota Mark II =

Range of automobiles produced by Toyota (1968–2007)

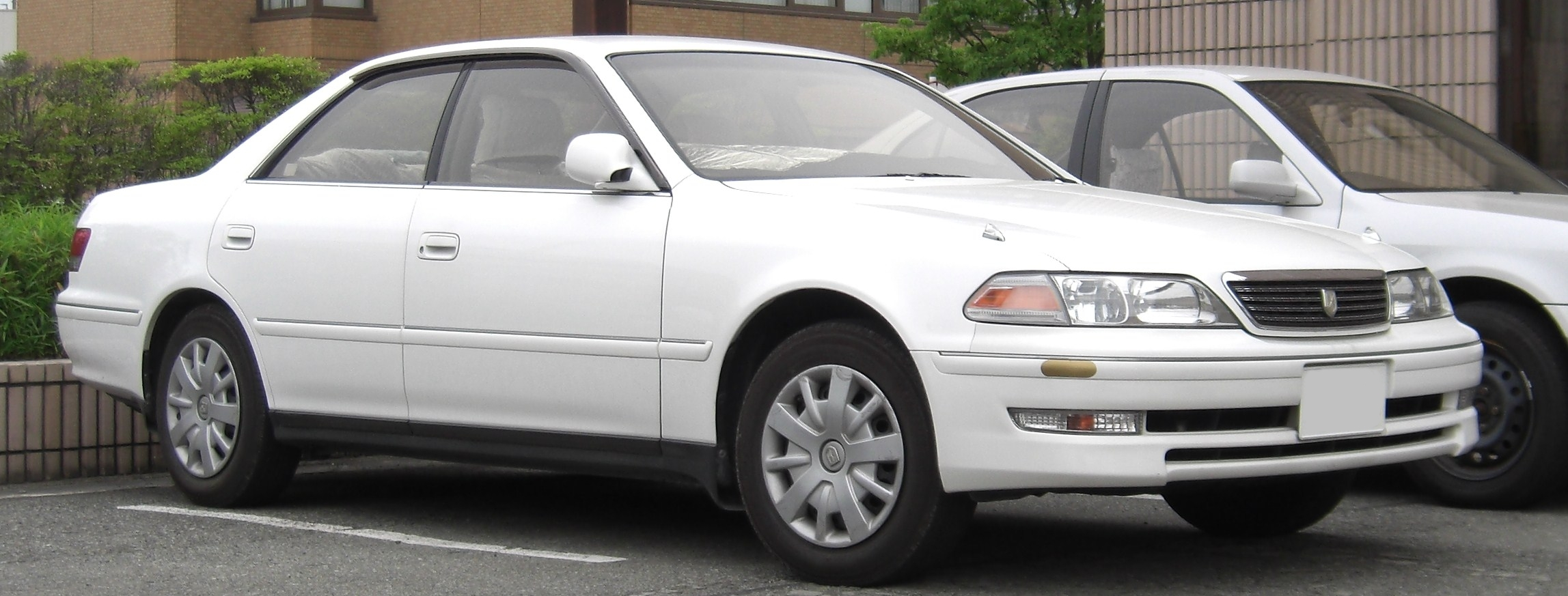
- Toyota Mark II Grande (JZX100)

Overview
- Manufacturer: Toyota
- Also called: Toyopet Corona Mark II (1968–1980); Toyota Corona Mark II (1968–1976); Toyota Cressida (1976–1992)
- Production: September 1968 – October 2004 (Mark II Blit/wagon production continues until 2007)
- Assembly: Japan: Toyota, Aichi (Motomachi plant (September 1968 – October 1993); Japan: Miyawaka, Fukuoka (Toyota Motor Kyushu: December 1992 – October 2000); Indonesia: Jakarta (as Cressida)

Body and chassis
- Class: Compact car (1968–1976); Mid-size car (1976–2004)
- Layout: Front-engine, rear-wheel-drive; Front-engine, four-wheel-drive (1993–2007)
- Related: Toyota Corona (1968–1972); Toyota Chaser (1977–2001); Toyota Cresta (1980–2001); Toyota Verossa (2001–2004)

Chronology
- Successor: Toyota Mark X (Japan); Toyota Vienta (Australia); Toyota Avalon (North America); Toyota Soarer (for coupé); Toyota Comfort (fleet models)

The Toyota Mark II (Japanese: トヨタ・マークII, Hepburn: Toyota Māku Tsū) is a compact, later mid-size sedan manufactured and marketed in Japan by Toyota between 1968 and 2004. Prior to 1972, the model was marketed as the Toyota Corona Mark II. In most export markets, Toyota marketed the vehicle as the Toyota Cressida between 1976 and 1992 across four generations. Toyota replaced the rear-wheel-drive Cressida in North America with the front-wheel-drive Avalon. Every Mark II and Cressida was manufactured at the Motomachi plant at Toyota, Aichi, Japan from September 1968 to October 1993, and later at Toyota Motor Kyushu's Miyata plant from December 1992 to October 2000, with some models also assembled in Jakarta, Indonesia and Parañaque, Philippines as the Cressida.

Its size, ride comfort, and interior accommodations ranged from affordable to luxurious, and it was typically Toyota's most luxurious offering in markets where the more prestigious Crown was not available. Vans and fleet use versions were also offered, although they were gradually discontinued, with taxi production ending in 1995 and the Mark II Van ending in 1997. The last three generations were only available as four-door sedans for private use.

== History ==
The first series, called the Toyota Corona Mark II was an all new vehicle at its introduction in 1968, that sought to offer a car that was just under Japanese government regulations concerning maximum vehicle dimensions and engine displacement, thus allowing the Crown to grow larger and more luxurious. Using the established platform of the Corona sedan but slightly larger and wider, it was exclusive to Toyopet Store locations, and offered as a competitor to the newly introduced Nissan Laurel in Japan, the Isuzu Florian, and the Nissan Bluebird / Datsun 510 internationally that appeared August 1967, and two years after the Mazda Luce in 1966. The Mark II was the top-level product at Toyopet Store locations until the Toyota Celsior was introduced in 1989.

At the Mark II's introduction in the late 1960s, Toyota was known as a small, economy car manufacturer. The Corona Mark II was sold as a larger companion to the Corona while still being smaller than the Crown. In Japan, the sportier Toyota Chaser appeared in 1977 at Toyota Auto Store, and later in 1980, the Toyota Cresta appeared at Toyota Vista Store locations. As other automakers continued to offer vehicles in this size class, the Mark II's popularity peaked in the 1980s. The Mark II's siblings, the Chaser and the Cresta, were discontinued due to declining sales, partly influenced by the Japanese recession that started in the early 1990s and were combined into the short-lived Toyota Verossa. The Mark II evolved into the Toyota Mark X, a name chosen because it was the tenth generation of the car, which was popular in Japan and selected international markets until the growing demand for SUVs and crossovers, which saw the Mark X canceled in 2019.

== First generation (T60, T70; 1968) ==
First generation Toyota Corona Mark II
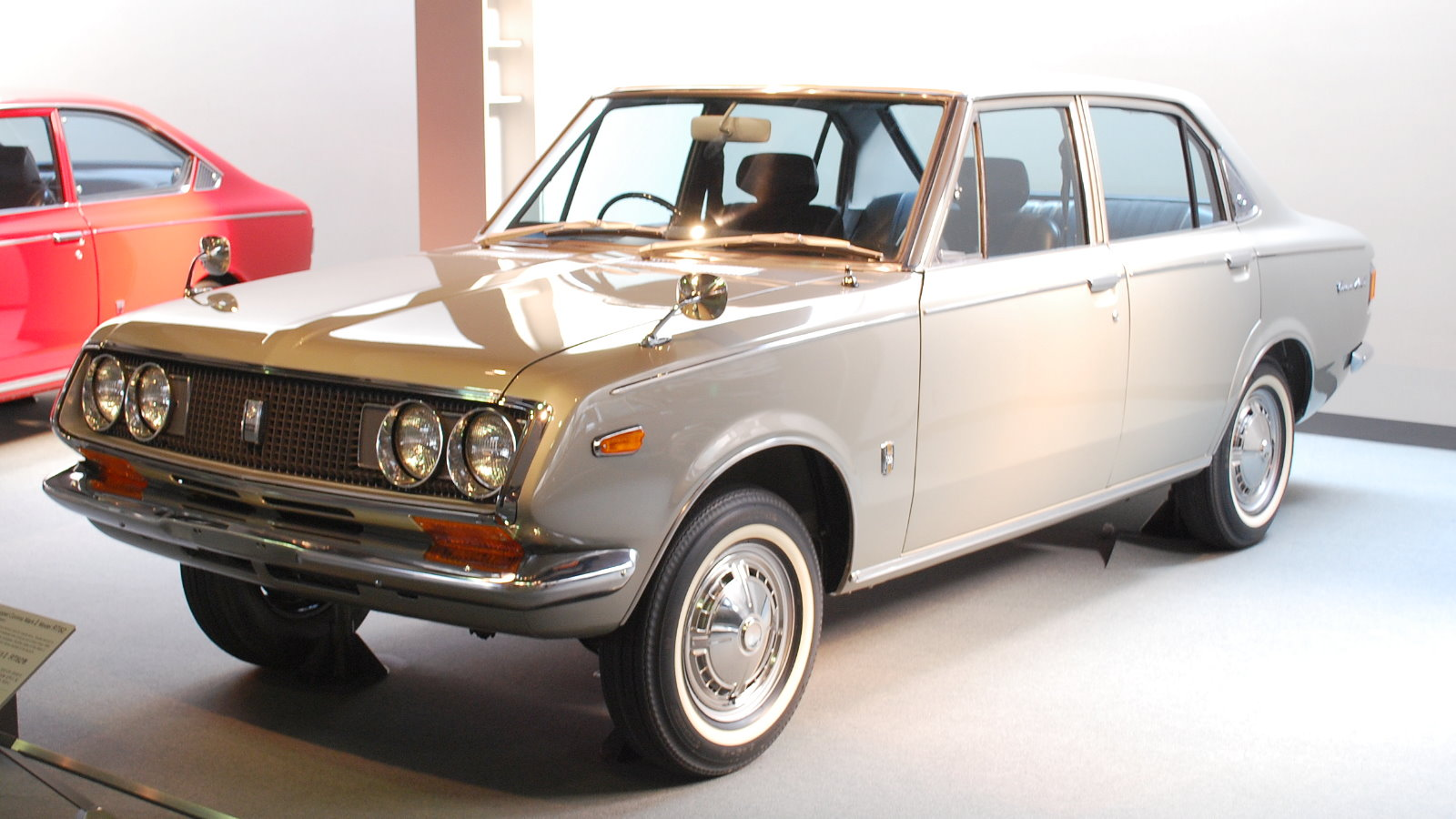
- 1968–1970 Toyota Corona Mark II

Overview
- Model code: T60, T70
- Also called: Toyopet Corona Mark II (Japan); Toyota Mark II
- Production: 1968–1972; April 1968 – July 1974 (coupé utility)
- Assembly: Japan: Susono, Shizuoka (Kanto Auto Works); Japan: Kariya, Aichi (Toyota Auto Body)

Body and chassis
- Body style: 4-door sedan; 5-door station wagon; 2-door coupé; 2-door coupe utility
- Related: Toyota Corona

Powertrain
- Engine: 1,490 cc 2R OHV I4 (RT66); 1,587 cc 12R OHV I4 (RT69); 1,591 cc 7R/7R-B SOHC I4 (RT60/67/70/76); 1,707 cc 6R/6R-B SOHC I4 (RT61/68/71/77); 1,858 cc 8R/8R-B/C/D/G SOHC/DOHC I4 (RT62/72); 1,858 cc 10R DOHC I4 (RT75); 1,968 cc 18R-C SOHC I4 (RT63/73/78/79)

Dimensions
- Wheelbase: 2,510 mm (98.8 in)
- Length: 4,295–4,320 mm (169.1–170.1 in)
- Width: 1,605–1,610 mm (63.2–63.4 in)
- Height: 1,395–1,405 mm (54.9–55.3 in)
- Curb weight: 950–1,030 kg (2,094.4–2,270.8 lb)

The Corona Mark II, first offered for sale in Japan, September 1968, at Toyopet Store dealerships, was intended as an alternative model to the more established luxury sedan, the Crown, sold at Toyota Store dealerships, and the smaller Corona, also available at Toyopet Stores. It was a slightly larger vehicle than the Corona with a higher level of equipment offered at the time, sharing some of the features of the larger Crown, but taking the top position at Toyopet Store locations. At its introduction, the Mark II was third in Toyota's hierarchy of sedans, below the Crown and the all new, hand built, V8-engined limousine called the Toyota Century. Its competitor was primarily the Nissan Laurel in Japan, released earlier that year in April.

The trim packages started with the Mark II, followed by the Mark II Deluxe, Mark II 1900 Deluxe, and the top-level Mark II SL. The four-door sedan was designated the T60, and the two-door coupé the T70. The 1,600 cc 7R series engine was replaced by the 1,700 cc 6R series engine. A year later the 1,500 cc 2R models were replaced by the 1,600 cc 12R engines. The RT62 sedans and the RT72 coupé feature the 1.9-litre 8R four-cylinder engine, unique to the Mark II. The RT63 sedan, RT73 coupé, and RT78/RT79 station wagons feature a two-litre 18R four-cylinder engine, also unique to the Mark II. While only two engines were available yearly to Japanese buyers, yearly changes would be introduced; each year, the two engine choices had two different horsepower ratings. Due to Japan's annual road tax obligation, several trim packages were offered, paired with two engine displacements. The two engine choices kept the road tax obligation the same because the displacement was below the 2,000 cc bracket, which would incur more to be paid.

This was the only series offered as a two-door pickup for commercial use. The Mark II pickup also came as a "double cab" which meant it had a conventional bench seat for rear passengers but only had two doors. Both forms of the pickup shared the same dimensions and wheelbase as the station wagon.

The suspension setup uses a double wishbone with coil springs at the front and leaf springs at the back with a front-engine, rear-drive powertrain format. The Mark II is longer, at 4,295 mm (169.1 in) over the Corona's length of 162.4 in (4,125 mm) for the sedan, and the coupe, with a width of 1,610 mm (63.4 in) in comparison to 61 in (1,549 mm) for the sedan and coupe. The height of the Mark II is lower at 1,405 mm (55.3 in) over 1,420 mm (55.9 in) for the sedan, but higher at 1,374 mm (54.1 in) for the coupé. The wheelbase for all body styles was a constant 2,510 mm (98.8 in) and was longer than the Corona's sedan wheelbase of 2,420 mm (95.3 in).

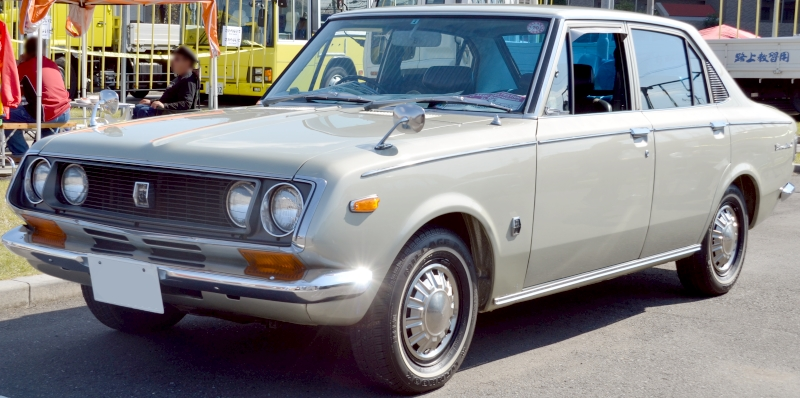
1970–1971 Toyota Corona Mark II (front)

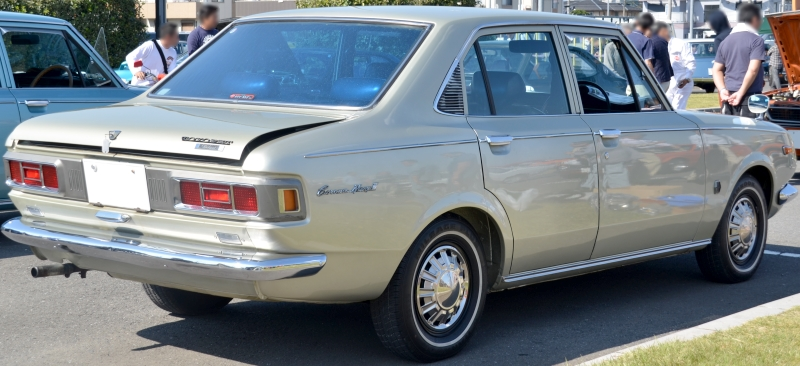
1970–1971 Toyota Corona Mark II (rear)

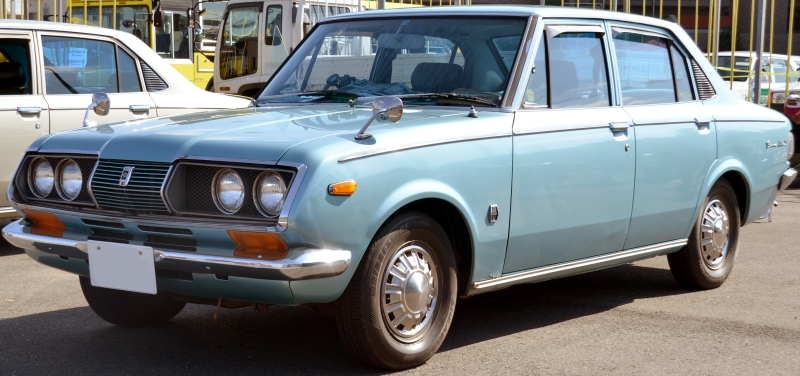
1971–1972 Toyota Corona Mark II "Eagle Face" (front)

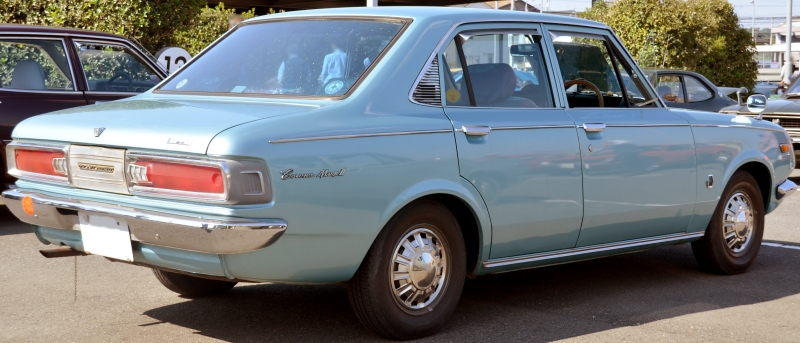
1971–1972 Toyota Corona Mark II (rear)

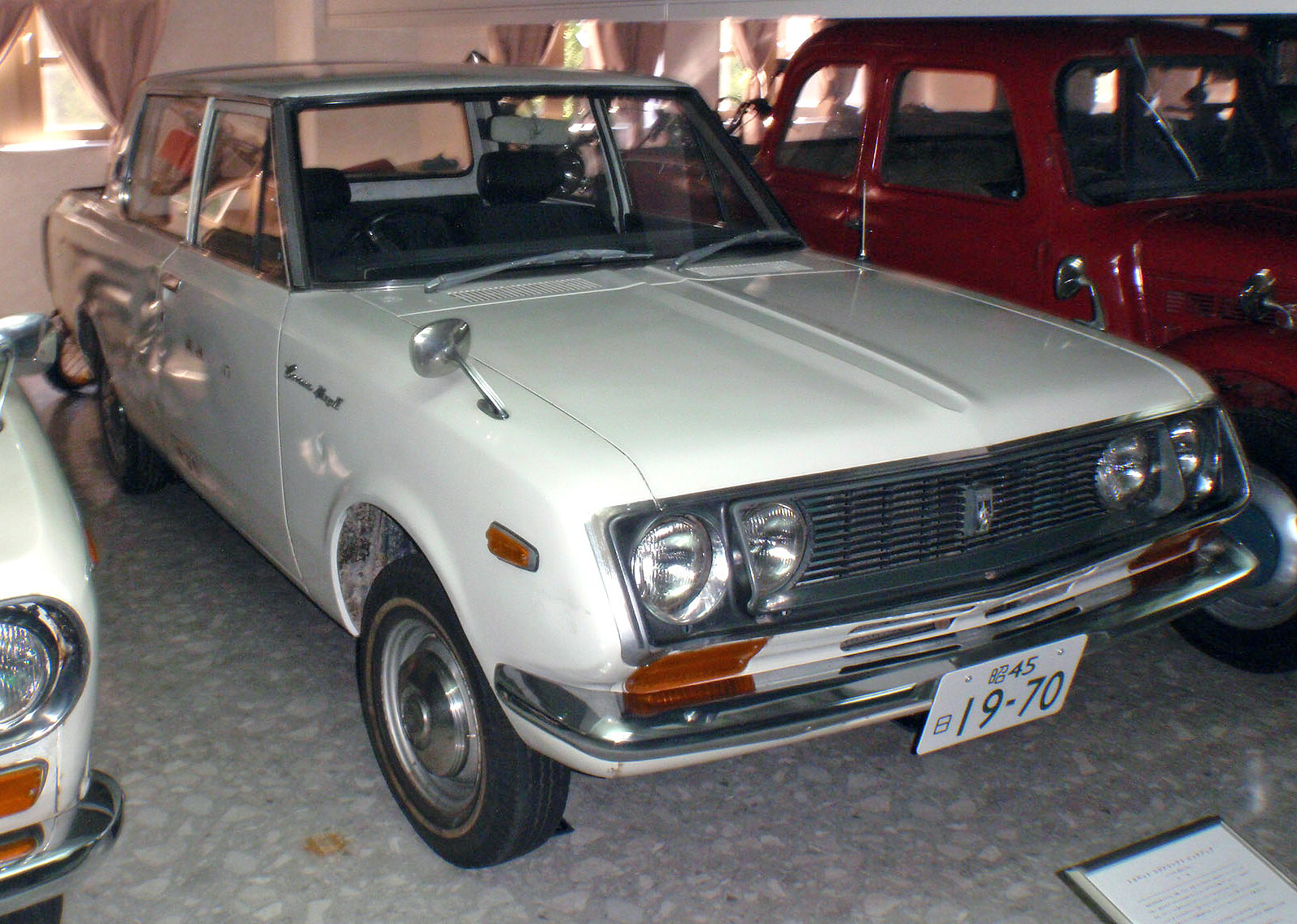
1970 Toyopet Corona Mark II pickup (double cab truck)

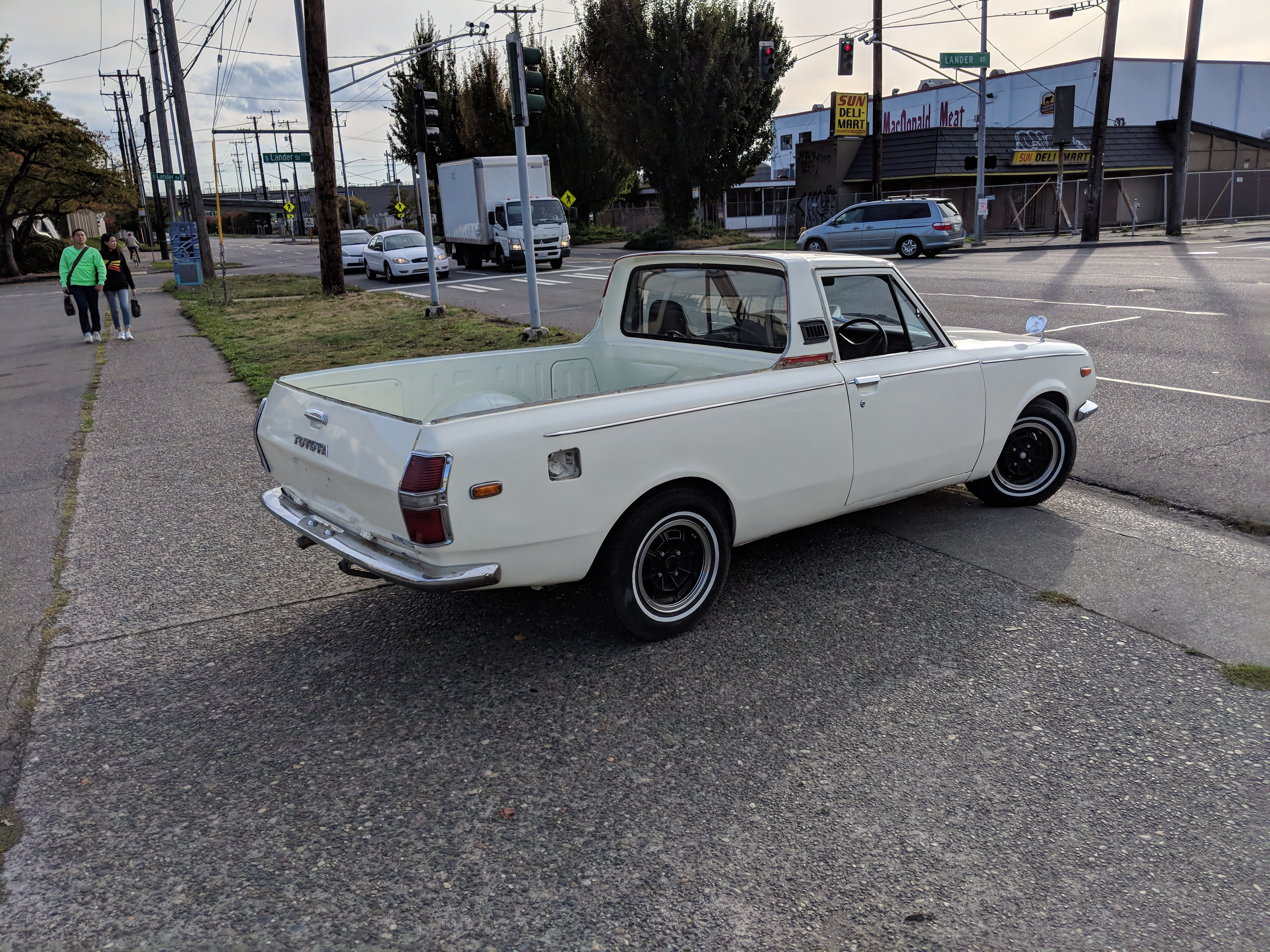
Toyota Corona Mark II coupé utility (late model)

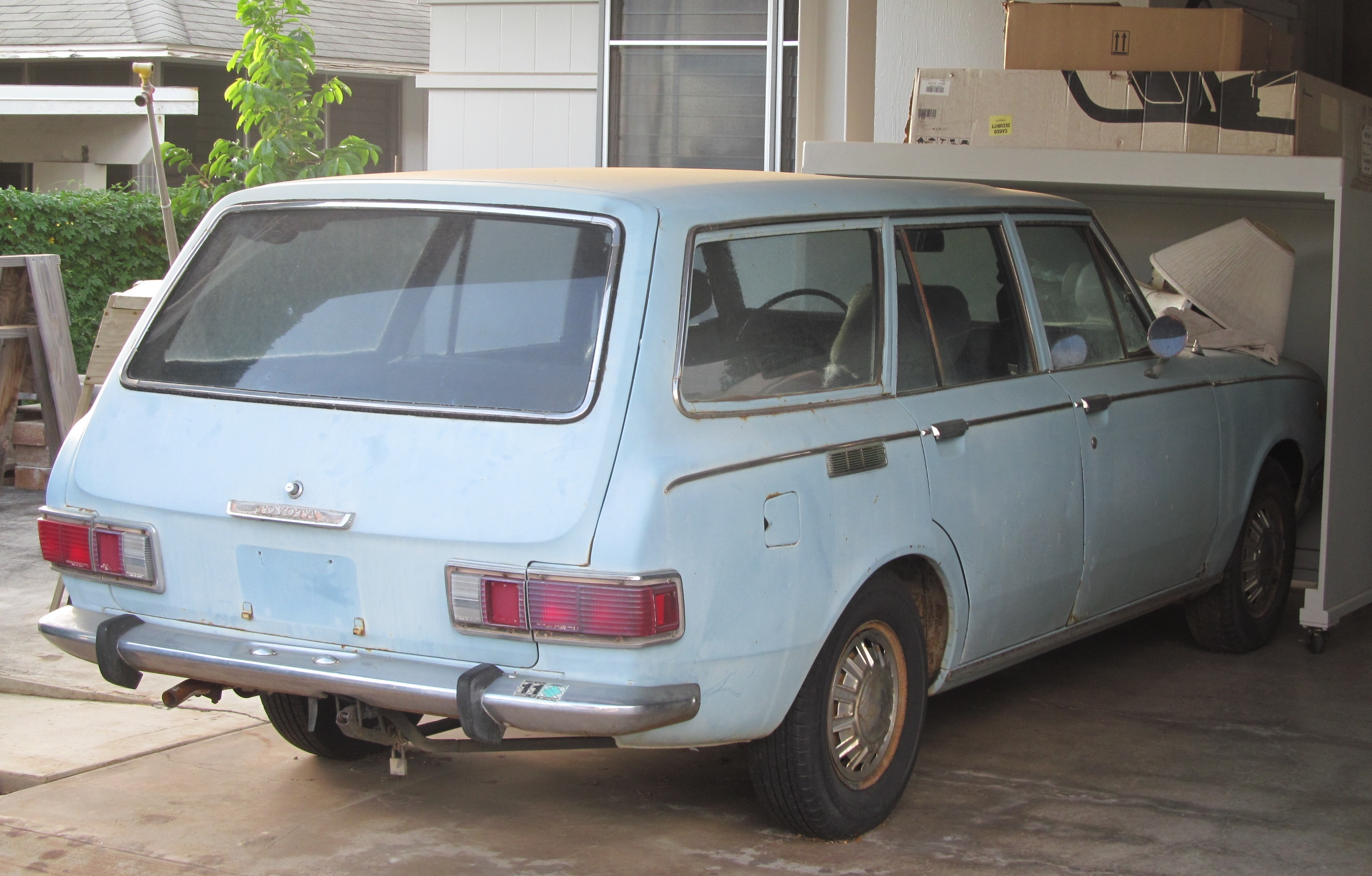
Toyota Corona Mark II station wagon (rear)

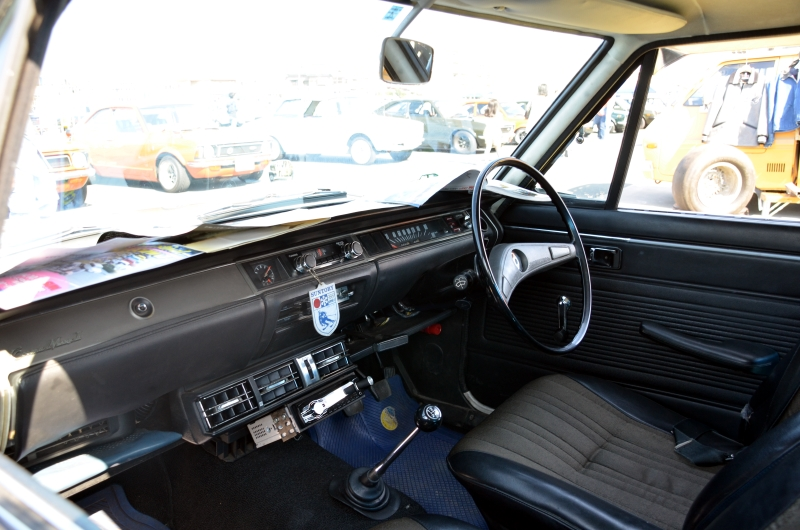
1970 Toyota Corona Mark II Deluxe interior

=== Corona Mark II hardtop coupe (T70) ===
Building on the introduction of the 1600GT performance hardtop coupe for 1965, the Mark II hardtop coupé was introduced in September 1968. Two trim packages and two engines were offered. The top trim package was the 1900SL (Sport Luxury) or the 1900 Deluxe using the SOHC 1900 8R-C. The 1900 SL came with power windows, a rear window defroster, and a choice of four exterior colours with a black interior. The instrument panel came standard with a round tachometer, speedometer, volt meter, water temperature, oil pressure, and fuel gauge. The 1900 Deluxe offered a red or grey interior, four exterior colours, and a 1970s-era sweep speedometer with engine temperature and fuel gauge only.

In September 1969 the Mark II went through a mid-model refresh and new trim packages were added. The 1900SL was the entry-level offering joined by the 1900GSL and the performance trim package 1900GSS was the top model and was installed with the twincam 1,900 cc 8R-G (originally called the 10R).

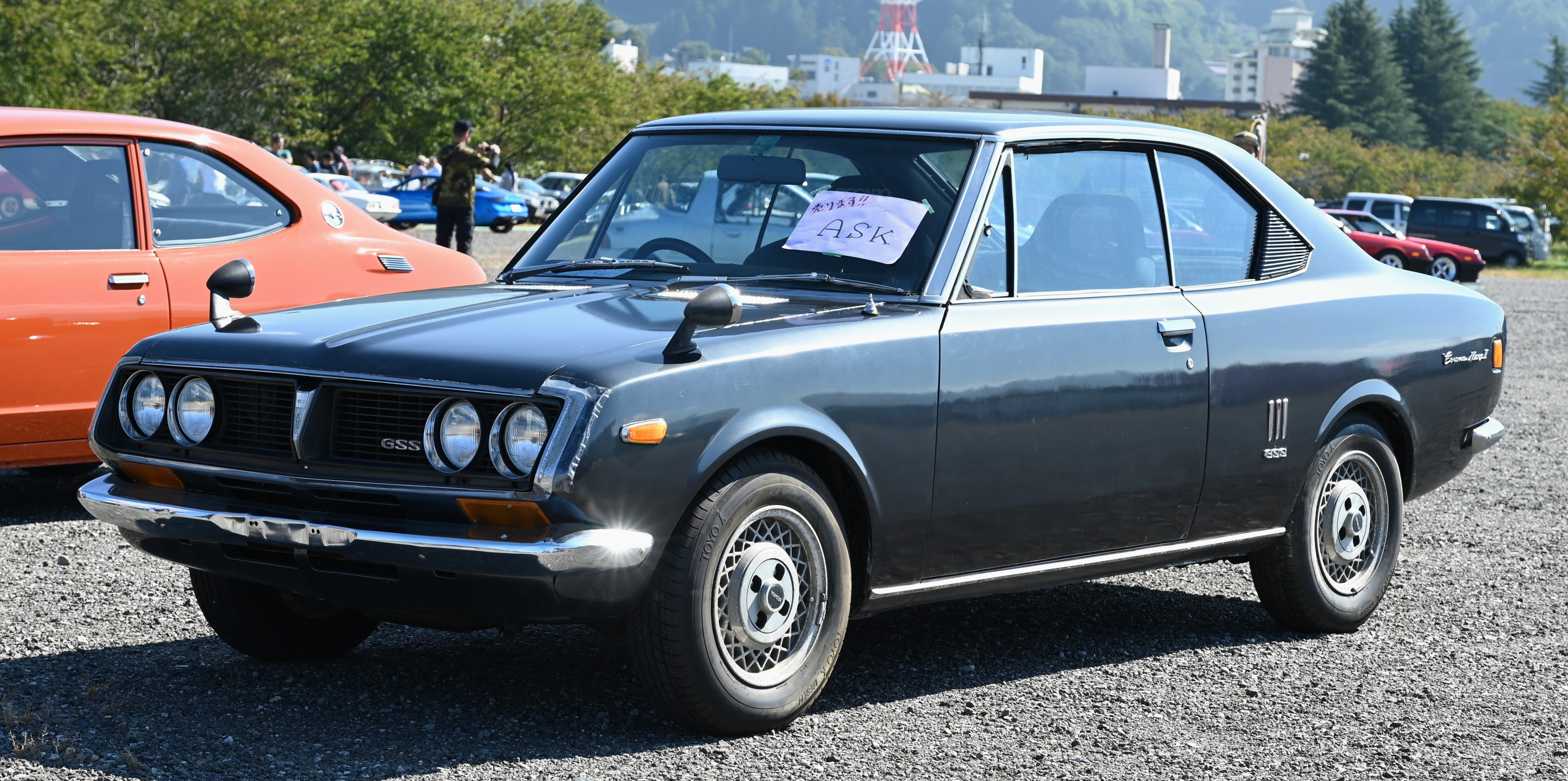
1970 Toyota Corona Mark II GSS coupe

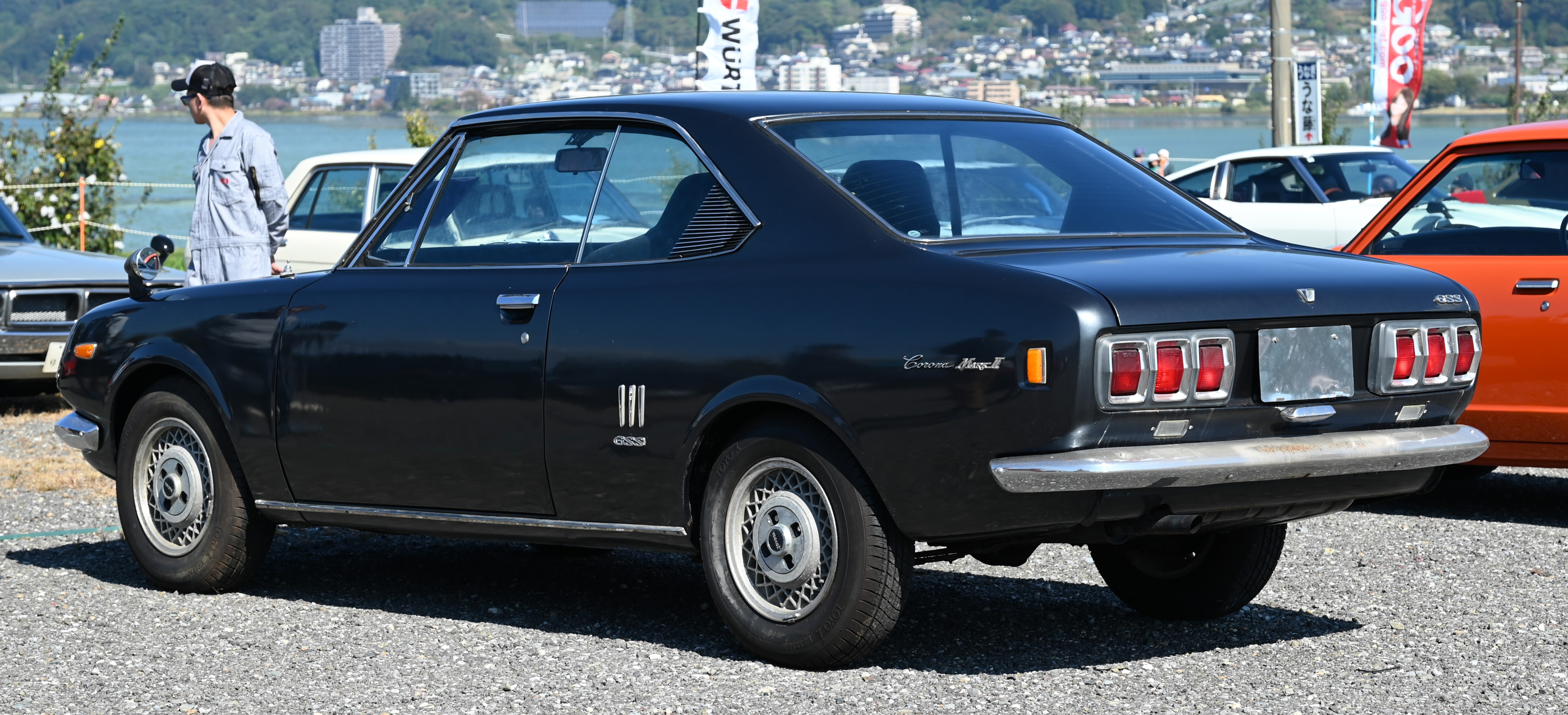
1970–1971 Toyota Corona Mark II coupe

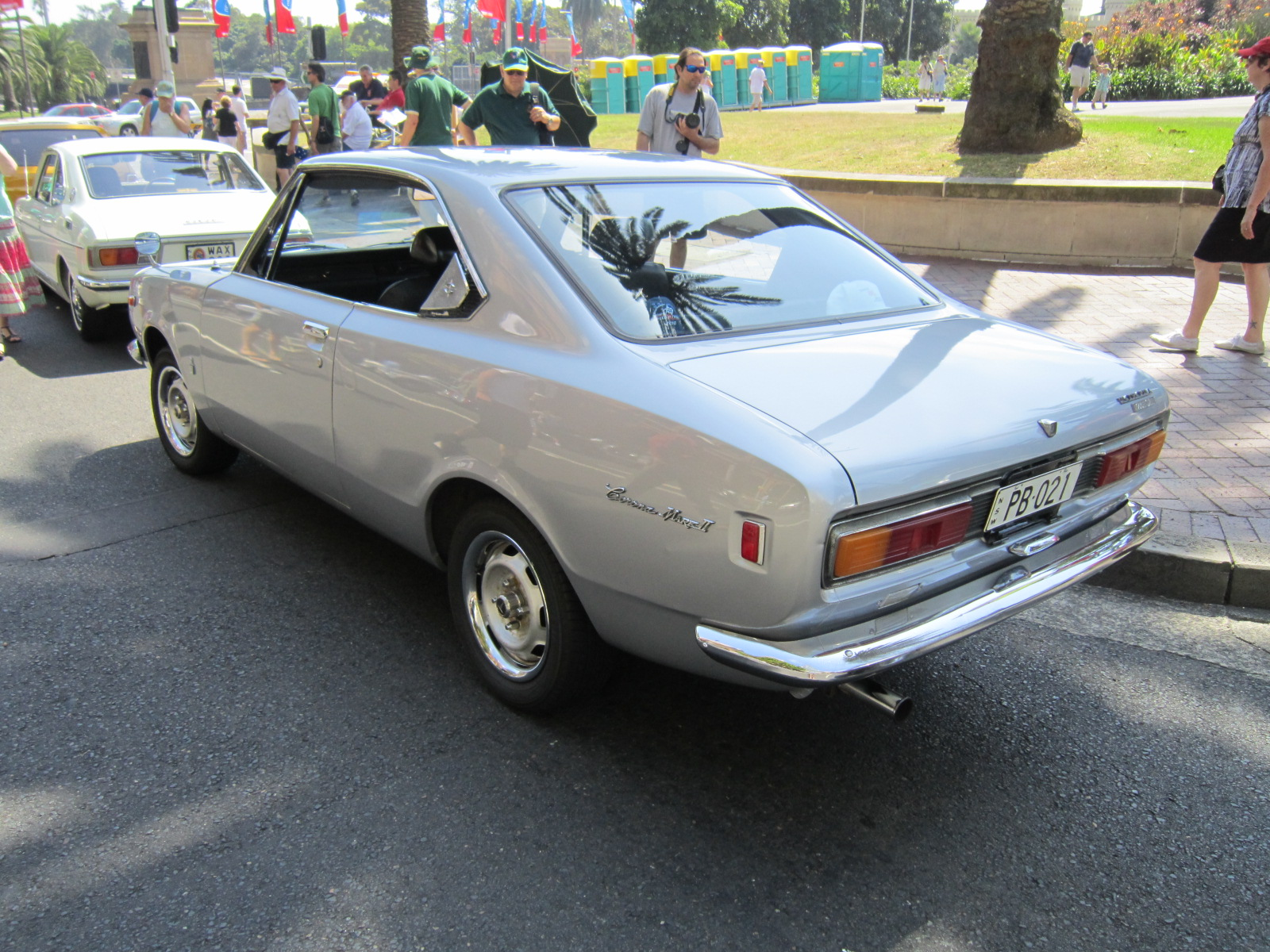
Rear view of facelift Toyota Corona Mark II 1900SL coupé (RT72; Australia)

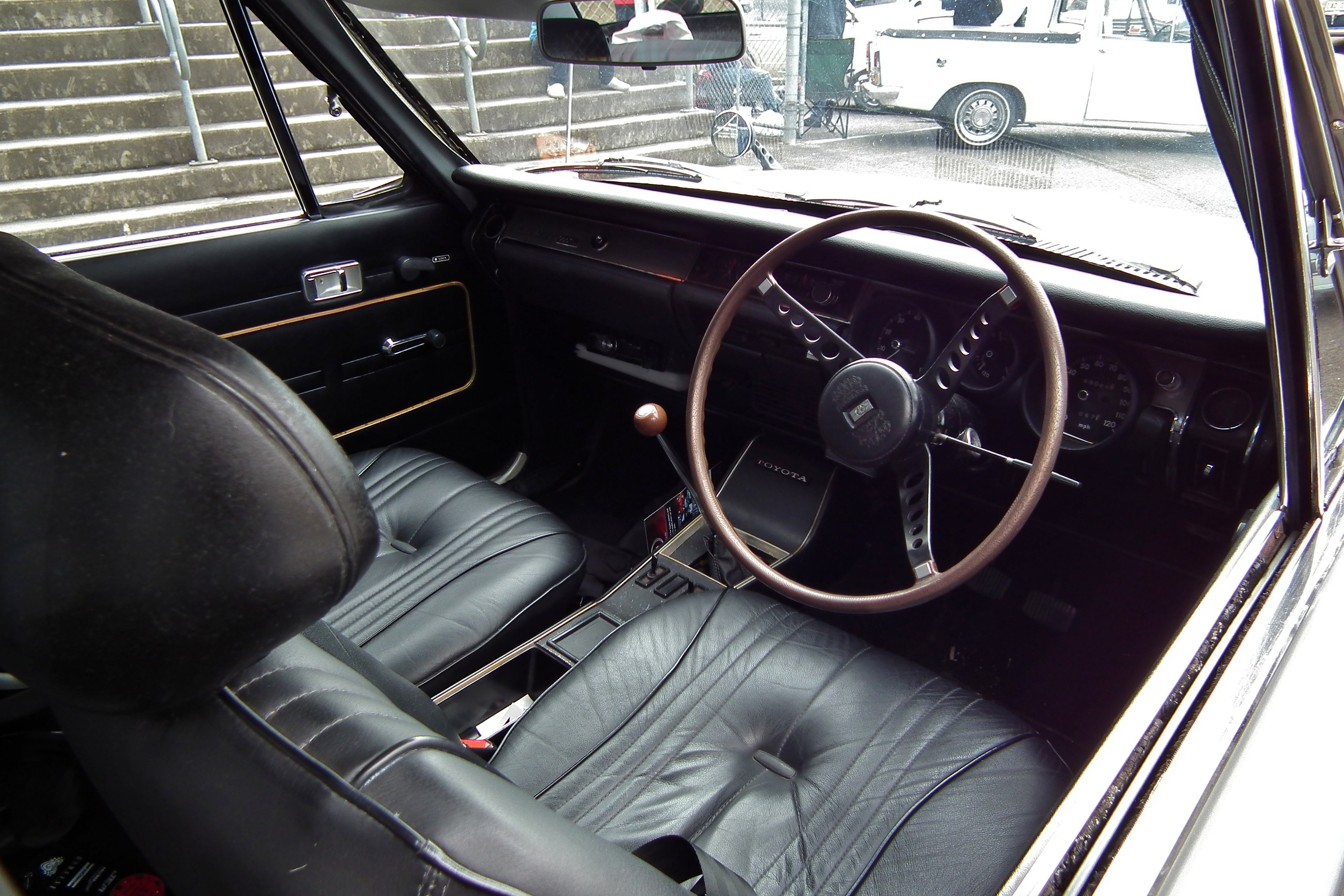
1970 Corona Mark II 1900 SL interior

=== North America ===
For North America, the Mark II was available with bucket seats for the driver and front passenger, a centre console with a floor-mounted manual transmission, electric rear window defroster, and a full size spare tire installed externally and underneath the cargo area on the wagon, with rear seats that fold down to a fully carpeted rear cargo area. The Mark II wagon was the largest wagon Toyota offered in North America, next to the Corona and Corolla wagons; the Crown wagon was no longer sold in North America. The US-exported versions arrived for the 1969 model year and often include the more powerful R series motors compared to other regions.

Before its US introduction, it appeared in South Africa, which was the first market to receive the 1900 cc engine. While Japan and other markets often had 1.5-litre 2R, 1.6-litre 7R/12R to 1.7-litre 6R models as well. Engines were shared with the Corona, with both using the 2R, and the 12R engines. Transmissions offered were an automatic transmission with three speeds for export and two speeds in Japan, or a choice of either a four- or three-speed manual transmission.

== Second generation (X10, X20; 1972) ==
Second generation Toyota Corona Mark II
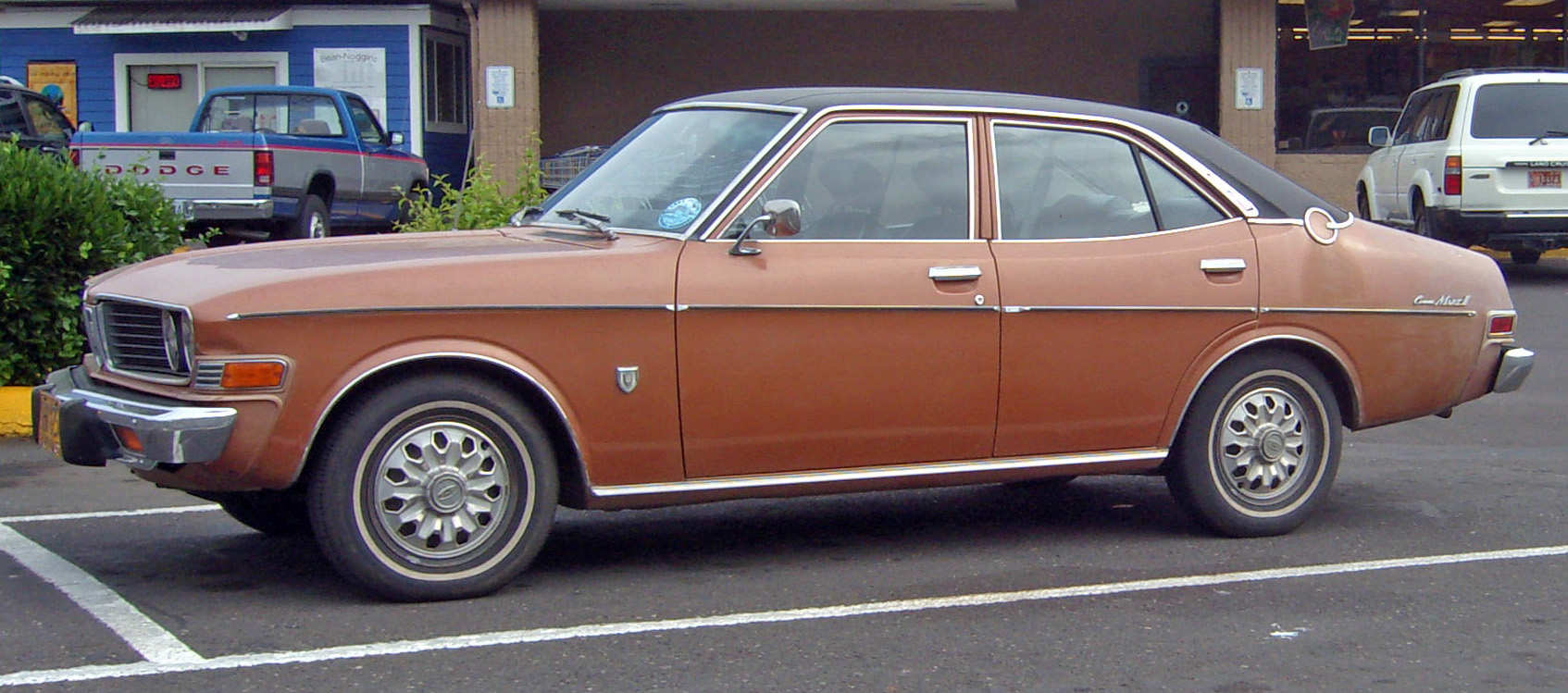
- 1976 Toyota Corona Mark II Sedan (US)

Overview
- Model code: X10, X20
- Production: 1972–1976
- Assembly: Japan: Toyota, Aichi (Motomachi plant); Indonesia: Jakarta

Body and chassis
- Body style: 4-door sedan; 5-door station wagon; 2-door coupé

Powertrain
- Engine: 1,707 cc 6R I4; 1,808 cc 16R I4; 1,968 cc 18R I4; 1,968 cc 18R-G DOHC I4; 1,988 cc M I6; 1,988 cc M-E fuel injected I6; 2,253 cc 2M I6 (export); 2,563 cc 4M I6 (export)

Dimensions
- Wheelbase: 2,585 mm (101.8 in)
- Length: 4,325 mm (170.3 in) sedan, hardtop; 4,350 mm (171.3 in) wagon; 4,420 mm (174.0 in) Mark II–L
- Width: 1,625 mm (64.0 in)
- Height: 1,370 mm (53.9 in) hardtop; 1,380 mm (54.3 in) sedan; 1,390 mm (54.7 in) Mark II–L; 1,425 mm (56.1 in) wagon
- Curb weight: X10: 1,080–1,485 kg (2,381–3,274 lb); X20: 1,085–1,410 kg (2,392–3,109 lb)

The second generation was based on a new X series platform, having graduated away from the previous T series chassis. In Japan, the second generation no longer used the "Mark II" as a trim package name and omitted the "Corona" model name while the "Corona" prefix was used internationally for brand recognition. The X10s are sedans and wagons, while the X20 is a two-door coupé. The coupé utility bodystyle was not updated, with the previous generation continuing to be built alongside the new one.

The second generation's styling progressed from the first and resembled the S60 series Crown. It reflected a popular styling trend that appeared internationally during the 1960s and 1970s, called "Coke bottle styling," which Toyota adopted for only this generation of the Mark II.

Japanese trim package names for the sedan were updated with the top level "Mark II-L", followed by the 2000GSL, 2000GL, 2000DX, 1700DX, and the wagon came as either the 2000DX or the 1700DX. The Mark II-L was the first time a six-cylinder engine was offered using the 1,988 cc M. The inline six-cylinder "M" series engine was borrowed from the Crown S60 to stay competitive with the Nissan Bluebird SSS (Datsun 610 in North America) and the Nissan Laurel in Japan. Engine displacement remained at two litres, but with the inherent lower vibration of a six-cylinder. Power, at 110 PS (81 kW), was between the outputs of the single- and twin-carb four-cylinder models. In order to accommodate the larger engine, the L also received different front sheet metal with a split grille. This style was standard in the US market, where it was also sold as a Mark II without the "Corona" badge. The US-market Mark II only received the six-cylinder engine and was also offered in the station wagon bodystyle. There were slight trim differences at the rear.

Interior colours and the upholstery used were specific to the trim package, while there were 14 different exterior colours to choose including 10 metallic paint selections. The Mark II-L and the 2000SGL came with full instrumentation and a wood-grained steering wheel, a wooden-handled gearshift selector for floor-mounted automatic or 5-speed manual transmission, while a column-mounted automatic transmission selector was provided for lower trim packages. The DX sedan and station wagon offered a front bench seat with individually reclining seatbacks while other trim packages and the hardtop coupé came only with a full-length centre console that could accommodate either a manual or automatic transmission gear selector.

The availability of engines over 2.0 litres was a new approach, obligating the Japanese driver to more annual road tax and upper trim packages added more standard equipment and available optional items. An electric clock became standard on all models but was installed in the console for the Mark II-L and the GSL and was installed in the instrument cluster for other versions. The list of optional items included cruise control, air conditioning, electric rear window defroster, AM/FM stereo with a separately installed 8-track tape player, and power windows. Standard items added include a collapsible steering column in case of collision, three-point seat belts for front passengers with an audible seatbelt reminder, and power assist brakes with disc brakes for the front wheels.

In export markets, a version was sold as a station wagon, whilst in Japan, it was marketed as a van intended for commercial use. Due to the introduction of the Toyota Hilux pickup truck, the previously offered Mark II pickup was discontinued. The suspension carried over from the previous series, using double wishbones for the front wheels, while the coupe used 4-link with coil springs and the sedan and wagon used semi-elliptic leaf springs.

The engines offered began with the 1.7-litre inline-four and grew in displacement with increased standard equipment utilizing an overhead camshaft design. The X10 through 13 are sedans, 16- and 17-series numbers were reserved for vans, 20 through 23 for coupés, and 26 through 29 for wagons. The only exception to this scheme is the 18R-U–engined RX15, introduced in June 1976, which received the same chassis code whether fitted in the hardtop or the sedan.

In August 1973, there were minor changes and updates. The basic trim package wagon was offered with a five-speed manual transmission. Electronic fuel injection was introduced on the two-litre four-cylinder (18R) engine to increase power and lower fuel emissions. The four-cylinder 1,707 cc 6R engine was replaced by the 1,808 cc 16R. The 1.8 was discontinued in October 1975, leaving only two-litre engines of four or six cylinders in the Japanese market. Even after the introduction of the next Mark II, production of the second generation continued through November 1976.

Engine choices included:

- I4 1,707 cc 6R (RX10/RX16V/RX20/RX26: 95 PS (70 kW))
- I4 1,808 cc 16R (RX11/RX17V/RX21/RX27)
- I4 1,968 cc 18R (RX12/RX22/RX28)
- I4 1,968 cc 18R-U (RX15, low emissions version)
- I6 1,988 cc M (MX10/MX20)
- I6 1,988 cc M-E (MX10/MX20, fuel injection)
- I6 2,253 cc 2M (MX12/MX22/MX28, export only)
- I6 2,563 cc 4M (MX13/MX23/MX29, export only)

=== Mark II Hardtop coupe (X22) ===
The hardtop coupe, offered as an alternative to the Crown Coupe, offered a visual distinction from the sedans and station wagons. The trim packages started with the "Mark II-L," 2000GSS, 2000GSL, 2000SL, 2000GL, 2000DX, and the 1700DX. Depending on the trim package, the coupe interior was only available in black vinyl or cloth, while the "Mark II-L" came in tan cloth. All came with a three-spoke steering wheel, but the appearance was slightly different. The sport steering wheel had a raised centre hub, while the DX was flat across. The Mark II-L, GSL, and SL had a wood-grained rim, while the GSS was black plastic. The list of optional items was shared with the sedan and wagon and included cruise control, air conditioning, electric rear window defroster, AM/FM stereo with a separately installed 8-track tape player, and power windows. Standard items added include a collapsible steering column in case of collision, three-point seat belts for front passengers with an audible seatbelt reminder, and power assist brakes with disc brakes for the front wheels.

The GSS offered the 1,968 cc 18R-G DOHC four-cylinder with dual carburetors for 1972–1974, upgrading to electronic fuel injection starting in 1975, while the Mark II-L coupe offered the 1,988 cc M straight six engine in 1972 then upgraded in 1973 to the 1,988 cc M-E fuel injected version. The transmission was either a four-speed manual or a three-speed automatic, but the GSS came with a five-speed manual.

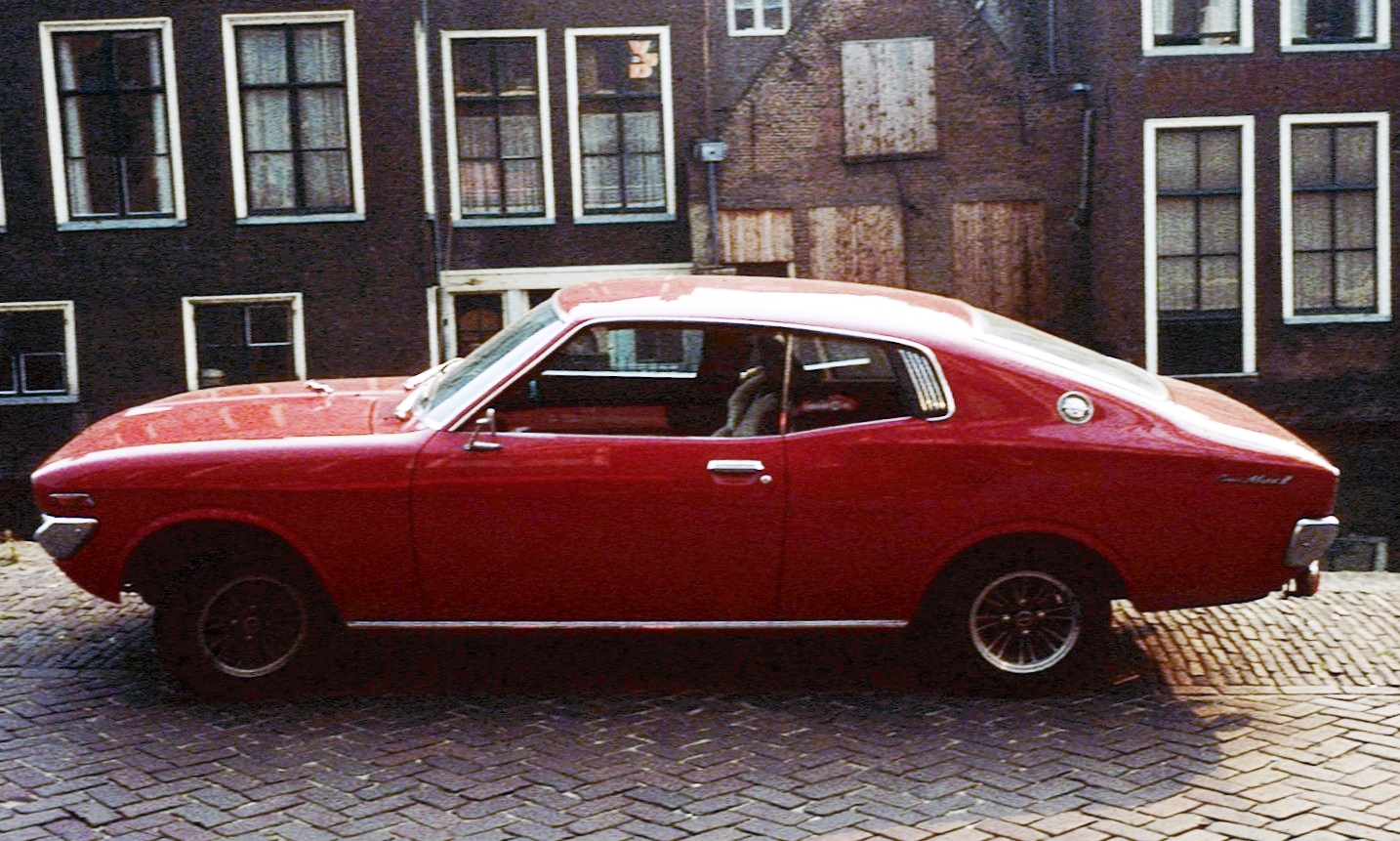
Toyota Corona Mark II Hardtop Coupe (Europe)

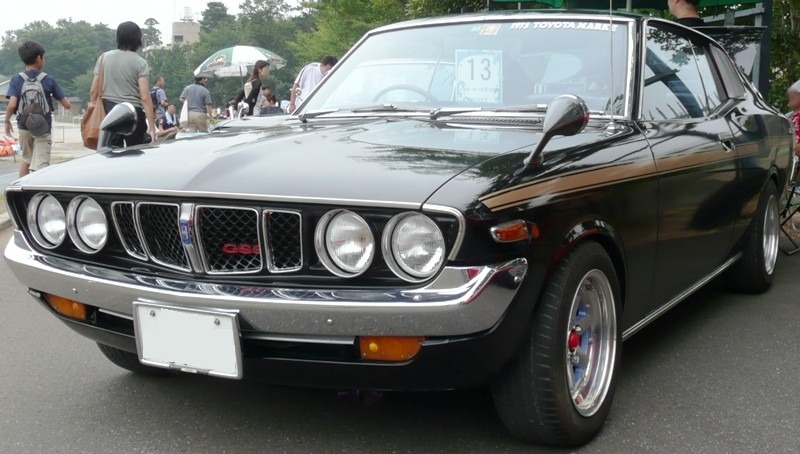
Toyota Corona Mark II Hardtop Coupe 2000 GSS (Japan)

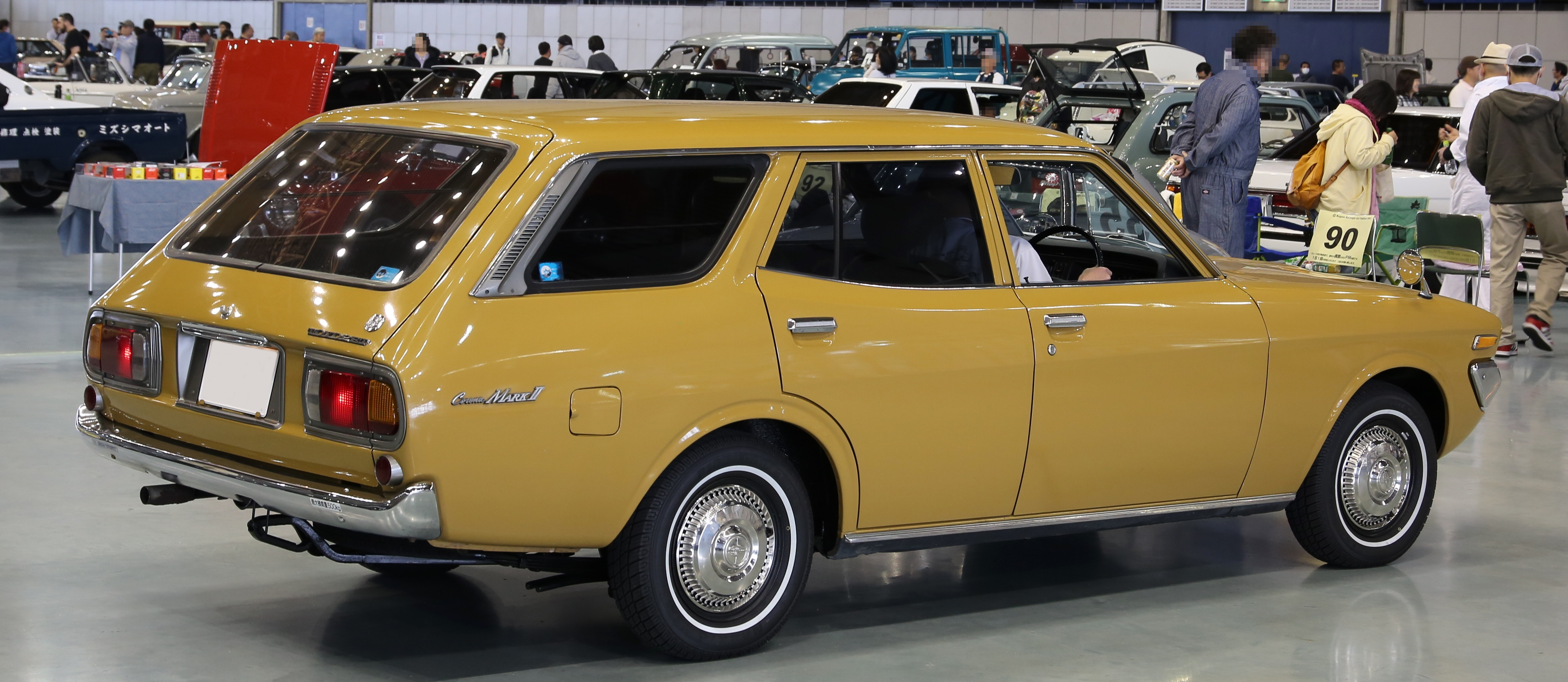
Toyopet Corona Mark II Van (Japan)

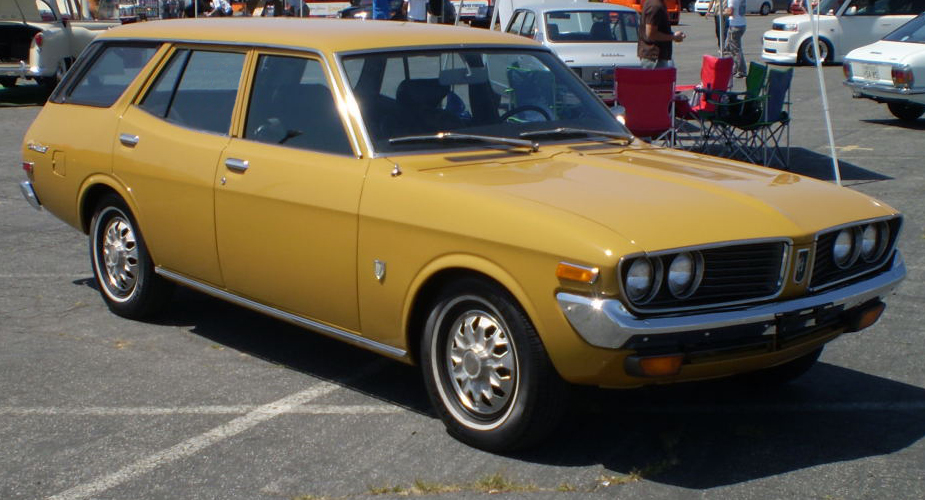
Toyota Corona Mark II Station Wagon (US)

=== North America ===
The Crown line of cars was no longer marketed in North America after 1972 due to disappointing sales. This left a gap offered by Toyota Motor North America, offering the Corolla, Corona, Celica, Land Cruiser, and Hilux truck. Fortunately, the second-generation Mark II increased in size and would be one of the few sensible options for families transitioning from larger American Detroit cars during the 1973 oil crisis and remain competitive with other Japanese makers selling their vehicles. In 1974, it was marketed in the U.S. as a fully loaded coupe, sedan, and station wagon with limited available options. Standard features included a six-cylinder SOHC engine, four-speed manual transmission, front disc brakes, heater defroster, and bucket seats. Some options were stereo cassette player, power steering, air conditioning, and a three-speed automatic transmission.

North American market cars had the 2.3-litre M-series "six" when they first went on sale in early 1972, but in August of that year this was replaced by the larger 2.6-litre 4M unit. Power, originally at 109 hp (81 kW), increased to 123 hp (92 kW). This was the only engine offered for the Mark II's next four years in the North American markets.

== Third generation (X30, X40; 1976) ==
Third generation Toyota Corona Mark II
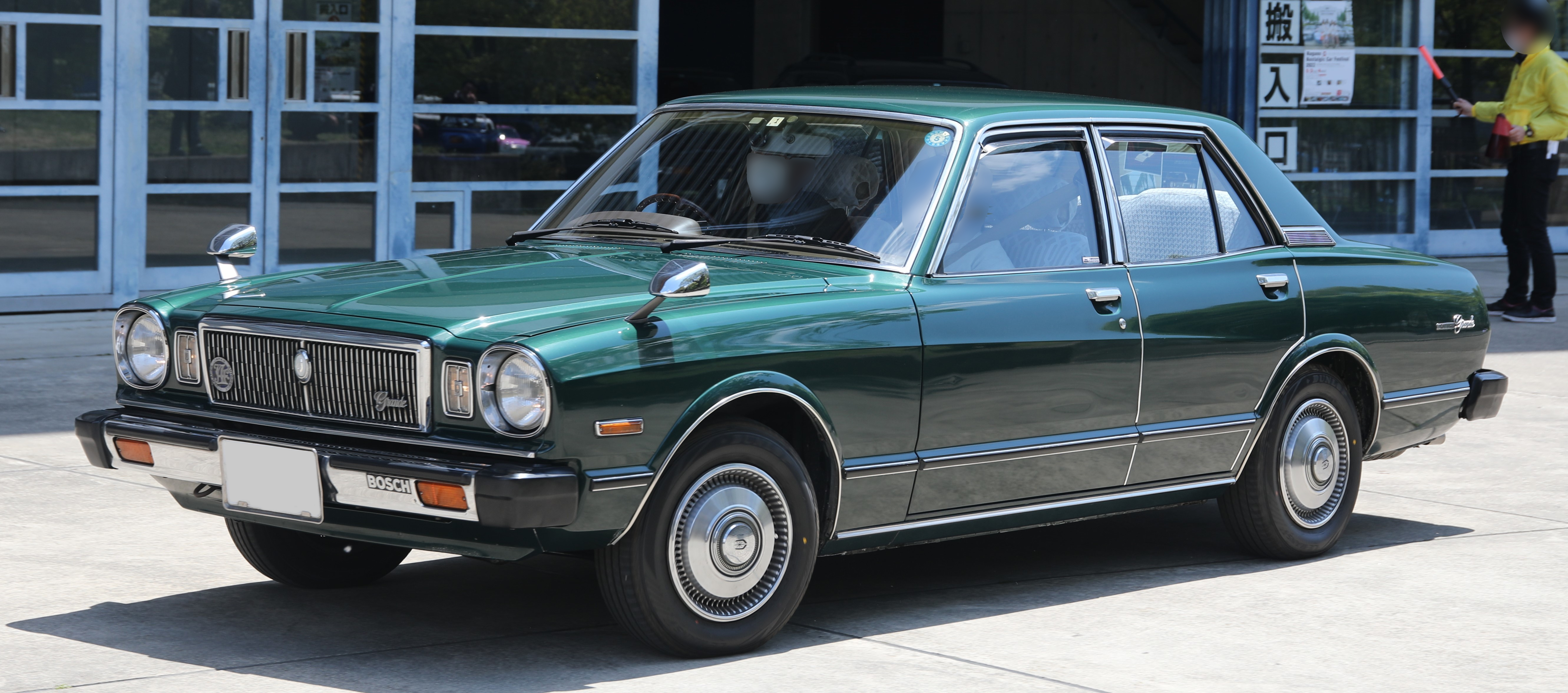
- Toyota Corona Mark II Grande (Japan)

Overview
- Model code: X30, X40
- Also called: Toyota Cressida (export)
- Production: December 1976 – August 1980
- Assembly: Japan: Toyota, Aichi (Motomachi plant); Philippines: Parañaque (Delta Motor Corporation)

Body and chassis
- Body style: 2-door coupé; 4-door sedan; 5-door station wagon
- Related: Toyota Chaser (X30)

Powertrain
- Engine: 1770 cc 3T-U I4 (TX30); 1808 cc 16R-J I4 (RX37V van only); 1968 cc 18R-U I4 (RX30/32/35); 1988 cc M I6 (MX30/35/40/41/45); 2563 cc 4M/4M-E I6 (MX32/36); diesel: 2188 cc L diesel I4
- Transmission: 4/5-speed manual; 4-speed A43DL automatic

Dimensions
- Wheelbase: 2,645 mm (104.1 in)
- Length: 4,615 mm (181.7 in) Grande; 4,530 mm (178.3 in)
- Width: 1,680 mm (66.1 in); 1,670 mm (65.7 in)
- Height: 1,415 mm (55.7 in) sedan; 1,390 mm (54.7 in) coupe
- Curb weight: 1,065–1,220 kg (2,348–2,690 lb)

The third generation was introduced with a more upscale, European-type design. The lines combine the previous generation's American styling with a British-looking front end rather than using the new corporate Toyota appearance as seen on the larger S80 series Crown. This model generation was amongst the last cars to feature the Toyopet brand name, which was dropped in 1980. The name continued to be used for the Japanese Toyopet Store dealership. This generation continued to offer Japanese buyers a competitor to the Nissan Laurel sedan, with the new Chaser intended as an alternative to the Nissan Skyline in Japan.

This generation offered as standard equipment a new windshield wiper and headlight switch installation, with the controls operated by levers attached to the steering column. A rear wiper was also available for all sedan, hardtop, and station wagon upper trim level packages. A steering column automatic gear selector continued to be offered on entry-level trim packages and a bench seat with individually reclining front seat backs. A parking brake handle was now relocated to the centre console unless it had a bench seat that used the version installed to the left of the steering wheel.

Some of the standard or optional items included power express down for the driver's window, a tilt steering wheel adjustment, a system monitor that would inform if the disc brake linings needed to be serviced, an AM/FM Stereo radio with four speakers, a separately available cassette player or 8-track cassette, full instrumentation including a volt meter and oil pressure, cruise control, and the rear seat back that could fold down to accommodate long items in the boot. Mid-grade trim packages with the four-cylinder engine and the automatic transmission replaced the tachometer with an econometer that used intake manifold vacuum pressure to display "power", "acceleration", or "cruising". Entry-level vehicles replaced the tachometer with an electric clock.

Some models had two-litre, six-cylinder engines (later also the 2.6), optionally with electronic fuel injection, borrowed from the larger Crown. For the Japanese market, all engines were gradually upgraded with Toyota's TTC-C technology to comply with the Japanese Government's Clean Air Act of 1975 and had a "TTC-C" badge on the rear of the vehicle. In July 1977, the fuel injected M-EU engine was revised and fitted with a three-way catalytic converter to meet the upcoming 1978 emissions standards; power figures remained as before and these models did not receive the TTC-C badge. In late October 1977, the 3T-U four-cylinder engine was upgraded to pass the new emissions standards with the aid of a lean-burn design. The X30-series chassis numbers were the original codes for the third-generation Mark II; models that complied with the new, stricter 1978 emission regulations were assigned the X40 series number. Four-cylinder engines were a cheaper alternative to the six-cylinder models and were typically used in vans and cars for professional users.

The suspension and chassis were updated, and used MacPherson struts at all four wheels, borrowing the rear suspension from the Crown, using semi-trailing arms with four links. All body styles were now integrated with a safety cage with crumple zones for the front and rear, a body-on-frame chassis was abandoned, and unitary construction was now used. In October 1979 a diesel-engined Mark II went on sale, a first for the model as an alternative to the diesel-powered Isuzu Florian, and the diesel-powered car was exclusive to Toyota Diesel Store locations.

In 1998, Toyota released a car called Progrès. The Progrès' front end resembles an updated version of the X30/X40 series sedan. Both feature a combination of round and squared lighting. The grille and bonnet also have similar shapes, sizes, and lines.

The Grande trim was introduced as the top-level trim package, available with either the 2.6 or 2.0-litre version of the six-cylinder engine; it was the only version to be offered with the 2.6 engine in Japan, which was also not available in the Chaser. If it had the 2.6 L engine, a "2600" badge was installed on the rear of the vehicle and the bottom right portion of the front grille. The Grande trim name remained until the end of the Mark II nameplate. It was not until 1988 that Toyota would offer Japanese buyers an engine over two litres in the Mark II/Chaser/Cresta family again.

- Hardtop coupé trim packages six-cylinder
  - Grande, LG Touring, LG Touring-Extra, LG, LG-Extra, L, L-Extra
- Hardtop coupé trim packages four-cylinder
  - GSL, GL, DX
- Sedan trim packages six-cylinder
  - Grande, LG Touring, LG Touring-Extra, LG, LG-Extra, L, L-Extra
- Sedan trim packages four-cylinder
  - GSL, GL, DX, STD
- Station wagon trim packages
  - L
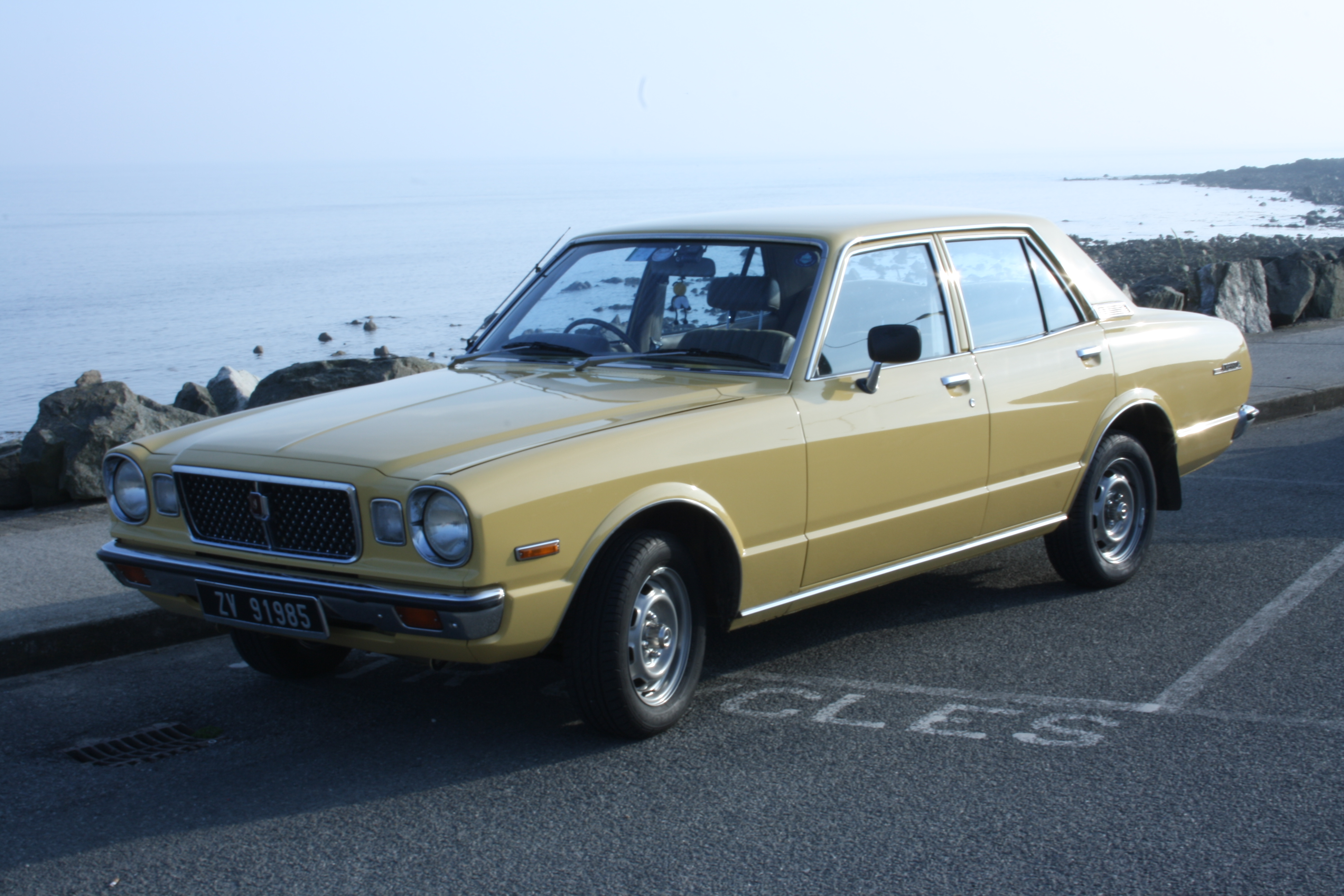
1977 Toyota Cressida sedan (RX30; Ireland)

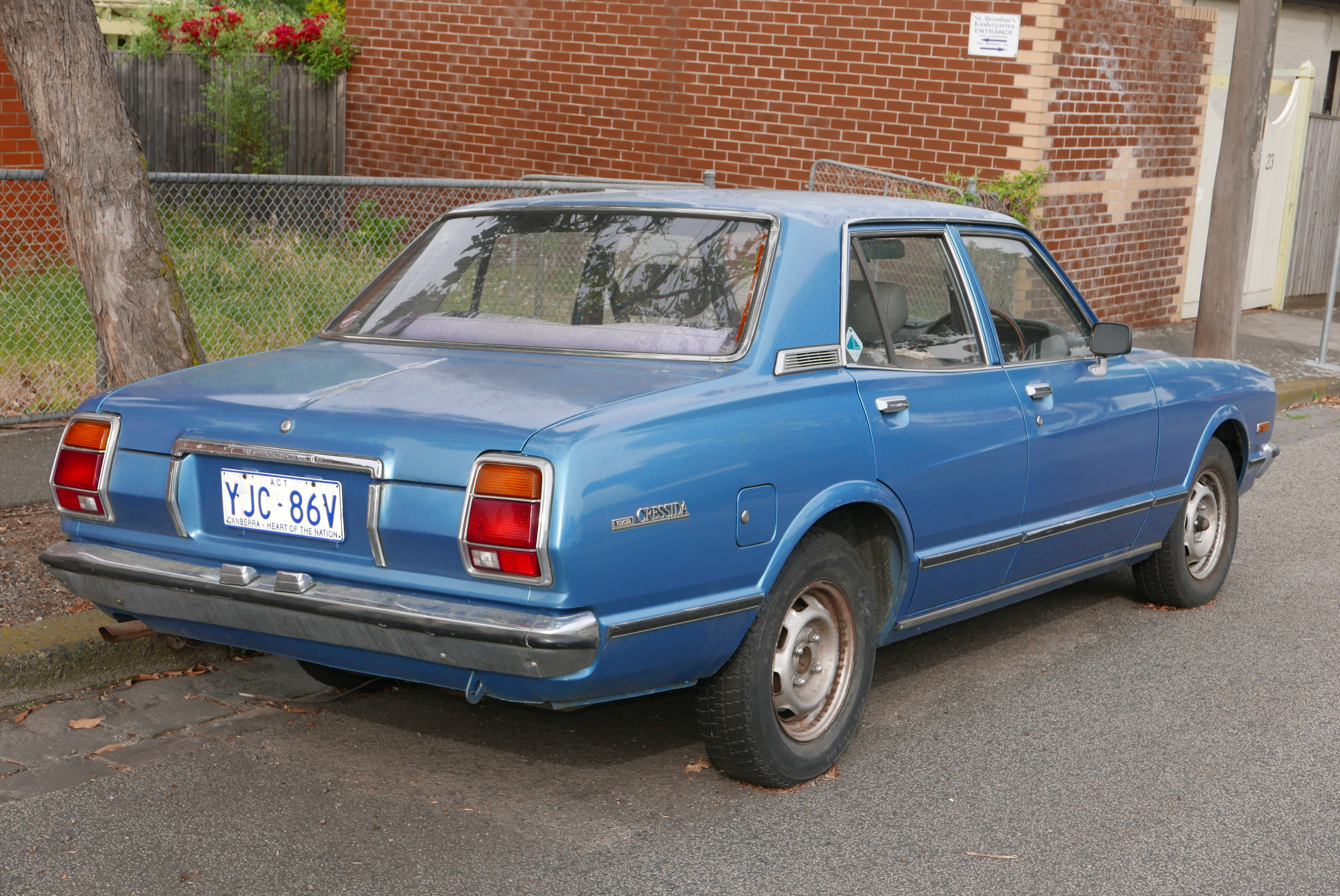
1977 Toyota Cressida sedan, rear view (MX32; Australia)

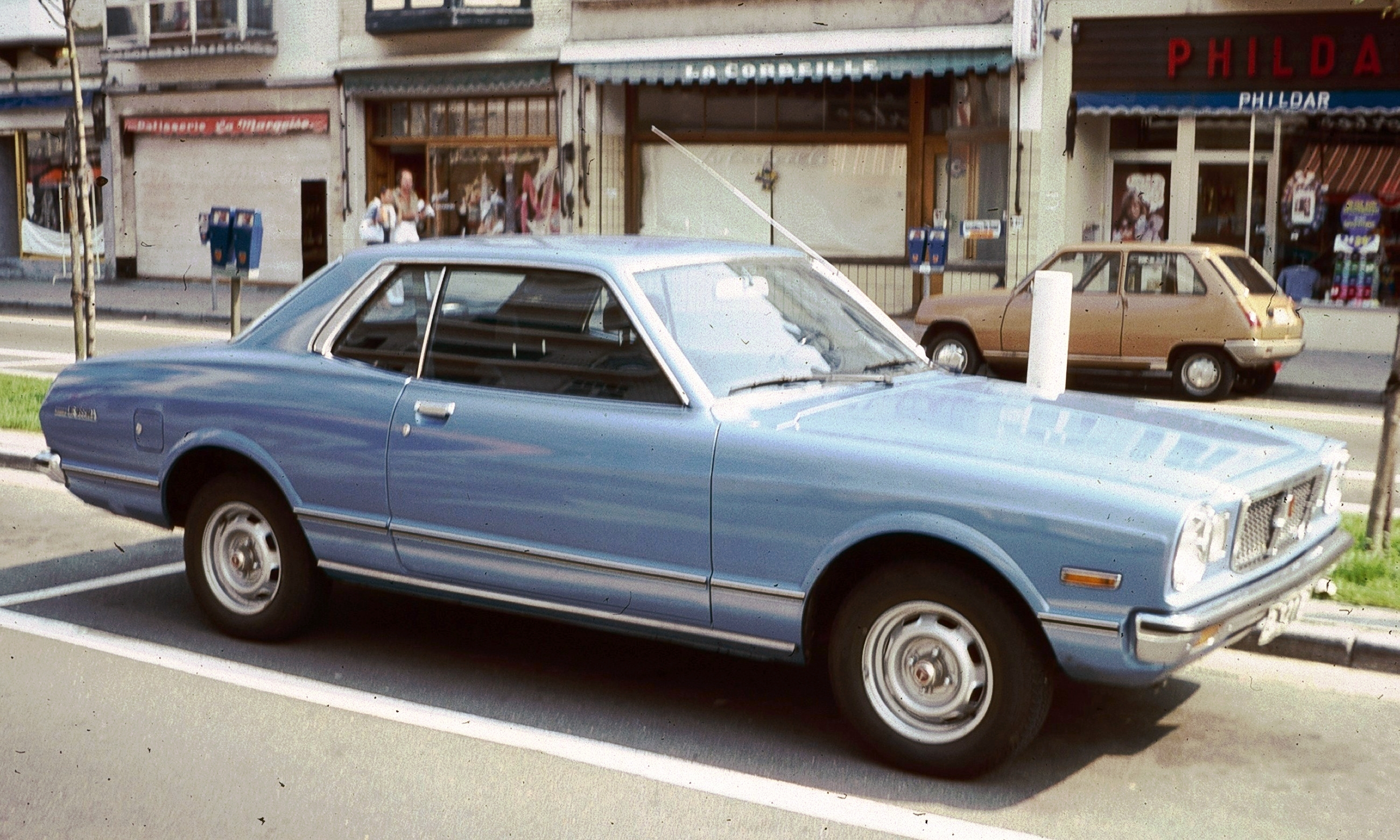
1977 Toyota Cressida coupé (France)

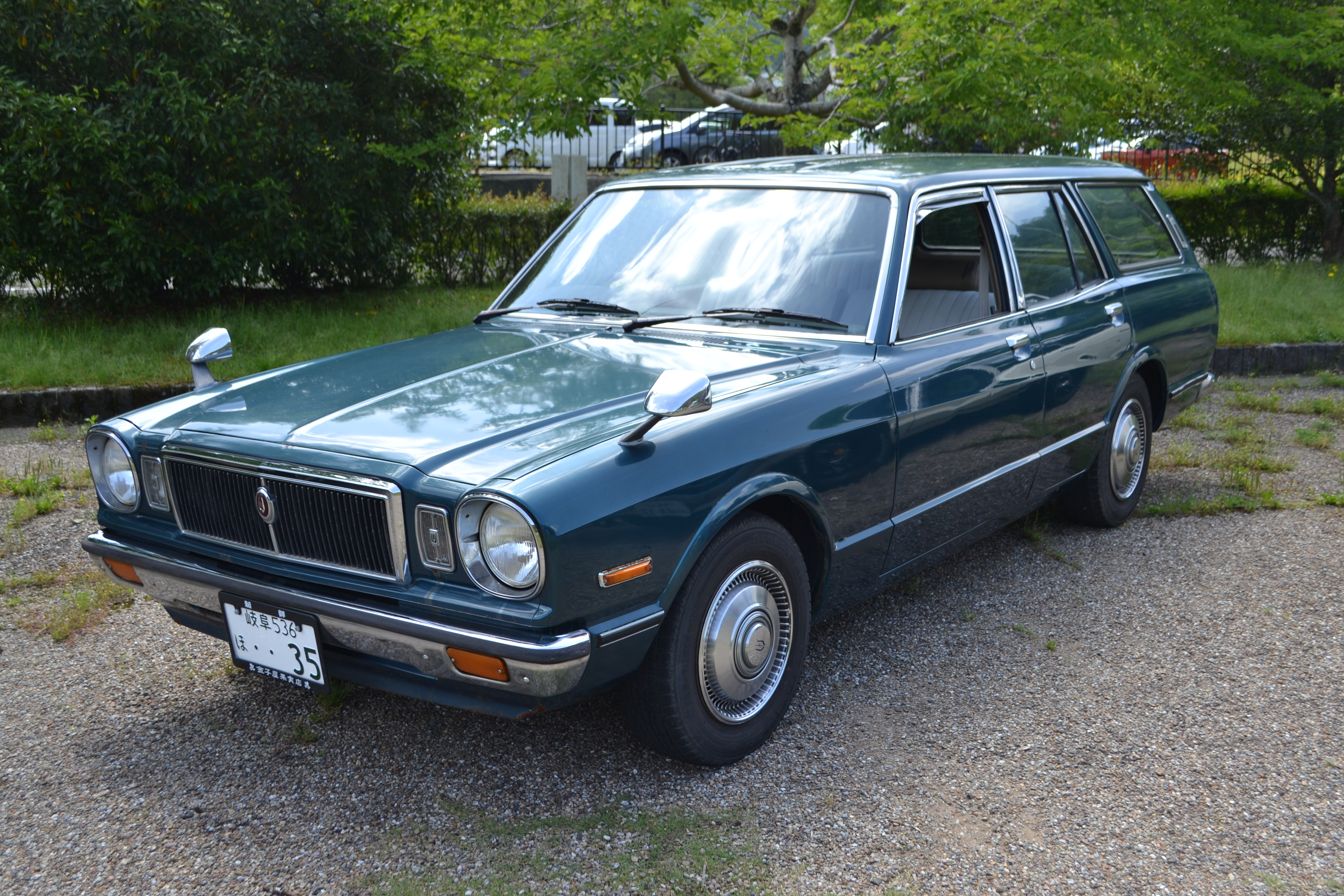
Toyota Corona Mark II Wagon L (MX35; Japan)

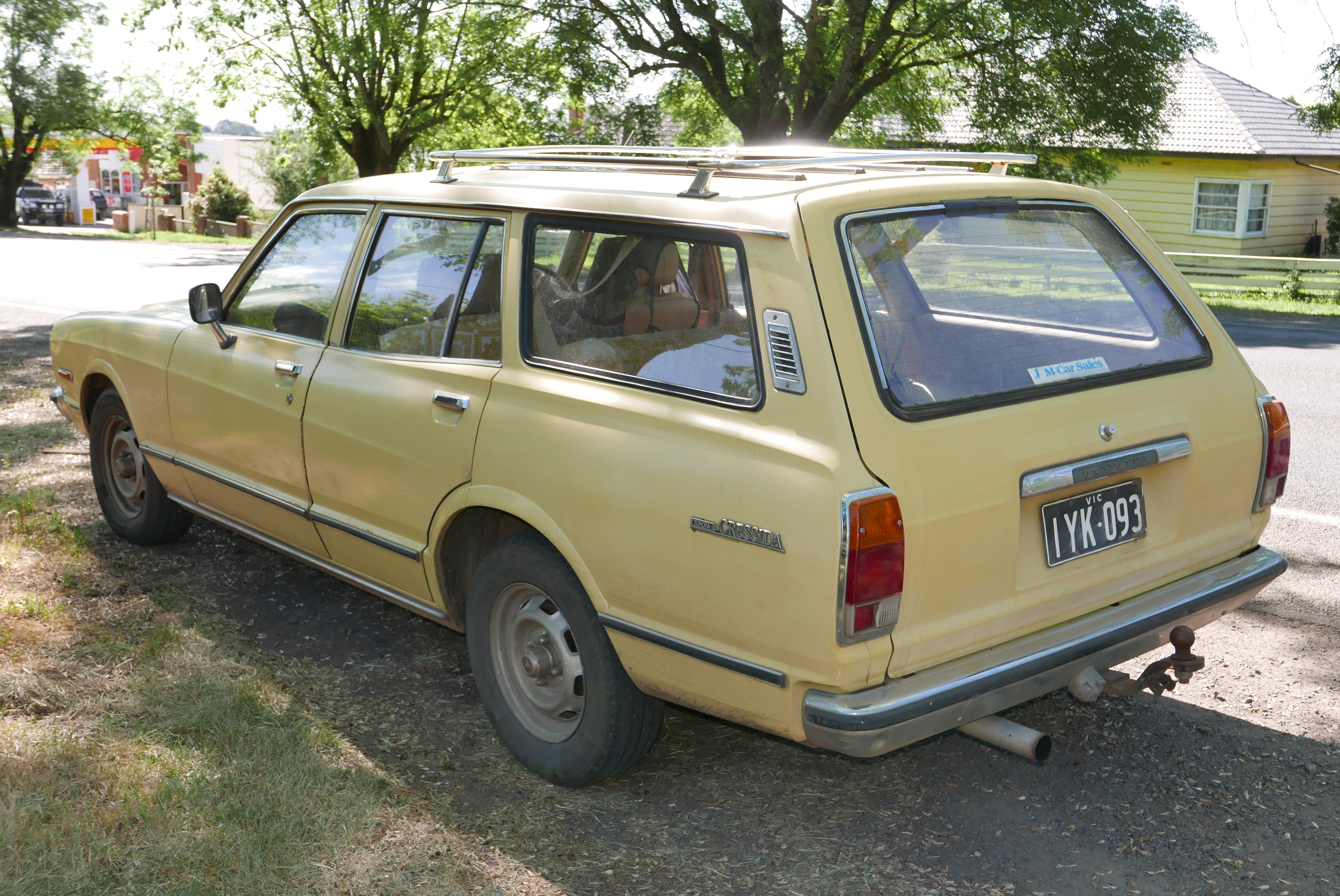
1977 Toyota Cressida wagon (MX36; Australia)

=== Chaser ===
The Toyota Chaser was released in 1977 as a competitor to the Nissan Skyline sedan. The first Chaser was a Mark II with a slightly differing front and rear treatment, of a performance class compared to the Mark II, and replaced the previous generation Mark II GSS hardtop coupe. Later generations received more differentiated styling. The idea of the Chaser was to offer a sportier version of the Mark II, which was sold at a Japanese Toyota dealership called Toyota Auto Store, often with larger engines. The Chaser was an alternative to Japanese buyers as the dealership had only offered one car called the Toyota Sprinter, which was based on the Toyota Corolla.

=== Cressida ===
For export markets, the Corona Mark II was renamed the Toyota Cressida, a nameplate not used in Japan. Production started in December 1976. The name Mark II was previously identified with the North American Continental Mark II which first appeared in 1956 and the term "Mark" is still associated with Lincoln Motor Company products. It was Toyota's largest sedan and wagon range offered in North America, while the personal luxury coupé wasn't offered. In New Zealand, a two-litre four-cylinder sedan version replaced the six-cylinder Crown in local assembly after the 1970s oil crises prompted the government to impose a 60% sales tax on cars with engines larger than two litres. A few fully built up Crowns were subsequently imported. In other markets, the larger Toyota Crown also remained available.

The name "Cressida" derives from the lead character in William Shakespeare's play Troilus and Cressida, inspired by Cressida, a female Trojan character.

Depending on the market it was sold in, it had the 4M carbureted engine (MX32, MX36), the 18R engine (RX30, RX32, RX35) or 3T engine (TX30). The North American models started with the carbureted 4M engine (MX32) but in mid-1978 the fuel-injected 4M-E replaced its carbureted counterpart – this was one of the first Toyotas in the US to use fuel injection. In 1979, the MSRP in the US was US$9,190. Cressidas sold in California were installed with the TTC-C technology to comply with the emissions regulations but were not given a badge on the back of the vehicle.

In New Zealand, where it was locally assembled and sold in a highly specified GL form (replacing the 2.8-litre Crown which had been hit by high sales taxes on two-litre-plus engine sizes), it had the 18R engine. The Australian-market Cressida received the 2.6-litre 4M engine, although in de-smogged form (meeting ADR27) it only produced 79 kW (107 PS) for relatively leisurely performance, but comparable, if not more power than the domestic, larger inline six cylinder engines offered by Ford, Chrysler and Holden.

Standard features included air conditioning, automatic transmission (a 5-speed manual was available), power steering, rear seat armrests, AM/FM cassette stereo with amplifier, reclining front seats, and a rear window defroster. The automatic transmission was a four-speed overdrive with an overdrive lockout. Power windows were optional. Soundproofing was extensive, and the Cressida was famous for being one of the quietest cars on the road at the time.

In the United Kingdom, the Cressida was available in both sedan and wagon body styles. The only engine available was the 18R and there was one trim level, badged De Luxe. Contrary to common practice, this was not the same as DX specifications on other Toyota cars, but a more upmarket version of the DX trim level. The Toyota Carina sedan and wagon also sold in the United Kingdom at this time were also badged as De Luxe (but were rebadged as DX from 1980 onwards).

South African Cressidas all received the 2.0-litre 18R engine, and were introduced in November 1977. The engine was built in South Africa by Toyota's Motor Assemblies subsidiary. Originally only a fully equipped L version was available, with a lower-priced semi-deluxe version appearing in the first month of 1978. A station wagon, Toyota's first in South Africa, appeared in August 1978. It was available in either semi-deluxe or full deluxe trim, the latter only as an automatic.

== Fourth generation (X50, X60; 1980) ==
Fourth generation
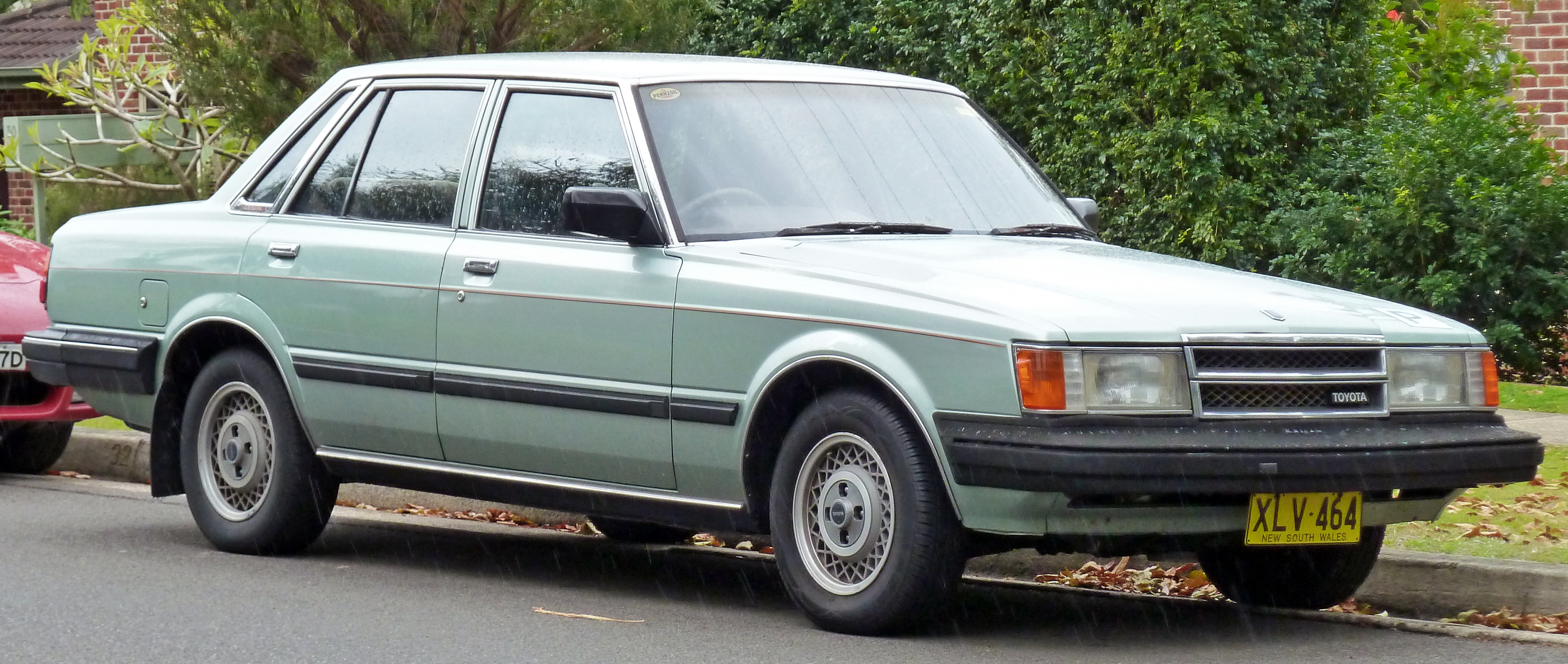
- 1983 Toyota Cressida GL sedan (MX62, Australia)

Overview
- Model code: X50, X60
- Also called: Toyota Cressida
- Production: August 1980 – July 1984
- Assembly: Japan: Toyota, Aichi (Motomachi plant); Indonesia: Jakarta

Body and chassis
- Body style: 4-door sedan; 4-door pillared hardtop sedan; 5-door station wagon
- Related: Toyota Cresta (X50); Toyota Chaser (X60)

Powertrain
- Engine: 1770 cc 13T-J I4 (TX67V); 1832 cc 1S-U I4 (SX60); 1968 cc 18R-G I4 (RX63); 1972 cc 21R (RX60); 1988 cc 1G-EU I6 (GX61/60G); 1988 cc 1G-GEU DOHC I6 (GX61); 1988 cc M-TEU turbo I6 (MX61); 2759 cc 5M-E/5M-GE I6 (MX62/63); diesel: 2188 cc L diesel I4 (LX60/67V); 2446 cc 2L-TE TD I4 (LX65)
- Transmission: 4-speed manual; 5-speed W58 manual; 3-speed automatic; 4-speed A43DE automatic

Dimensions
- Wheelbase: 2,645 mm (104.1 in)
- Length: 4,480–4,670 mm (176.4–183.9 in)
- Width: 1,680–1,690 mm (66.1–66.5 in)
- Height: 1,425 mm (56.1 in) sedan; 1,395 mm (54.9 in) hardtop
- Curb weight: 1,055–1,280 kg (2,326–2,822 lb)

The fourth-generation Mark II was introduced in October 1980. The two-door coupé was no longer offered, which was replaced by the Soarer. The fourth generation was now available as a four-door sedan, pillared hardtop, or as a station wagon, the last of which is marketed for commercial use in Japan. The all-new Crown offered the same bodystyles, also losing the two-door hardtop coupé. The exterior dimensions of the Mark II and Crown were essentially the same, and the Mark II continued as the top-level product at Toyopet Store locations.

Engine options were either the 1G-EU, turbocharged M-TEU, 5M-EU, and a fuel-injected version of the twin-cam 18R-G available in the GT. 2.2 and 2.4-litre diesel engines of the L family, with turbocharging available for the larger engine. The Mark II Grande continued to be available with a larger engine, the 2.8-liter 5M-EU inline-six producing 145 PS (107 kW). In 1982, the twin-cam 1G-GEU engine was added, and in 1983 the automatic transmission was changed to an electronically controlled four-speed. The top-of-the-line "Grande" version continued to be available, only in combination with the more powerful engine options.

The Van generally received less powerful engines, had very sparse equipment, and was somewhat shorter than its passenger car equivalent due to the use of more compact bumpers. This Mark II generation included commercial, taxi, and drivers training vehicles. The Mark II was common alongside the slightly smaller Corona as a taxi.

The X60 Mark II introduced the world's first voice warning system, which was developed and offered as standard equipment. In Indonesia, it was sold as the Mark II with the 99 PS (73 kW) DIN (105 PS JIS) 21R engine (RX60) beginning in late 1981.

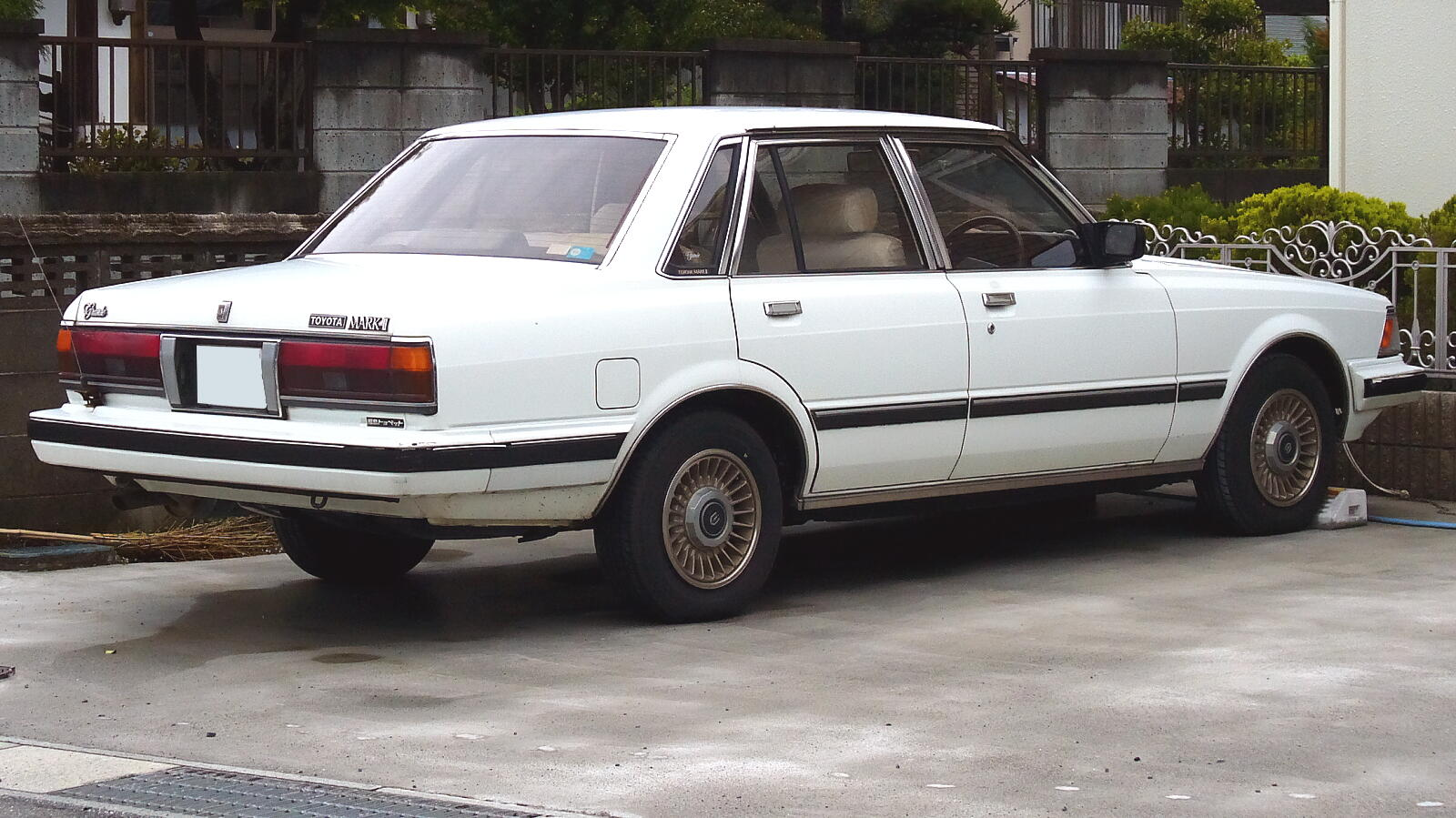
Toyota Mark II Grande sedan (Japan)

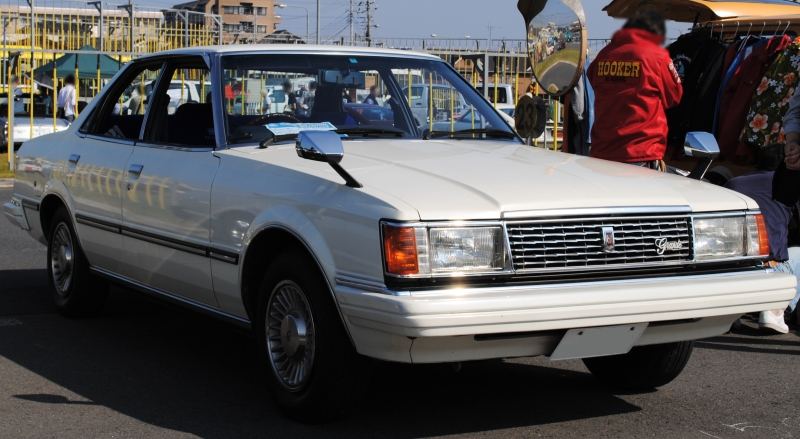
Toyota Mark II Grande Hardtop (Japan)

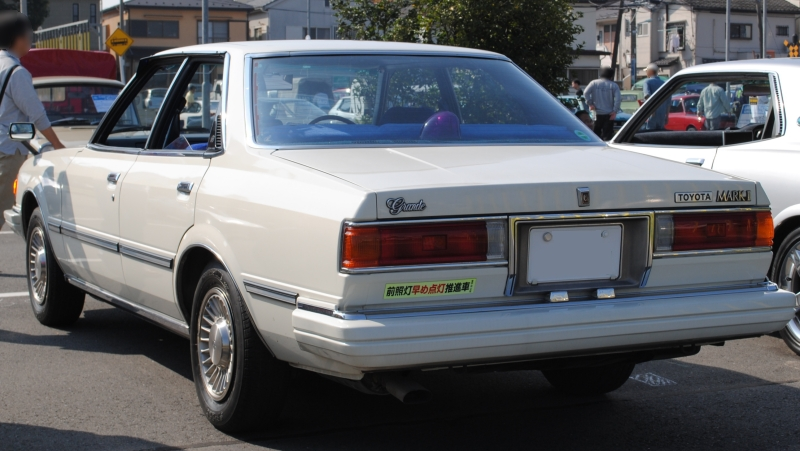
Toyota Mark II Grande Hardtop (Japan)

=== Cressida ===
==== North America ====
The second-generation Cressida, the MX63 (sedans for model years 1983 and 1984 with new IRS, the wagon and solid rear axle model is the MX62), was a significant redesign from the previous generation. Gone was the coupé version, but a more up-to-date body style was new for the sedan and wagon. Changes from the previous generation included a larger engine using electronic fuel injection, now up to 116 hp (87 kW) at 4800 rpm in North American trim. The 5M-E would power the 1981 and 1982 model years before it was superseded by the 5M-GE, a DOHC engine with a substantially higher power rating, 143 hp (107 kW) in 1983 and 1984. North American X60-series Cressidas all received versions of the 2.8-litre inline-six engine, while in other markets smaller units were often available.

Much like the contemporary Camry and Corolla, the US market Cressida had a unique interior that differed from other LHD variants, including those sold in nearby Canada, in order to satisfy American design tastes and certain federal requirements. While other LHD Cressidas had essentially a mirror image of the RHD interior sold in markets like Japan and Australia, the US spec interior had a unique steering wheel, completely different bottom half of the dashboard with more luxurious soft touch materials, and the major addition of the automatic shoulder belts, which were not offered in any other market.

The Cressida was the first car to offer an automatic motorized passive seat belt system, a full year ahead of the legal requirement taking effect. The centre console is also different and includes two levers for both driver and passenger with "LIFT FOR EMERGENCY EXIT" decals that are designed to release the tension in the automatic shoulder belts when they lock up as designed in a collision or panic stop situation. The US-market 1981 Cressida was the first car to come with motorized automatic shoulder harnesses which wrapped around front seat occupants when the door was closed and the ignition switched on. All US-market Cressidas from 1981 on were so equipped.

In 1983, the Cressida was refreshed and gained an independent semi-trailing link rear suspension, rear vented disc brakes, and the 5M-GE engine. Much of this technology came from the Toyota Supra parts bin with minor differences. A five-speed manual transmission was available, but cars equipped with it were considerably more rare than automatic versions. The electronically controlled A43DE automatic transmission was another improvement over the previous hydraulically controlled A43DL transmission and had three modes: Power, Normal, and Economy. This iteration was praised for its handling, ride, quiet interior, and most of all, its reliability; the Cressida was quickly gaining a reputation for outstanding ownership.

In August 1983, Toyota chairman Eiji Toyoda initiated the F1 project ("Flagship" and "No. 1 vehicle"; alternatively called the "Circle-F" project), a clandestine effort aimed at producing a world-class luxury sedan for international markets. This led to the creation of an all new, full size luxury sedan designed for export markets, which ended up becoming the Lexus LS.

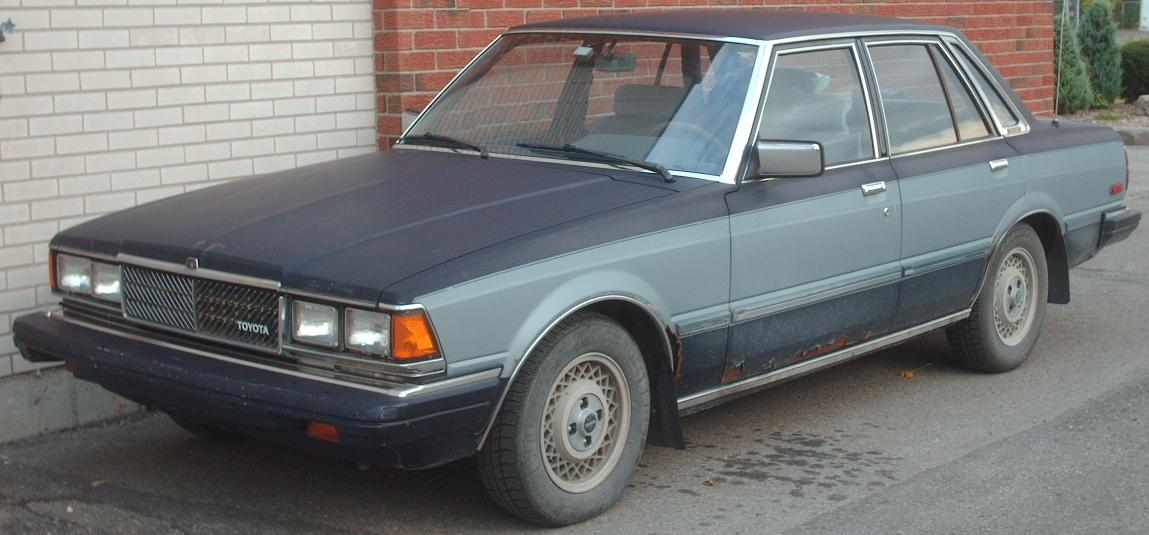
Pre-facelift 1982 Toyota Cressida (MX63, Canada)

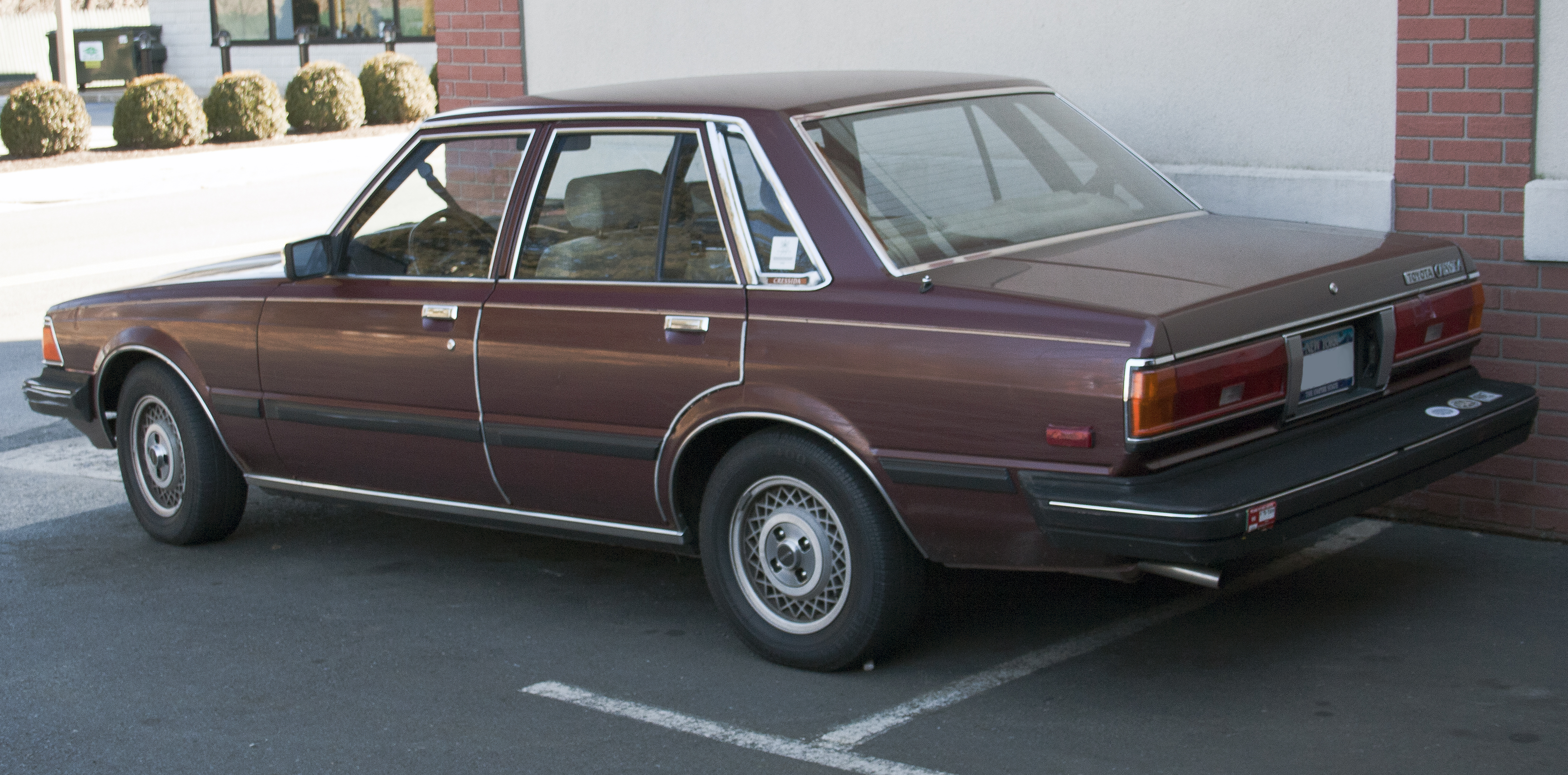
Facelift 1983 Toyota Cressida (MX63, US)

==== Australia and New Zealand ====
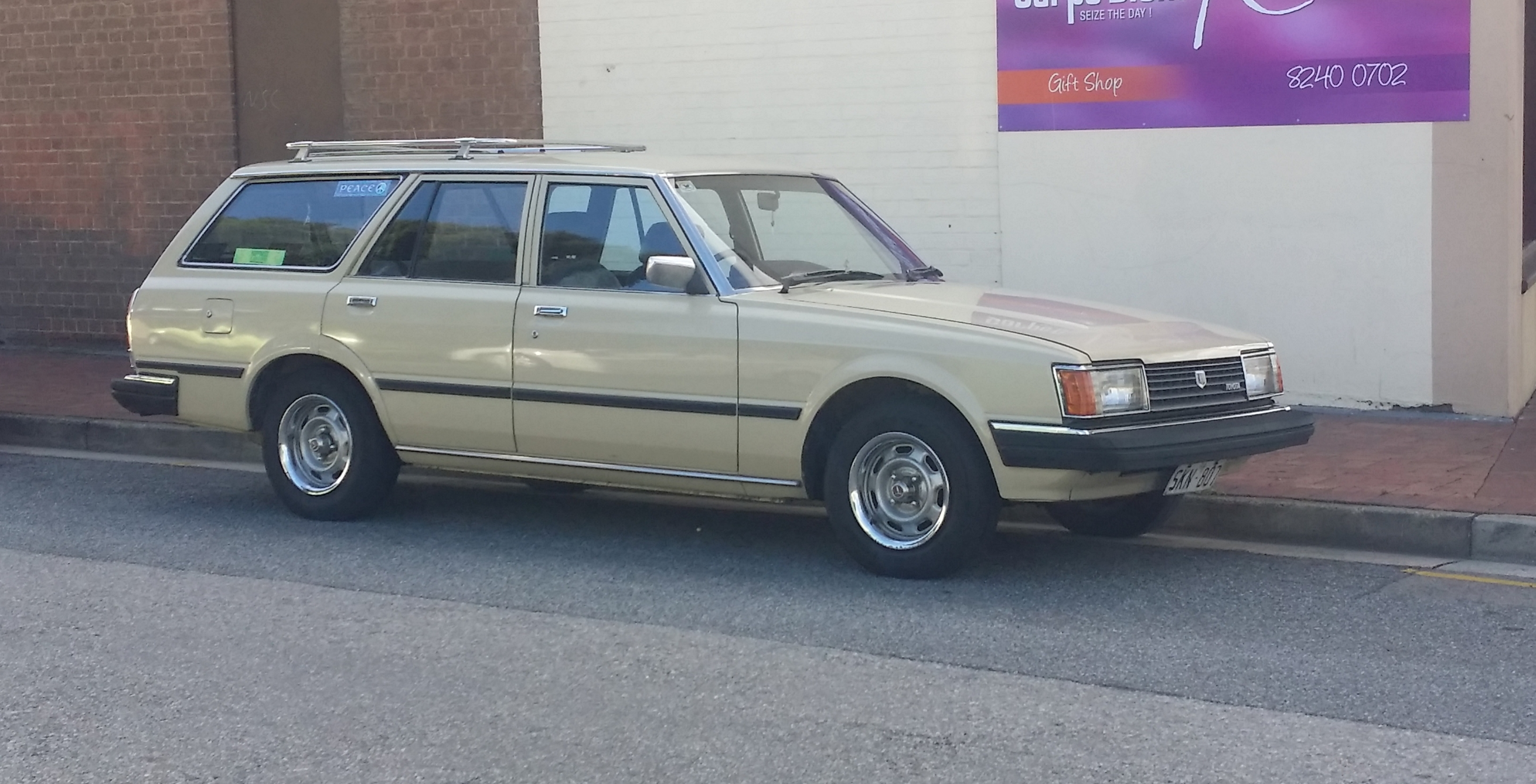
Toyota Cressida DX wagon (Australia)

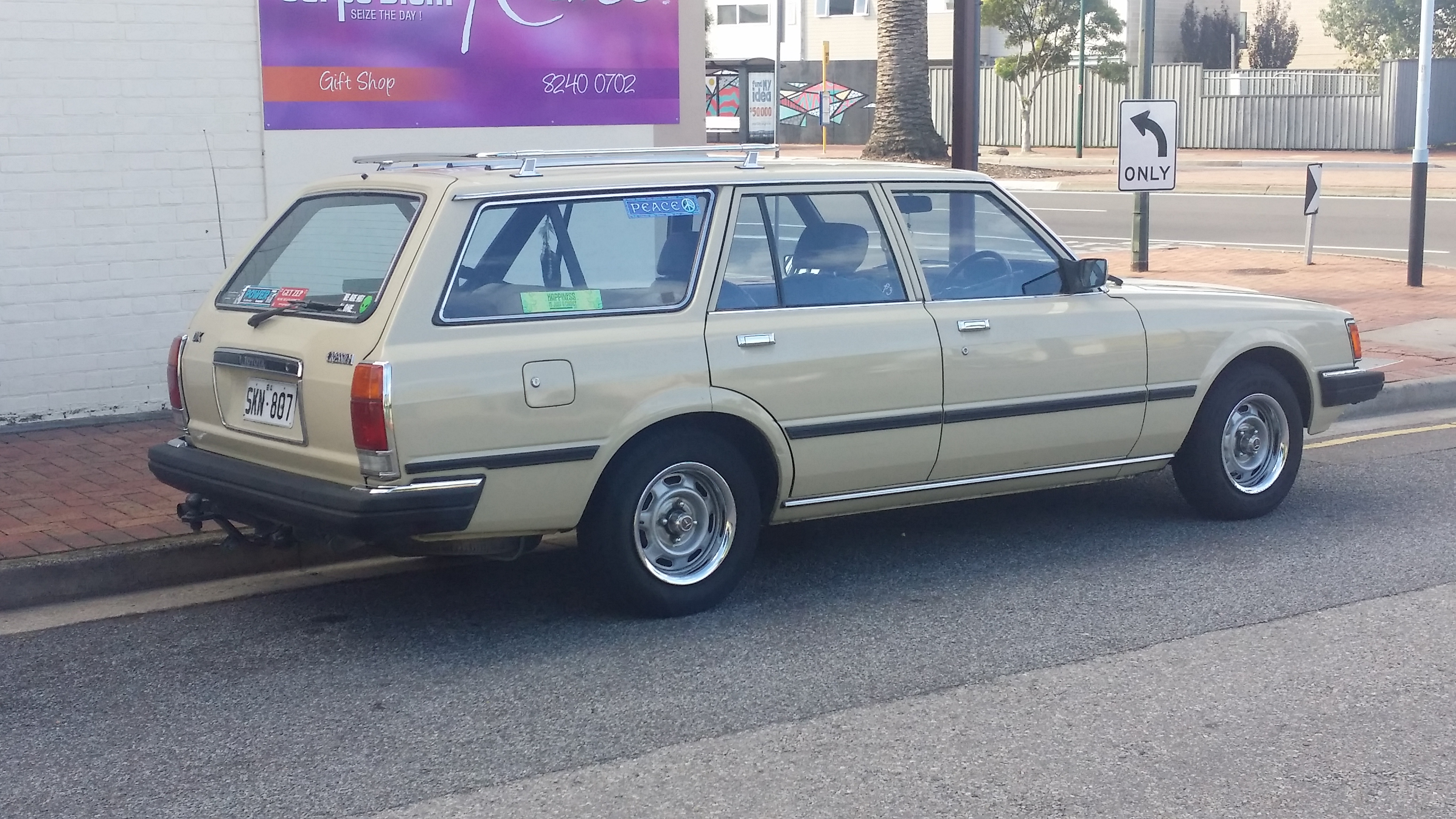
Toyota Cressida DX wagon (Australia)

This model was again assembled in New Zealand initially only with a two-litre, four-cylinder petrol engine and five-speed manual or optional three-speed automatic transmission. Various markets received different bodywork, combining various elements of the Mark II, Chaser, and Cresta variants.

After the mid-generation facelift, a mid-grade specification similar to the original one-model line was offered on New Zealand assembled models with the four-cylinder engine; a new top version had a two-litre six-cylinder engine, four-speed automatic and air conditioning, becoming the first NZ-built Toyota to have 'air' as standard. A large number of the four-cylinder cars with dealer-fitted air conditioning were sold to car hire company Hertz Rent A Car. Both engines were below two litres to avoid the higher sales taxes that applied on larger engines in New Zealand at the time.

==== Europe ====
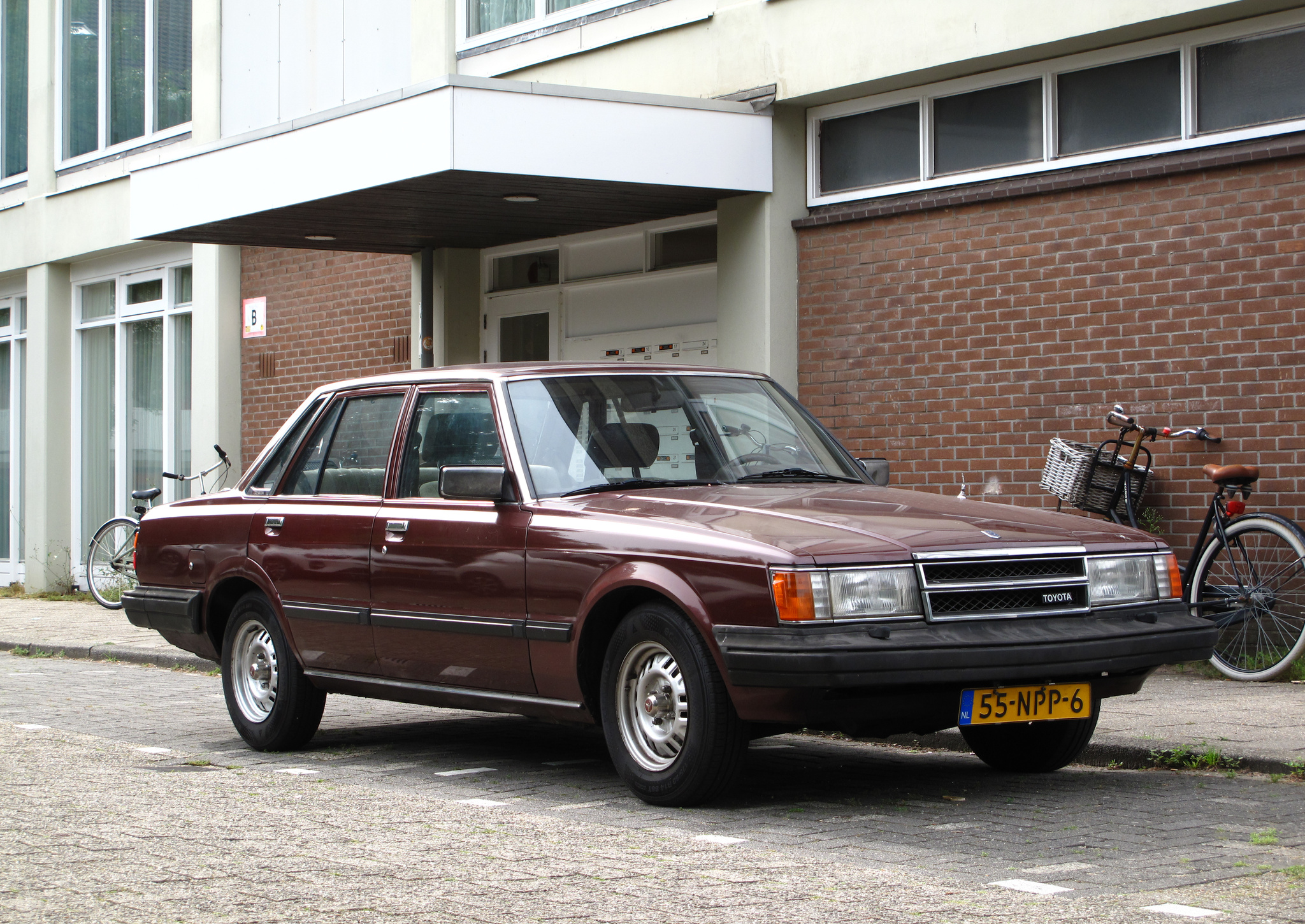
Facelift Toyota Cressida DX 2.2 Diesel (LX60, Europe)

This model was sold as a Cressida in Europe as well, albeit only in a few markets and never in significant numbers. Toyota was withdrawing from the large car categories in Europe at this time, focusing on smaller vehicles. The Crown had been discontinued in many European markets, leaving the Cressida as the biggest Toyota available. European market Cressidas were generally fitted with two-litre inline-fours or -sixes (21R, 1G), and the 2.2-litre L diesel was a popular option in some places. Power outputs, all DIN ratings, are 99 PS (73 kW) at 5200 rpm for the four-cylinder, 101 PS (74 kW) at 5000 rpm for the six-cylinder, and 66 PS (49 kW) at 4200 rpm for the diesel.

The Swedish- and Swiss-specification models have their own emissions controls due to those countries' legislations; its 1972-cc 21R-U engine produces 105 PS (77 kW) at 5200 rpm.

=== Chaser and Cresta ===
Production swapped to the X51 and X61 Chaser in 1980, with the addition of the 6-cylinder 2.0 L 1G-EU (single cam) and 1G-GE (twincam) engines. Body styles offered were a four-door sedan and 4-door hardtop, no longer offering the 2-door hardtop with this generation. The "Avante" trim level had a sport tuned suspension using Michelin tires. This generation saw a new competitor from Nissan called the Leopard with a lower asking price in comparison to the Japanese market favorite, the Skyline.

The all-new Toyota Cresta was introduced in 1980 as a luxurious companion to the Chaser, sharing the chassis, suspension and engines, and was available at Toyota Vista Store locations, while the Mark II remained at Toyopet Store locations.

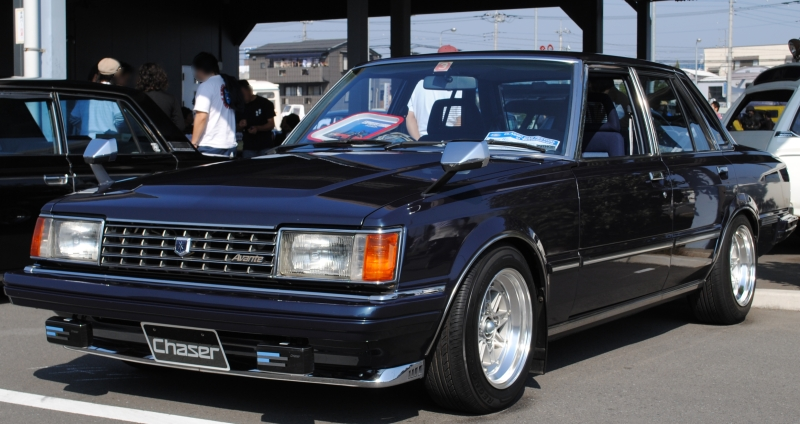
Toyota Chaser Avante sedan (X60)

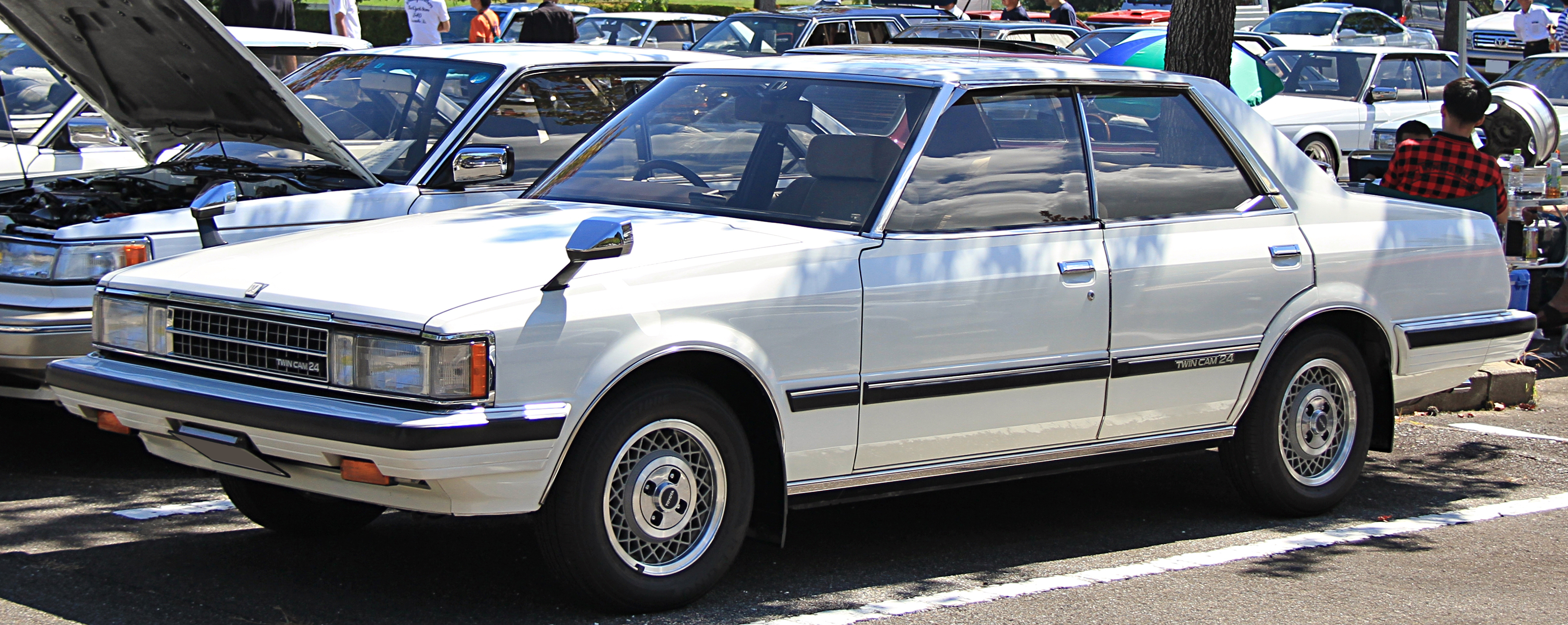
1982–1984 Toyota Cresta Super Lucent Twin Cam (facelift)

== Fifth generation (X70; 1984) ==
Fifth generation
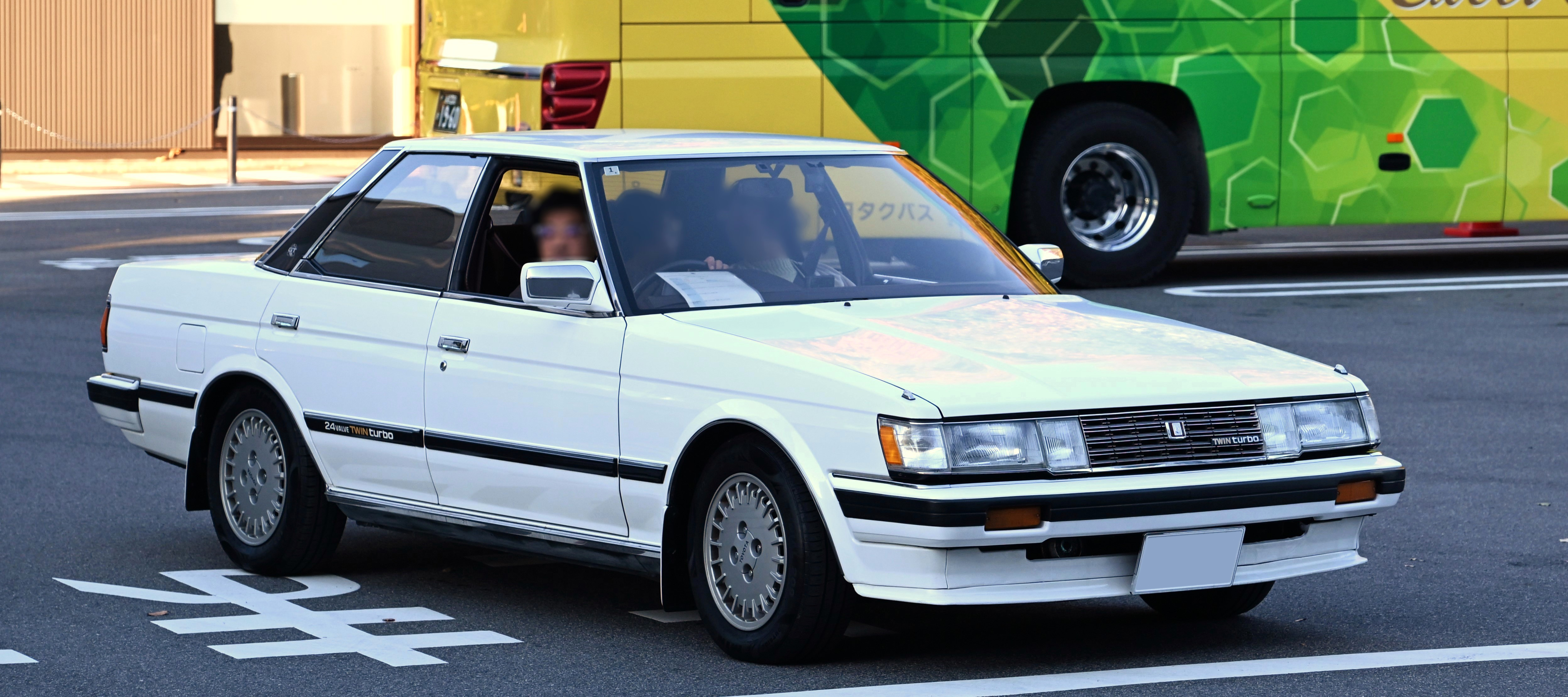
- 1985 Toyota Mark II GT Twin Turbo sedan (Japan)

Overview
- Model code: X70
- Also called: Toyota Cressida
- Production: 1984–1988; 1984–1997 (wagon)
- Assembly: Japan: Toyota, Aichi (Motomachi plant); Indonesia: Jakarta; South Africa: Durban

Body and chassis
- Body style: 4-door sedan; 4-door pillared hardtop sedan; 5-door station wagon
- Related: Toyota Chaser (X70); Toyota Cresta (X70)

Powertrain
- Engine: 1812 cc 2Y-P, 2Y-U/J I4 (YX70/YX76V); 1832 cc 1S I4 (SX70); 1998 cc 3Y-PU, 3Y-E I4 (YX72/YX78V); 1988 cc 1G-E I6 (GX70G/GX71); 1988 cc 1G-GE DOHC I6 (GX71); 1988 cc M-TE turbo I6 (MX71); 1988 cc 1G-GTE twin turbo DOHC I6 (GX71); 2.8 L 5M-E I6 (MX72/73 Cressida); 2.8 L 5M-GE DOHC I6 (MX72/73 Cressida); diesel: 2446 cc 2L diesel I4 (LX70/LX76V); 2446 cc 2L-T TD I4 (LX70)
- Transmission: 4-speed A43DE automatic; 4-speed A340E automatic; 3-speed automatic; 4-speed manual; 5-speed W58 manual

Dimensions
- Wheelbase: 2,660 mm (104.7 in)
- Length: 4,650 mm (183.1 in)
- Width: 1,690 mm (66.5 in)
- Height: 1,415 mm (55.7 in)
- Curb weight: 1,090–1,280 kg (2,403–2,822 lb)

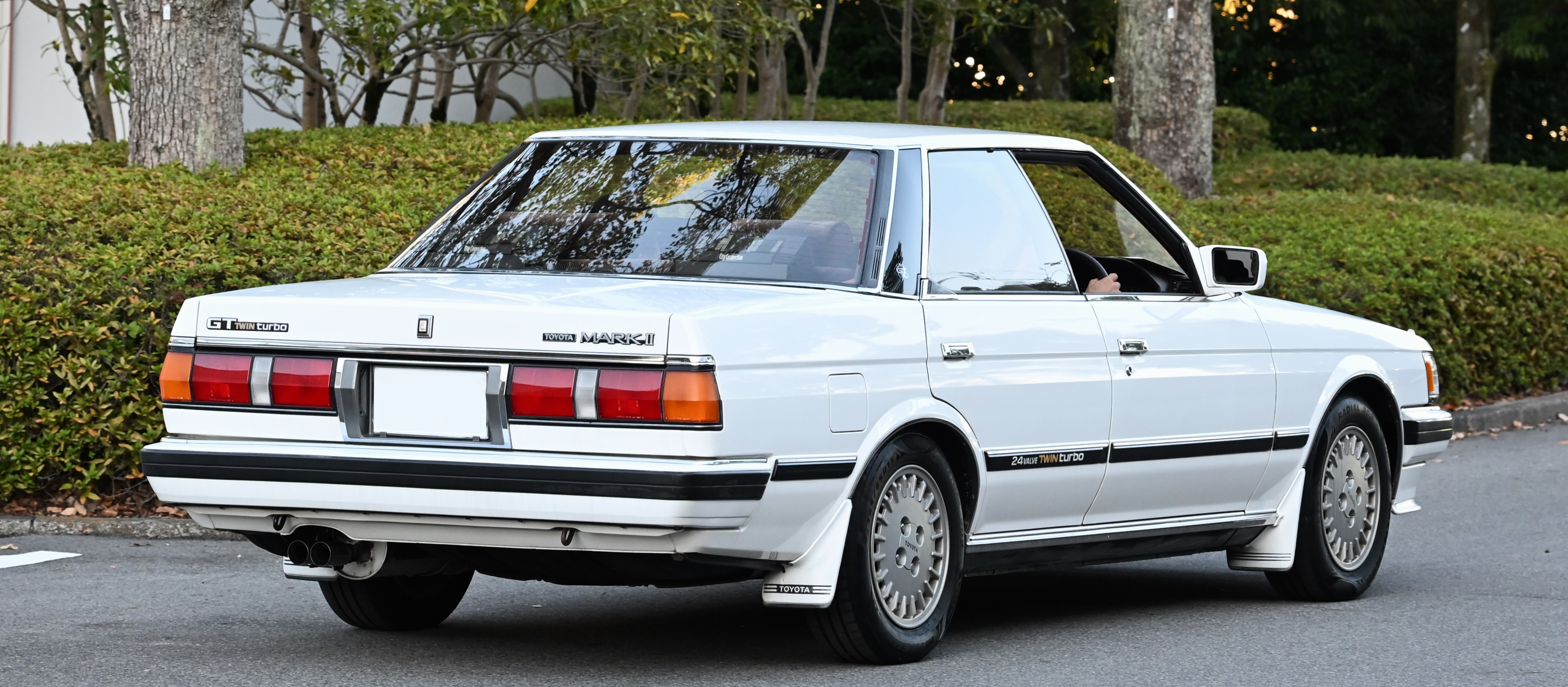
Rear view (sedan)

Arriving in August 1984, the fifth generation dropped the "Corona" name in Japan and became simply the Toyota Mark II. This generation Mark II was now the competitor to the Nissan Bluebird Maxima sedan. As well as for private buyers, the Mark II range also contained models specifically targeting fleet sales, government agencies, and taxi services. In Japan's booming economy of the era, the top-of-the-line models became more and more popular, becoming the best sellers in the range. The accompanying Chaser and Cresta sedans, as well as the export-market Cressida, were also upgraded to the X70-series.

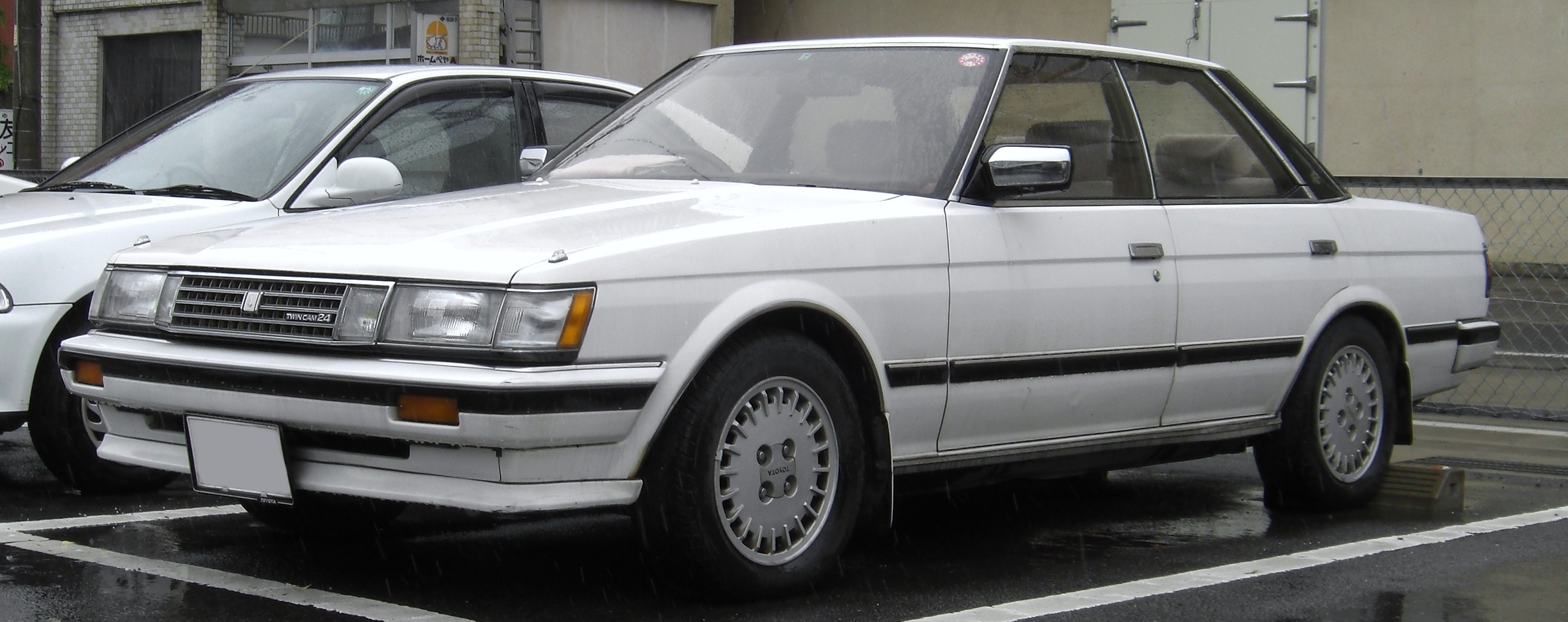

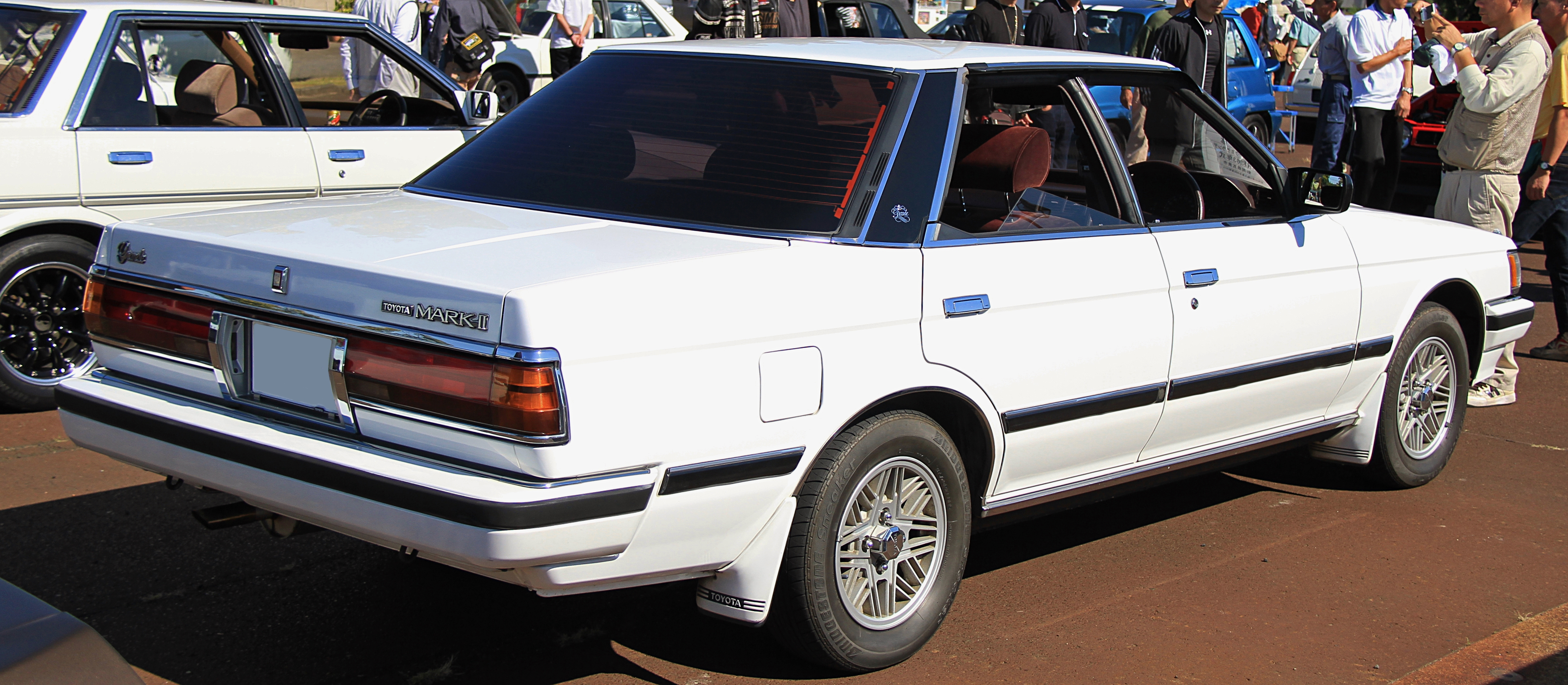
Toyota Mark II hardtop (GX71)

The Mark II has two different variations: the pillared Hardtop and the Sedan. Visually, they are different on the exterior while the interior remains untouched. Exterior changes on the Hardtop version include a slanted nose, which requires a new grille, a thinner headlamp assembly that matches the slanted nose, frameless door windows, a thinner tail lamp, front fenders, and a bumper. Body panel is stamped different from the standard version. The Standard version is exactly like the MX73 Toyota Cressida. It does not have the aggressive slanted front end, conservative body panels and framed windows.

The Mark II (and its sister cars) received the powerful Twin Turbo version of the 1G inline-six in October 1985. This 185 PS (136 kW; 182 hp) engine made the earlier turbocharged M-TE engine superfluous and it was discontinued. In August 1986 the range received a minor facelift and some technical improvements. The 1.8-litre LPG engine was replaced by a 2-litre version. In December 1986, two special editions appeared: the well-equipped 1800 GR Saloon (power-folding door mirrors, power door locks and windows, and so on) and the Hardtop Grande Twin Cam 24 Limited (very well equipped, only available with the four-speed automatic).

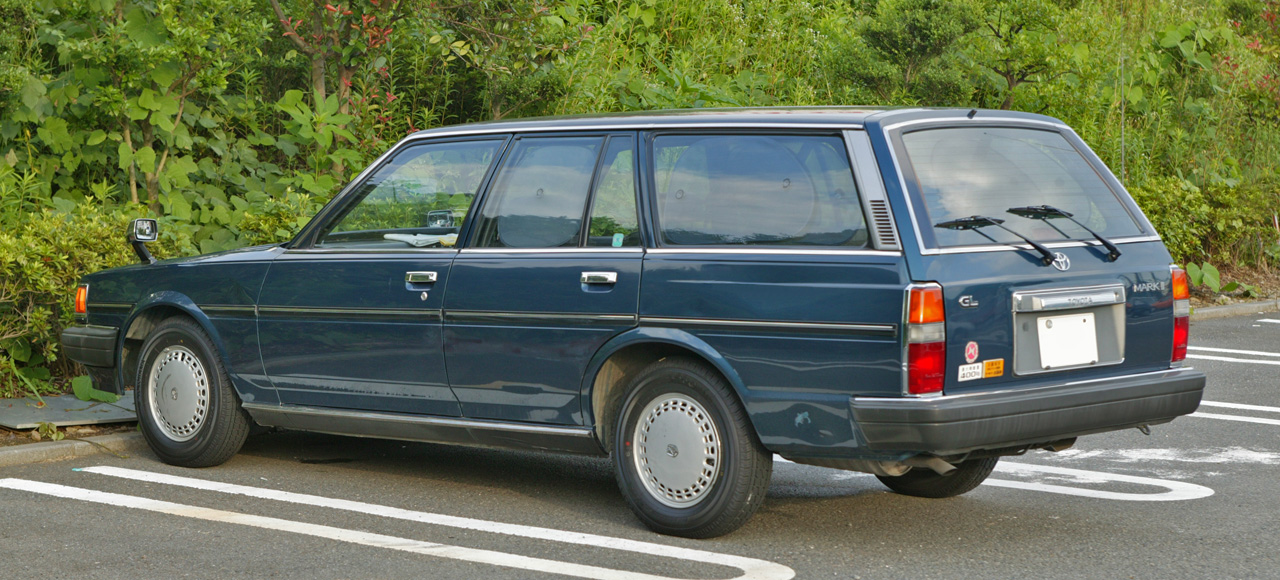
Toyota Mark II Van 2.0 (YX78V)

=== Station wagon/van (1984–1997) ===
The X70 station wagon was produced from November 1984 to April 1997 with only a few minor revisions over the years. In most markets, sales of this wagon was stopped when the next model of the sedan was introduced but they continued to be sold in Japan for use as delivery vehicles. It was finally superseded by the front-wheel-drive Mark II Qualis that was based on the Camry Gracia.

=== Cressida ===
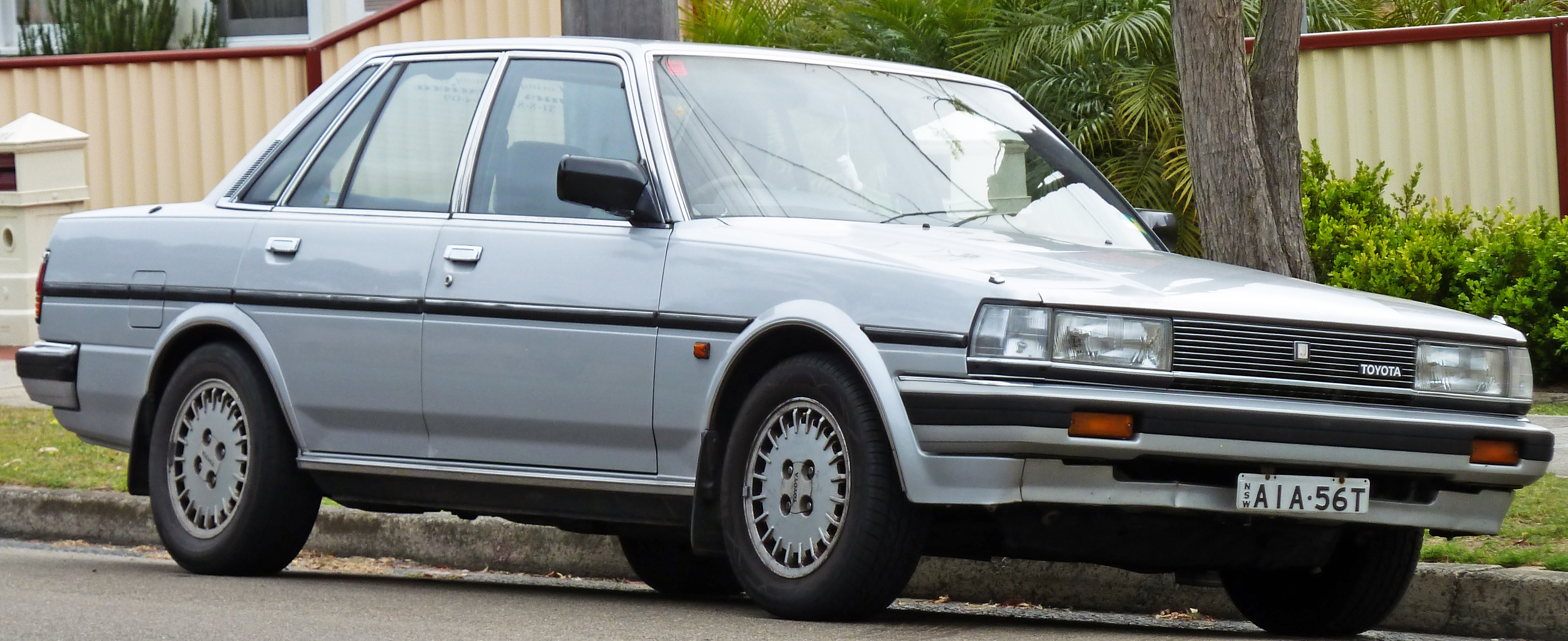

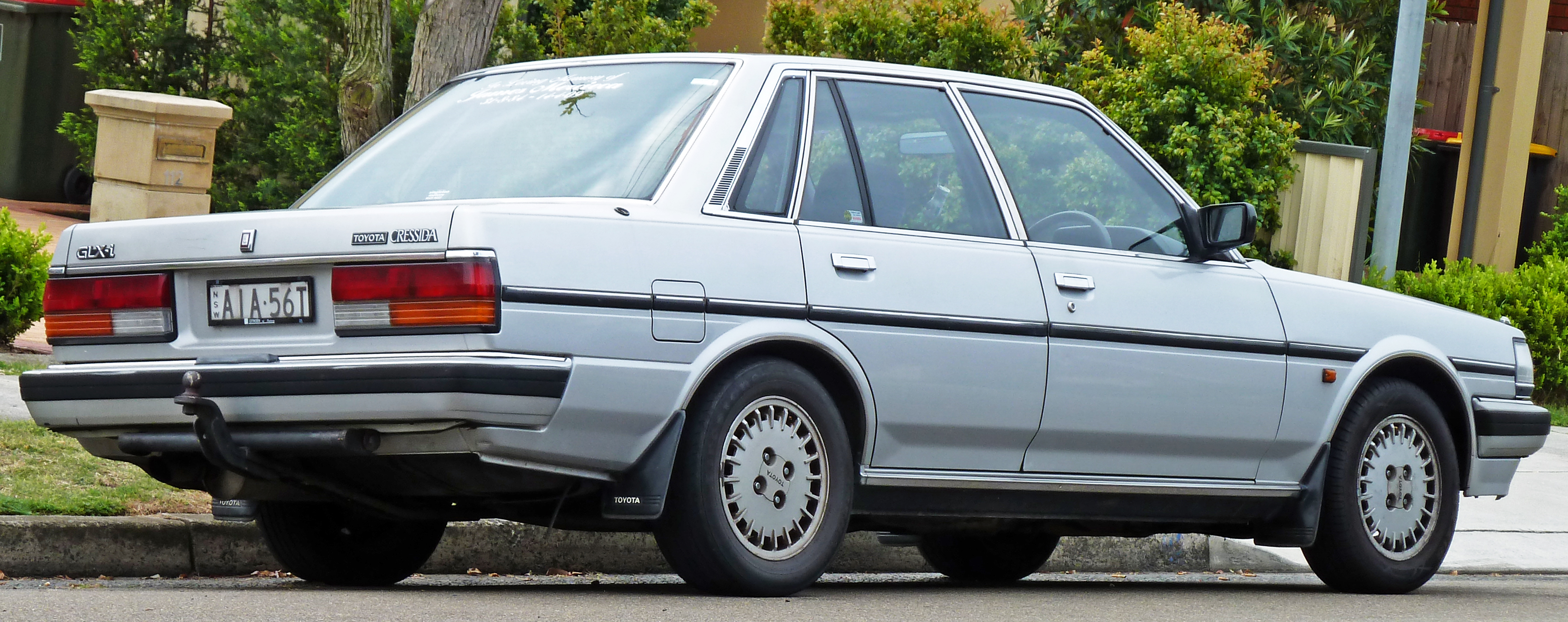
Toyota Cressida GLX-i sedan (MX73; Australia)

In 1984 for the 1985 model year, a new Cressida was introduced by Toyota. This was the MX73 (MX72 for wagon). The 5M-E engine was mostly unchanged from the 1984 model year but gained a knock-sensor, which detected pre-ignition and adjusted timing accordingly when a lower-grade fuel was used. Later, the twin-cam 5M-GE engine replaced the 5M-E. The bodystyle was all-new, larger, and more aerodynamic than previous generations. Like its main competitor at the time, the Nissan Maxima, it was given the "compact" designation, though it had grown in size. New options included were an electronic shock absorber control (TEMS), CD player, super monitor, digital gauges, standard woodgrain trim, and secondary radio controls that were placed right by the steering wheel for easier access while driving. The Cressida was offered with the W58 five-speed manual transmission, but was very uncommon and only in the 1986 model.

The US-spec Cressida continued to offer a unique interior that differed from other LHD markets, including Canada. The major difference was the automatic shoulder belts, along with unique steering wheel, and different dashboard design.

The automatic transmission retained its "normal/power" selector as many other Toyotas would, but later in production, the "economy" selection was dropped. In 1987 the automatic transmission was changed to the A340E that was also used with the 7M-GE and Lexus 1UZ-FE engine at the time. The 1988 model was not offered with a manual transmission and the wagon was discontinued in 1987. By 1988, power output was at 161 hp (120 kW).

Cressida badging was also used in other export markets with smaller engines. In Indonesia, the Cressida GLX-i was available with a 109 PS (80 kW) version of the two-litre 1G-E 6-cylinder engine with no emissions controls and low compression suitable for lower-octane petrol. Cressidas sold in Europe had limited engine options, including the 2.4-litre turbodiesel engine with 86 PS (63 kW).

== Sixth generation (X80; 1988) ==
Sixth generation
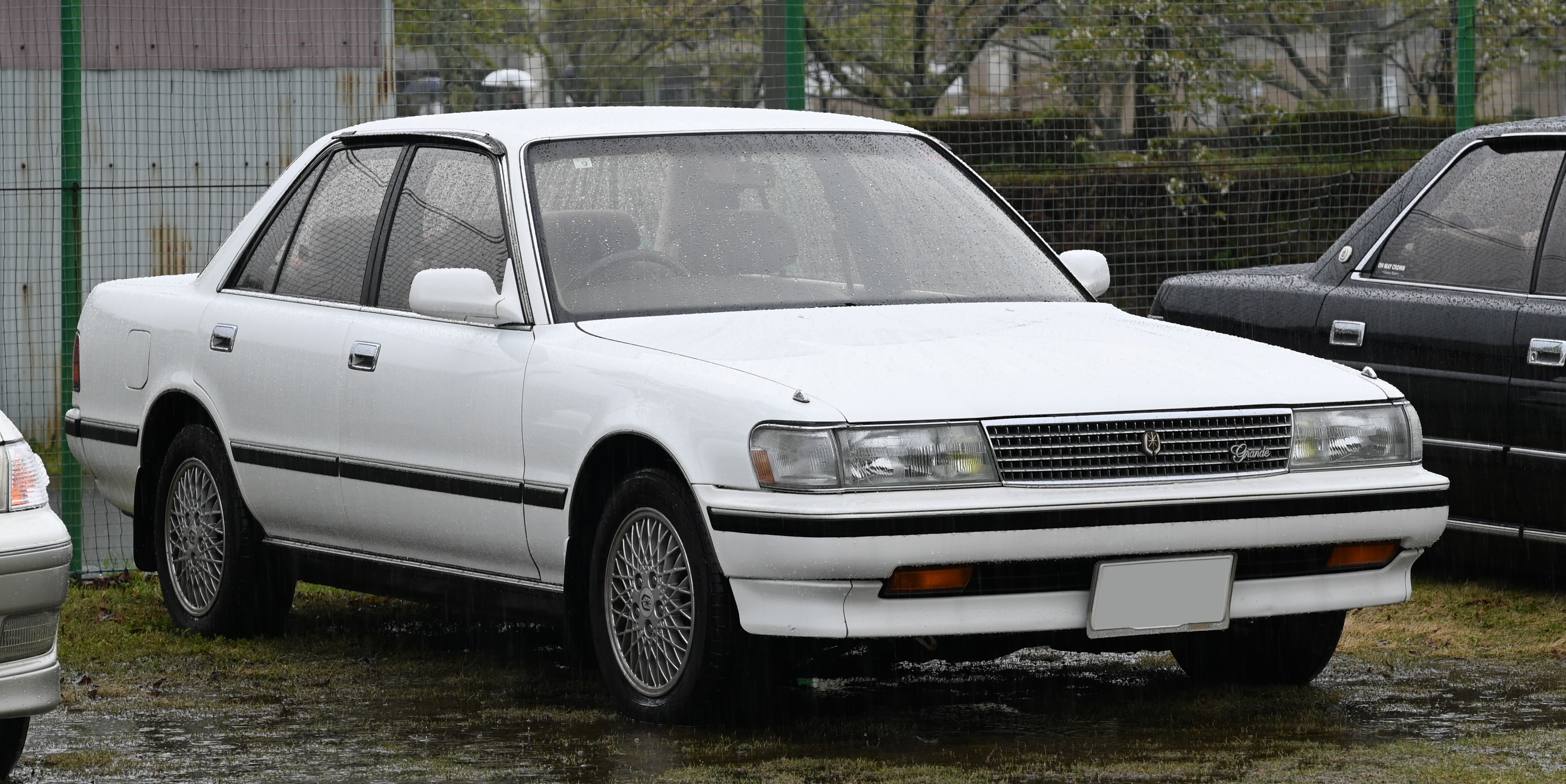
- 1988 Toyota Mark II Grande (GX80, Japan)

Overview
- Model code: X80
- Also called: Toyota Cressida
- Production: 1988–1995
- Assembly: Japan: Toyota, Aichi (Motomachi plant)
- Designer: Tadayoshi Watanabe (1986)

Body and chassis
- Body style: 4-door sedan; 4-door pillared hardtop sedan
- Related: Toyota Cresta (X80); Toyota Chaser (X80); Toyota Comfort

Powertrain
- Engine: petrol: 1.8 L 4S-Fi I4; 2.4 L 22R I4; 2.0 L 1G-FE I6 (GX81); 2.0 L 1G-GE I6; 2.0 L 1G-GZE SC I6; 2.0 L 1G-GTE twin-turbo I6; 2.5 L 1JZ-GE I6 (JZX81); 2.5 L 1JZ-GTE twin-turbo I6; 2.8 L 5M-E I6 (MX81); 3.0 L 7M-GE I6 (MX83); diesel: 2.4 L 2L-T turbo I4
- Transmission: 5-speed W57 W58; 4-speed A340E A341E automatic

Dimensions
- Wheelbase: 2,682 mm (105.6 in)
- Length: 4,690 mm (184.6 in)
- Width: 1,695 mm (66.7 in)
- Height: 1,375 mm (54.1 in)
- Curb weight: 1,170–1,480 kg (2,579–3,263 lb)

Chronology
- Successor: Toyota Avalon (XX10) (North America); Toyota Vienta (XV10) (Australia)

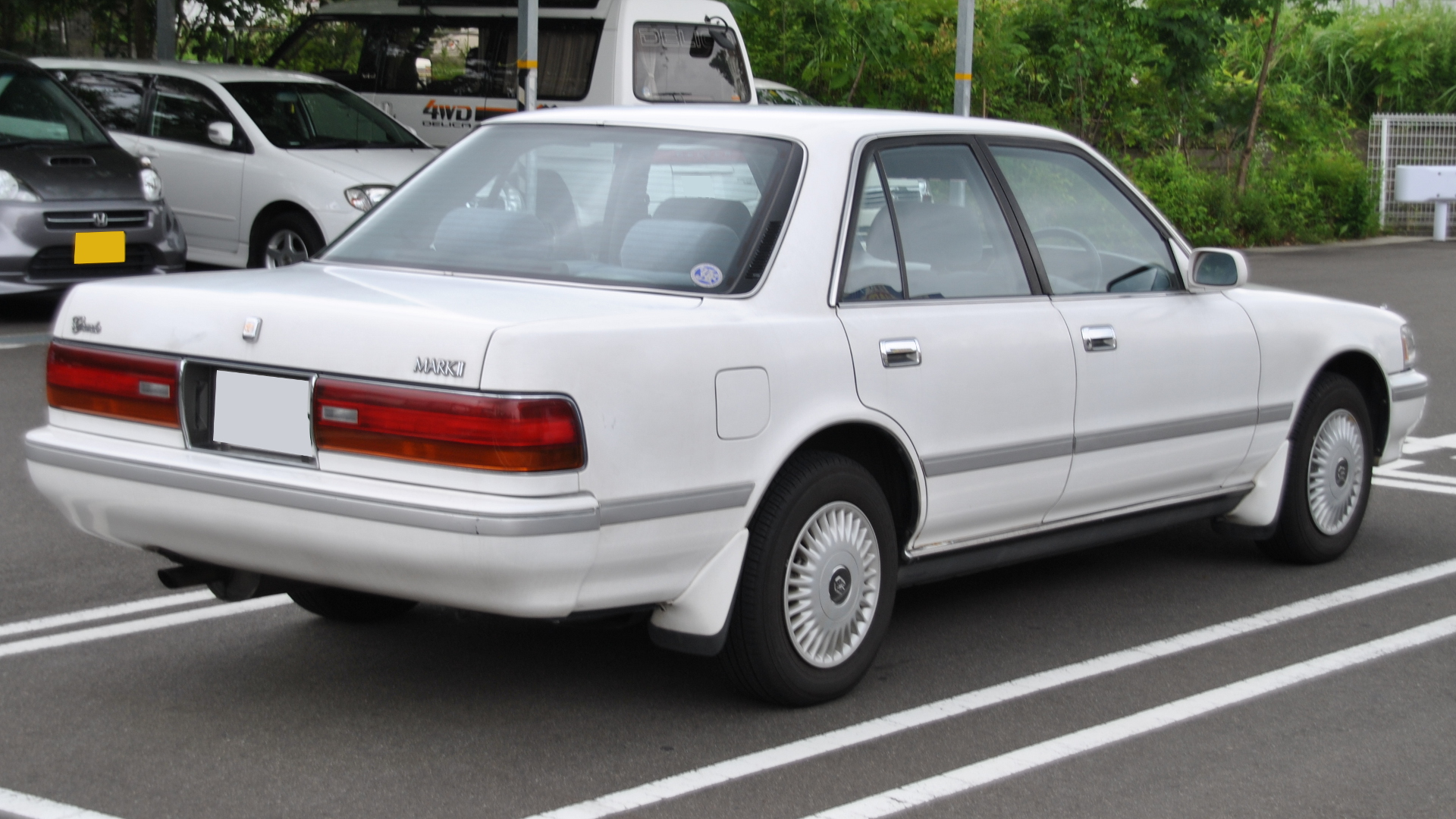
Rear view (sedan)

First released in August 1988, the Mark II was no longer the top level sedan at Toyopet Store locations in Japan with the introduction of the Toyota Celsior in October 1989. The Mark II was offered for private purchase ownership with luxury features on upper trim packages while the Celsior was positioned as a Crown alternative for chauffeur-driven ownership.

The Grande G series used the 3.0 L 7M-GE engine, and featured traction control and ABS, and offered two variants. The base variant "2.0 Grande G" included a supercharger equipped 2.0 L 1G-GZE straight six engine, while the "3.0 Grande G" included the 3.0 L 7M-GE straight six shared with the Soarer. The supercharger was belt-driven but actuated by an electromagnetic clutch so that it would not be driven except when needed, increasing fuel economy. In 1990, 1JZ-GE and 1JZ-GTE (280 PS) was introduced, replacing the 1G-GZE. The GT model was only available with an automatic transmission. All six-cylinder X80 models used independent rear suspension partnered with available TEMS, while the four-cylinder models had solid rear axles.

After 1992, the X80 series continued to be produced for taxi fleet vehicles until 1995, when the Comfort assumed taxi duties. The Comfort was released on 19 December 1995, as a fleet-oriented replacement for the X80 series Mark II in Hong Kong, Indonesia, Japan, Macau and Singapore. Based on the X80 chassis, the Comfort featured a new body design for increased interior space.

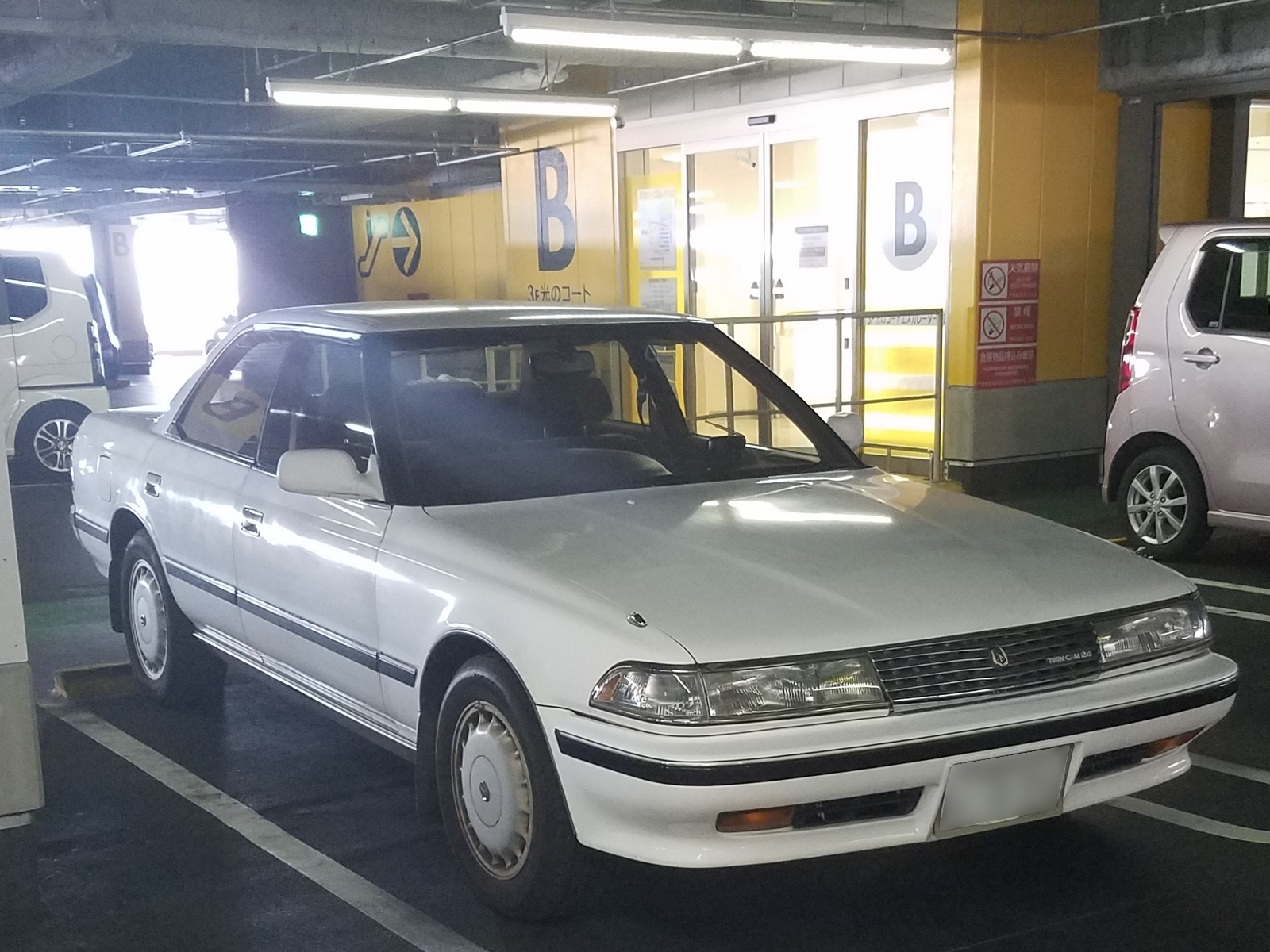
Toyota Mark II Hardtop Grande (GX81, pre-facelift)

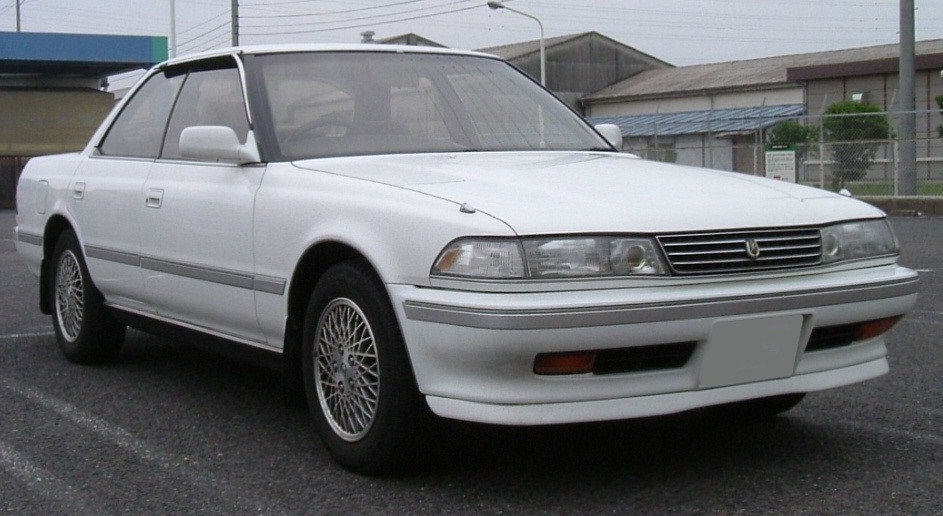
1990 Facelifted Toyota Mark II Hardtop 2.0 Grande Limited, featuring a revised grille

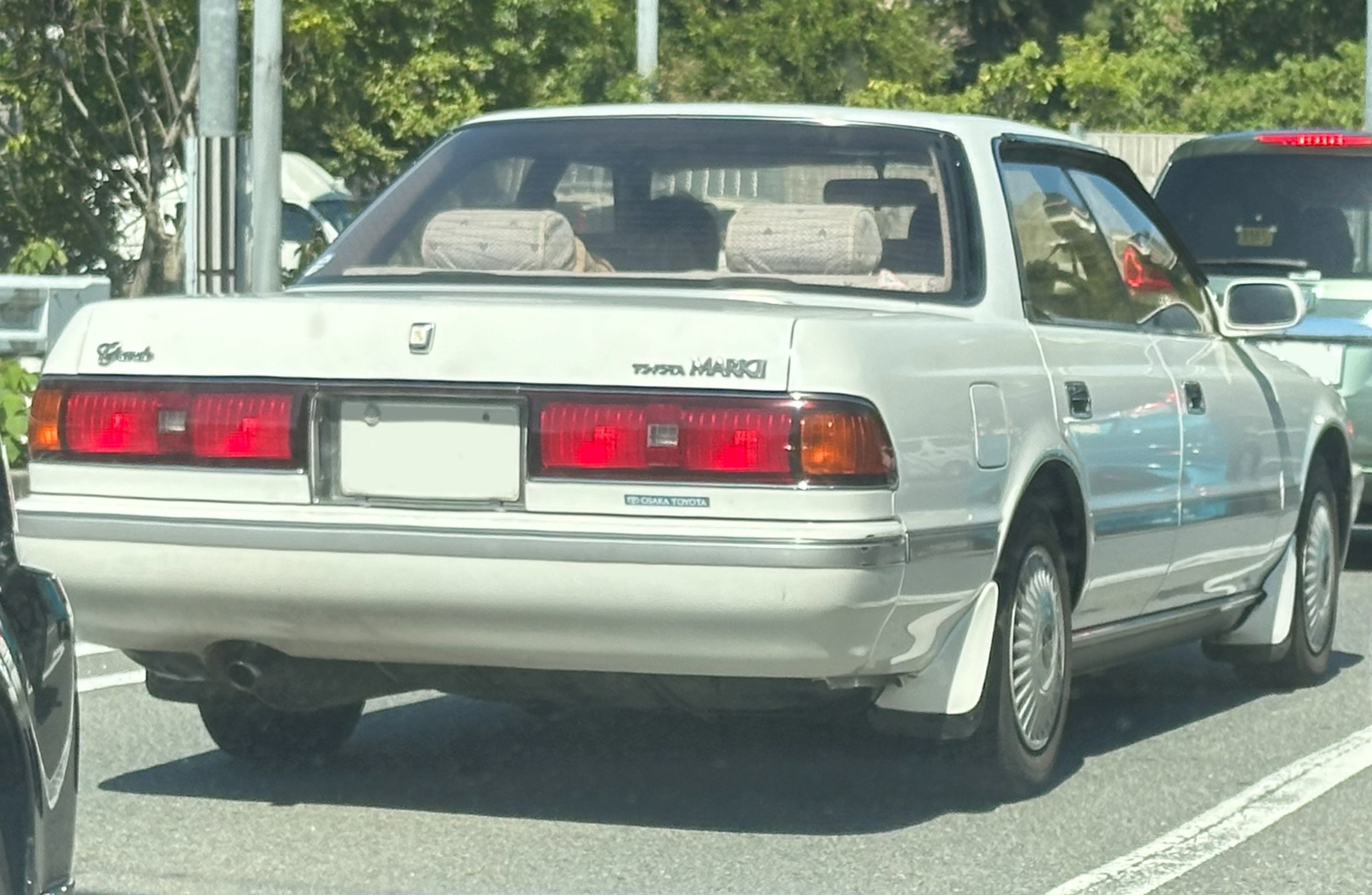
Toyota Mark II Hardtop Grande (GX81, Japan)

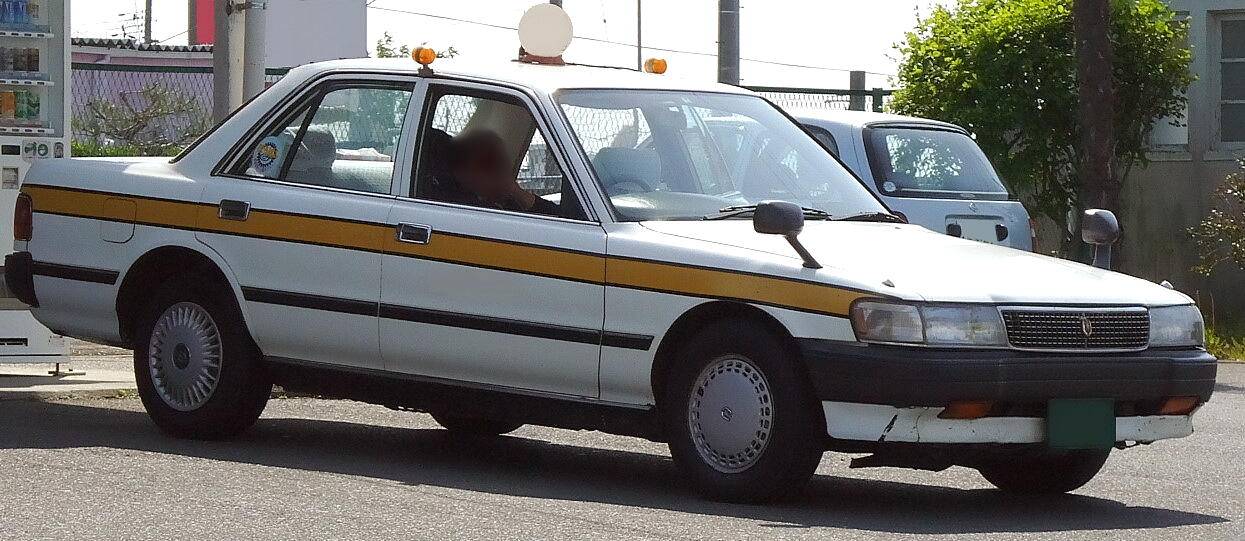
1990 Toyota Mark II sedan (fleet model)

=== Cressida ===
Toyota introduced the slightly larger fourth generation of the Cressida, the MX83, in 1988 for the 1989 model year – the final generation for the Cressida in North America.

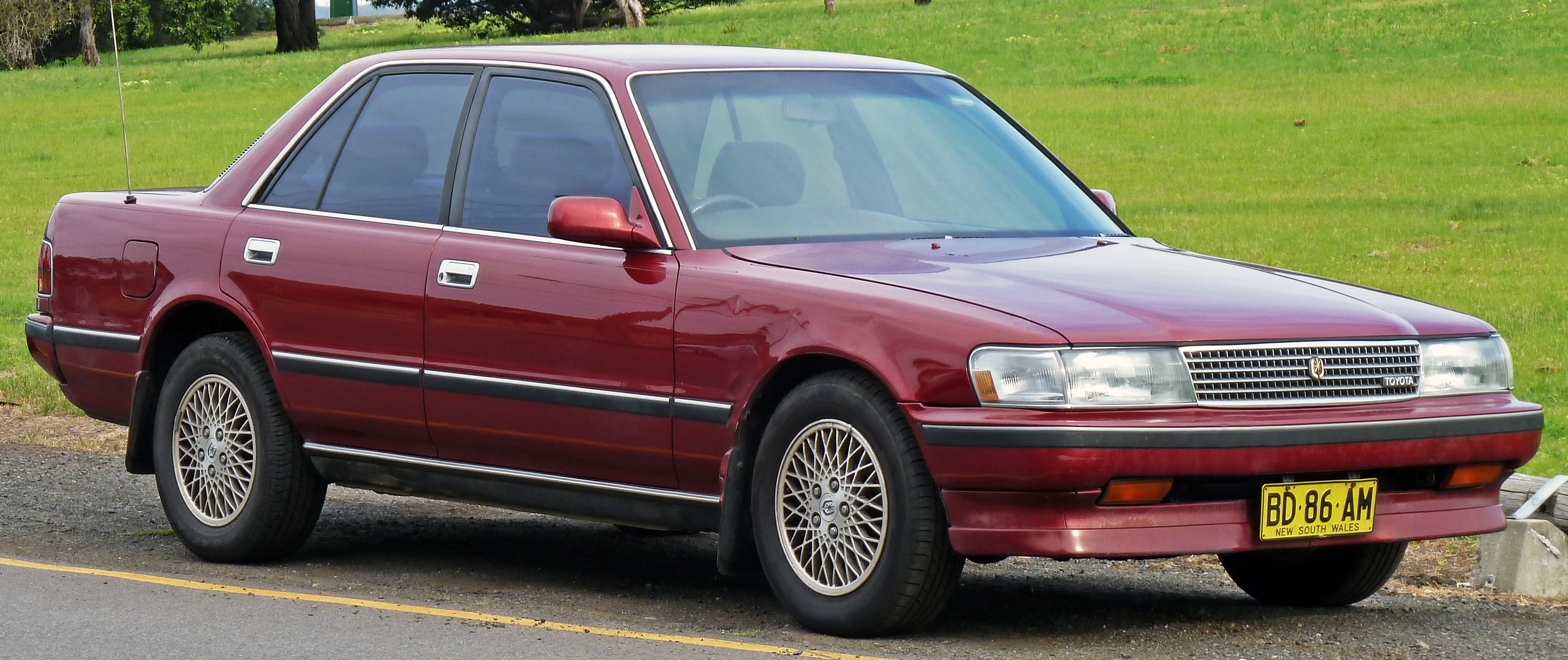

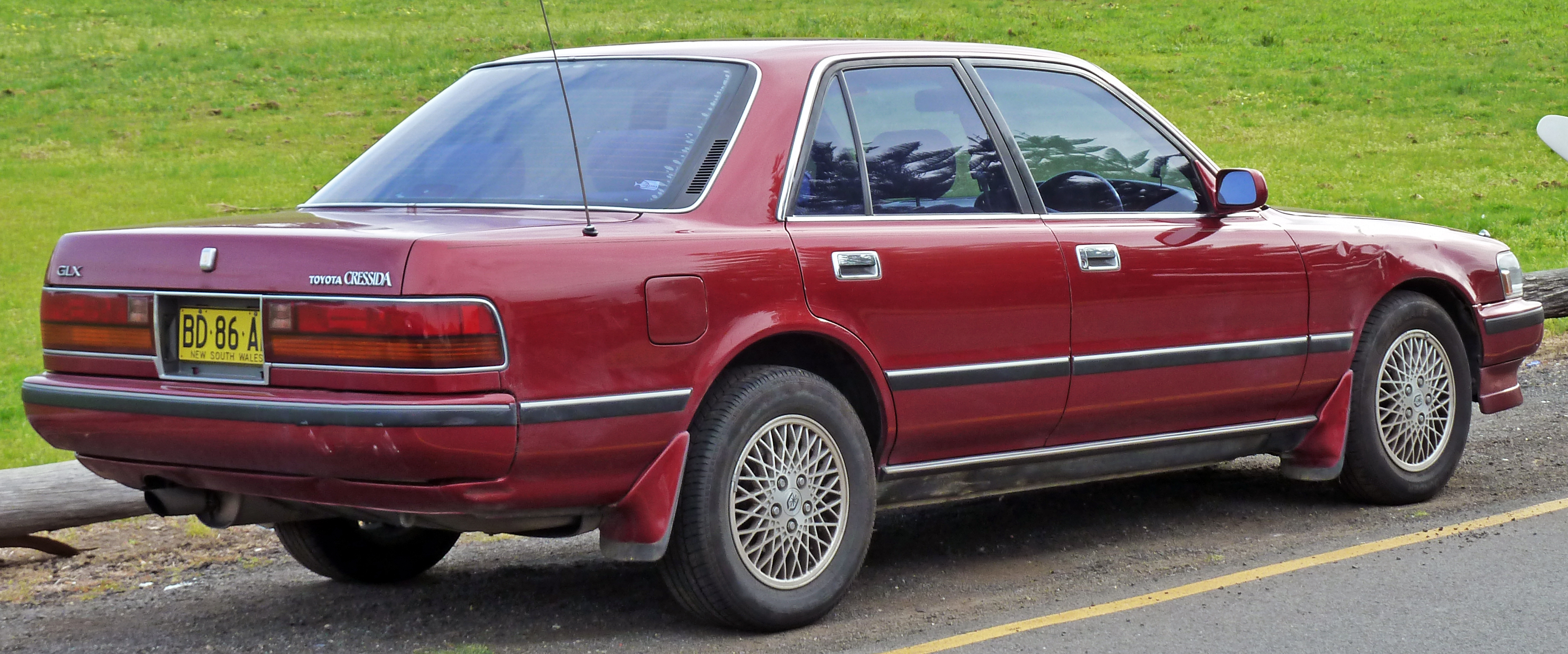
1988–1990 Toyota Cressida GLX (Australia)

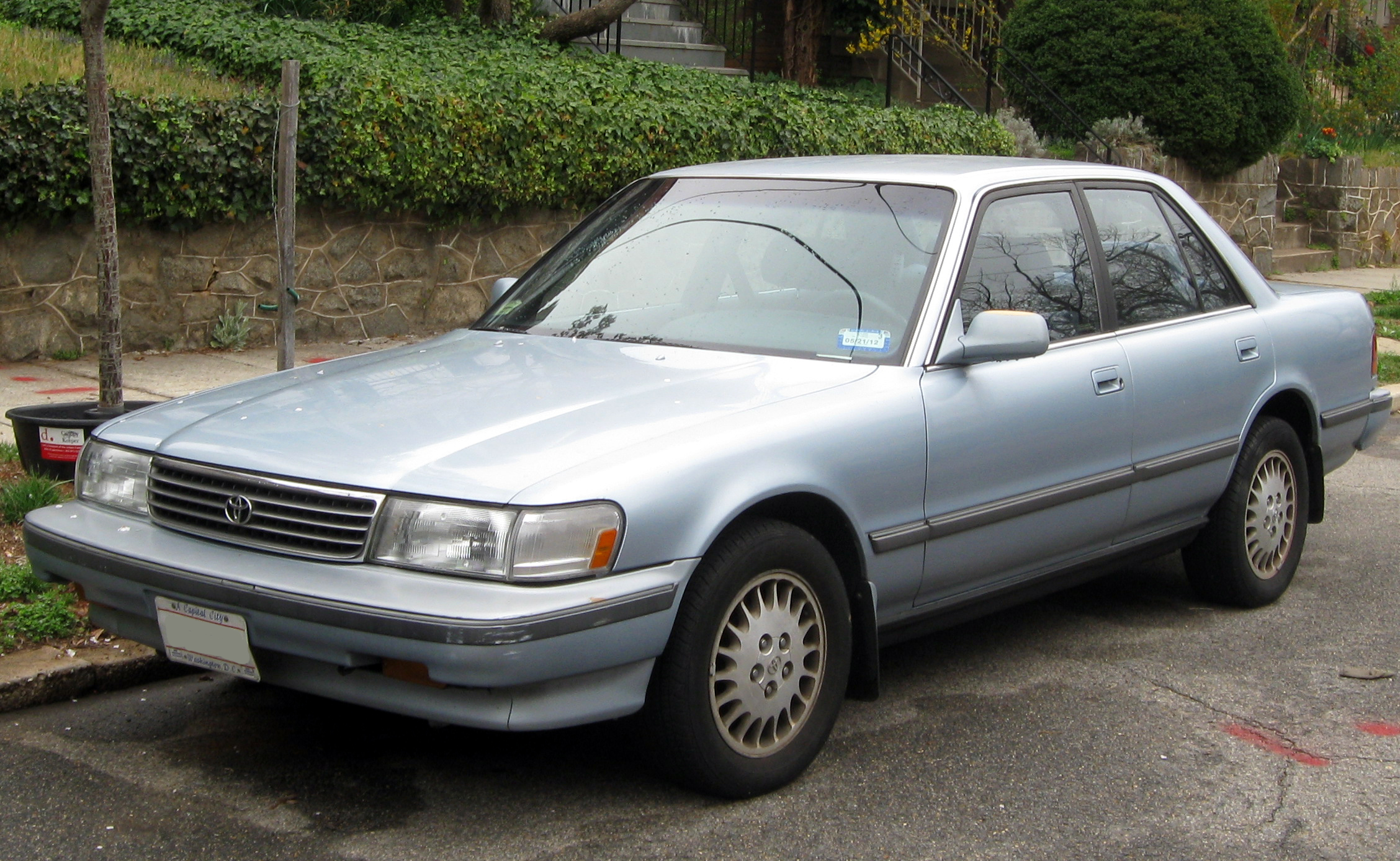
1990–1992 Toyota Cressida (US)

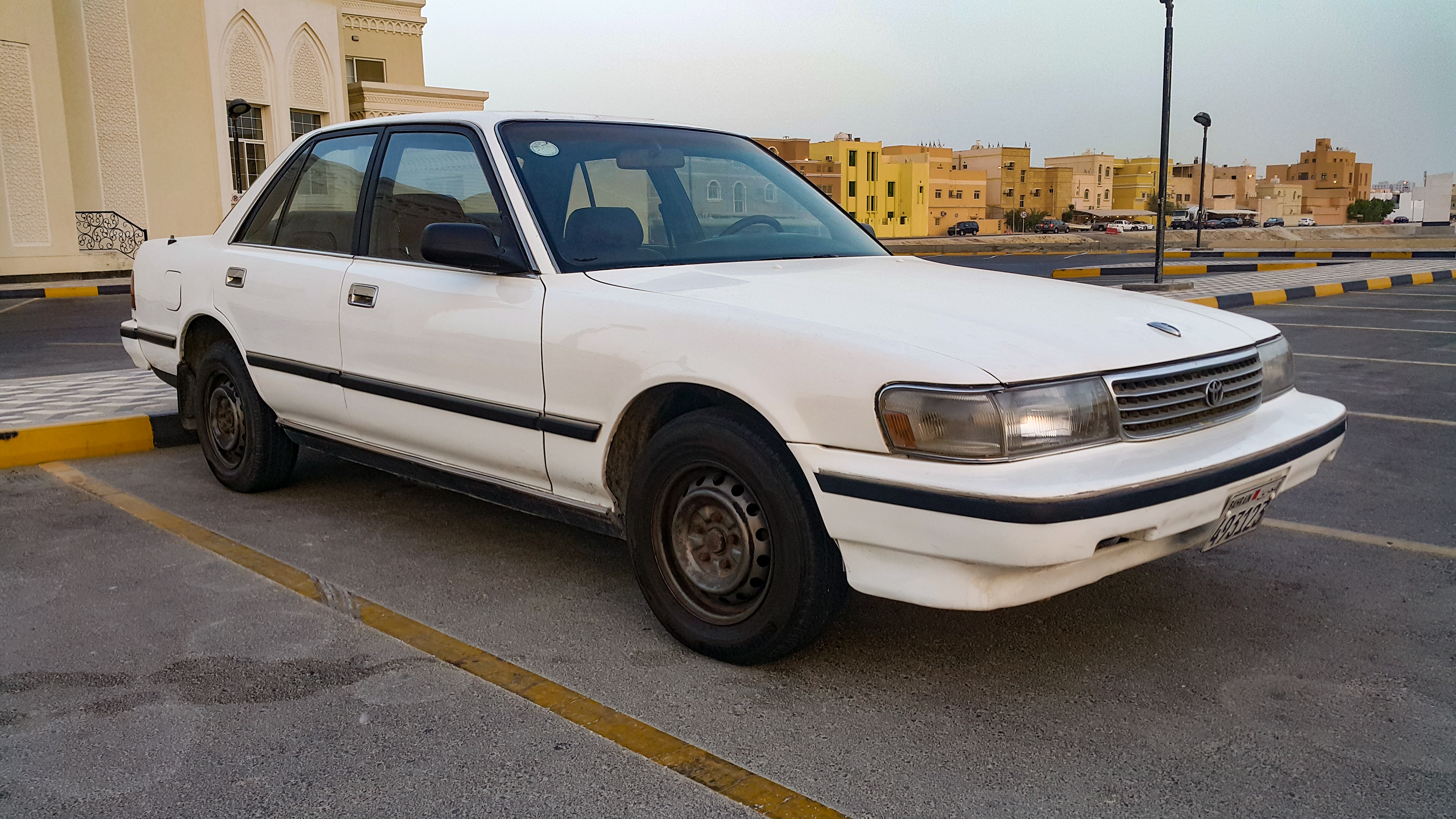
1991–1996 Toyota Cressida GL (Bahrain)

Standard features included a new, more powerful 3.0-litre straight six 7M-GE engine producing 190 hp (142 kW) at 6,000 rpm and 185 lb⋅ft (251 N⋅m) at 4,400 rpm. As with the powertrain, most other mechanicals were modified versions of those in the Supra, most notably the new double-wishbone rear suspension. Standard equipment included power windows and locks, cruise control, a tilt-telescoping steering wheel, and a four-speed automatic transmission. Options included antilock brakes, a power driver's seat, leather upholstery, power moonroof, and a CD player. Cressidas of this generation sold in the US featured motorized automatic seat belts (Canada and other markets had manual seat belts); airbags were never offered.

The Cressida was praised for its ride, handling, fuel mileage for its class (23 mpg [US] average according to a July 1989 Consumer Reports test), and reliability. Downsides include a somewhat uncomfortable back seat, ride quality that deteriorated with a full load of passengers, and a boot with only 12.5 cubic feet of space.

The most substantive change was the 1990 facelift for the 1991 model year, which brought brighter alloy wheels, a redesigned grille containing the new Toyota "T" logo, and simplified climate controls.

In the Middle East, the Cressida came with two engines: a 2.4-litre 22R engine producing 108 hp (81 kW) at 6,000 rpm or a 2.8-litre 5M-E, which produced 103 kW (140 PS; 138 hp) at 4,800 rpm and 226 N⋅m (167 lbf⋅ft) at 3,600 rpm, both running on leaded petrol available in the region at the time. Both the 4-speed auto and a 5-speed manual were available throughout the entire run. Trims includes the "XL", "GL", "GLX" (or "GTX" depending on the market) and "Grande", though trim availability differs between markets. Initially, both XL and GL could be had with a solid rear axle suspension instead of double wishbones but that option was dropped with the facelift in late 1990 for the 1991 model year. The 5M-E was discontinued after the 1992 model year, dropping the Grande and GLX/GTX trim in the process. At its peak, the Cressida was so popular in the Middle East that almost every five in 10 cars was a Cressida. This was popular as both a taxi and with private buyers alike due to its immense reliability, tough body panels, cheap spare parts and relatively comfortable ride. The Cressida was sold until the 1996 model year in the Middle East with the Camry positioned as the successor (the Camry itself was introduced in late 1992).

In Australia, the Cressida was sold from April 1977 to February 1993, when it was replaced by the Vienta (and later the Avalon in the full-size bracket).

The Cressida also played a part in the design of the first Lexus models, most closely resembling the LS 400. However, some of the shared concepts and similarity between the Cressida and early Lexus models in turn led to the decision to eventually discontinue the Cressida in most markets, as it would overlap with vehicles sold under the Lexus marque. The 1992 redesign of the Camry and introduction of the XLE V6 model helped cover the Cressida's market as well, despite the fact it was a more economy-oriented and front-wheel-drive vehicle, while the Cressida was high-end and rear-wheel-drive.

The introduction of the Toyota Avalon in the American market in 1995 filled some of the gap left by the cancellation of the Toyota Cressida after the 1992 model year. The larger Avalon was a front-wheel drive full-size car, powered by a V6 engine, as the third-generation Camry remained in the mid-market but now had grown in proportions to be classified as a mid-size. The Cressida was an upper-level mid-size rear-wheel drive car with a straight-six engine, as the mid-market second-generation Camry was still classified as a compact car in the early 1990s. The Lexus GS, introduced in 1993 – one year after the Cressida's discontinuation – could also be considered a spiritual successor to the Cressida, as a midsize rear-wheel drive Toyota luxury vehicle with a strong kinship to the Toyota Supra and also derived from a shortened version of the Toyota Crown platform.

== Seventh generation (X90; 1992) ==
Seventh generation
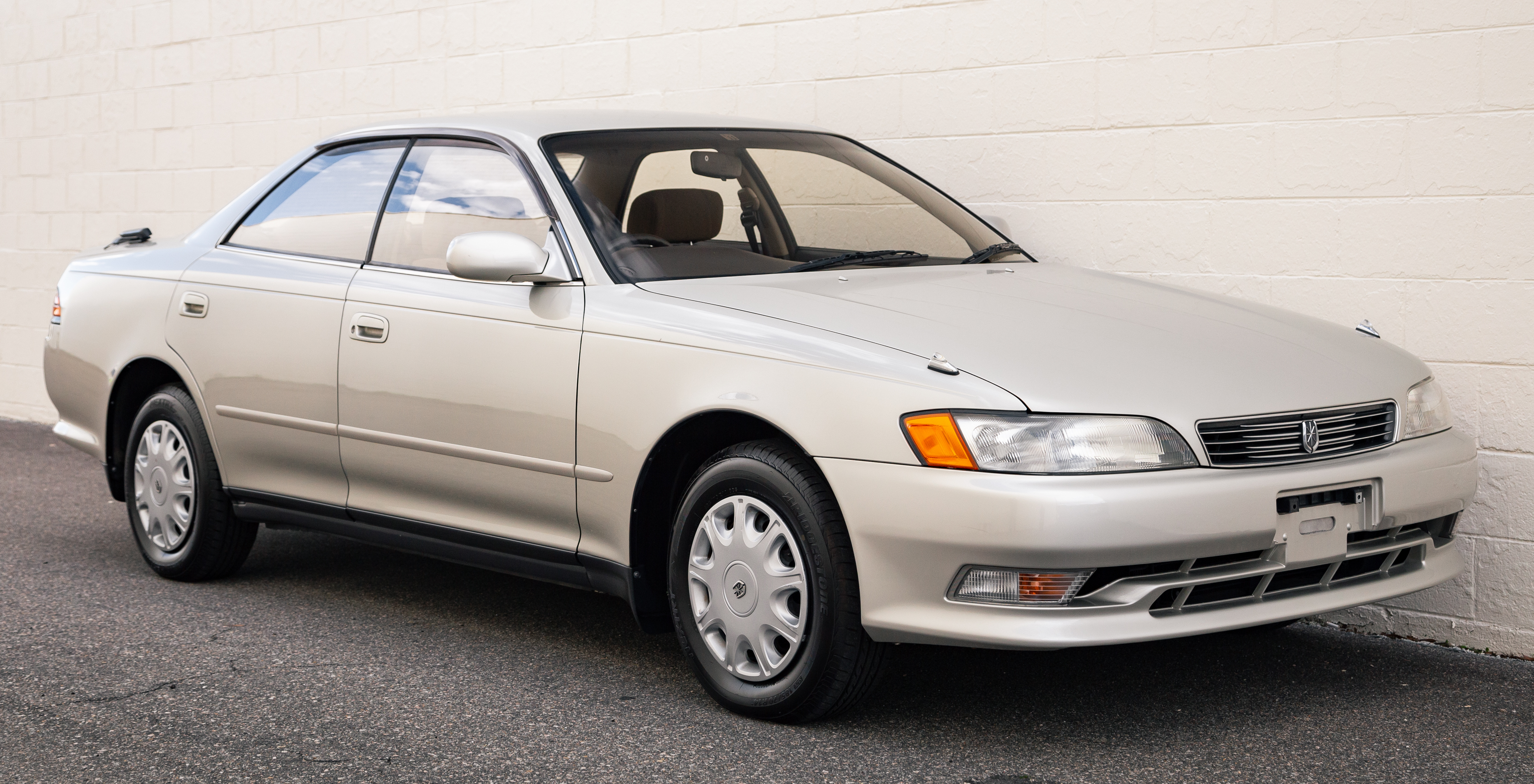
- Toyota Mark II 2.5 Grande (JZX90)

Overview
- Model code: X90
- Production: 1992–1996
- Assembly: Japan: Miyawaka, Fukuoka (Toyota Motor Kyushu)
- Designer: Shiori Watanabe

Body and chassis
- Body style: 4-door pillared hardtop sedan
- Layout: Front engine, rear-wheel drive; Front engine, all-wheel drive (JZX93 only)
- Related: Toyota Cresta (X90); Toyota Chaser (X90)

Powertrain
- Engine: petrol: 1.8 L 4S-FE I4 (SX90); 2.0 L 1G-FE I6 (GX90); 2.5 L 1JZ-GE I6 (JZX90/JZX93); 2.5 L 1JZ-GTE twin-turbo I6 (JZX90); 3.0 L 2JZ-GE I6 (JZX91); diesel: 2.4 L 2L-TE turbo I4 (LX90)

Dimensions
- Wheelbase: 2,730 mm (107.5 in)
- Length: 4,750 mm (187.0 in)
- Width: 1,750 mm (68.9 in)
- Height: 1,390 mm (54.7 in)
- Curb weight: 1,250–1,460 kg (2,756–3,219 lb)

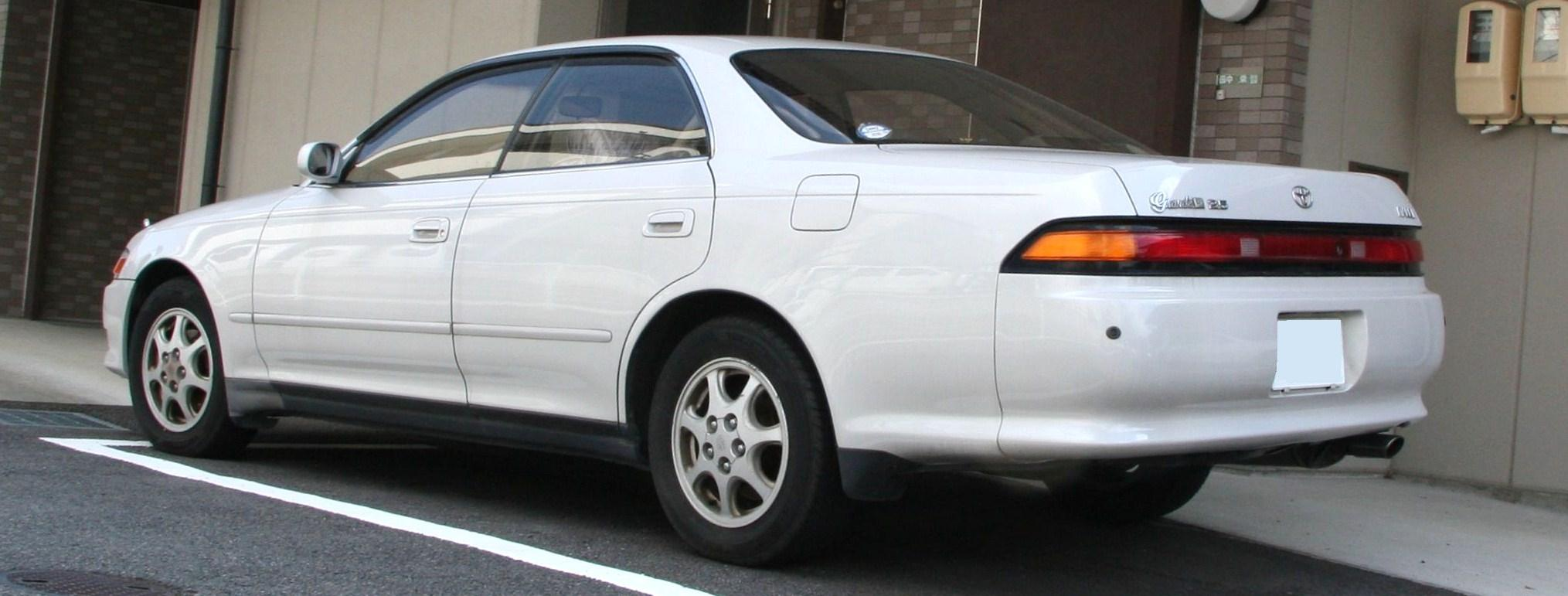
1994 Toyota Mark II 2.5 Grande G (JZX90)

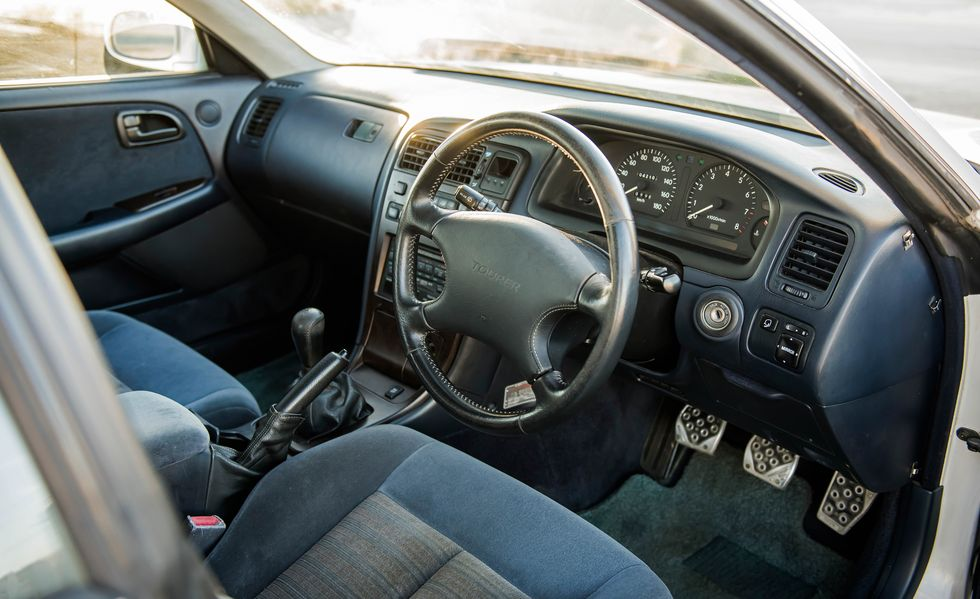
JZX90 Tourer-V Interior shown with factory R154 manual transmission.

A redesigned Mark II was released in October 1992, called the X90-series. It received a new front bumper (including grille), rear bumpers, and tail lights. The JZX90 model, in particular, has gained the nickname "Samurai" partly due to the design of its tail lights, which have a distinctive shape that resembles a samurai sword, known as a katana. This nickname originated and began to spread from the Russian Far East, similar to how other iconic cars have been given formidable nicknames, such as the Nissan GT-R R32 being referred to as "Godzilla". The Mark II had also grown in size, and under Japanese exterior dimension regulations, this series was too wide to be classified as a small-size car, but a normal-size car instead. Buyers who wanted a sedan that remained under the guidelines were now served by the V30-series Camry. Toyota added a new sedan called the Toyota Scepter, with the major difference being a front-wheel-drive powertrain. Styling of this generation showed a corporate similarity to the Toyota Windom, which was exclusive to Toyota Corolla Store locations. The Mark II sedans (and X70 wagons and vans) were planned to sell about 14,000 units per month, while the sister models Cresta and Chaser were expected to have monthly sales of 7,000 and 6,000 units, respectively.

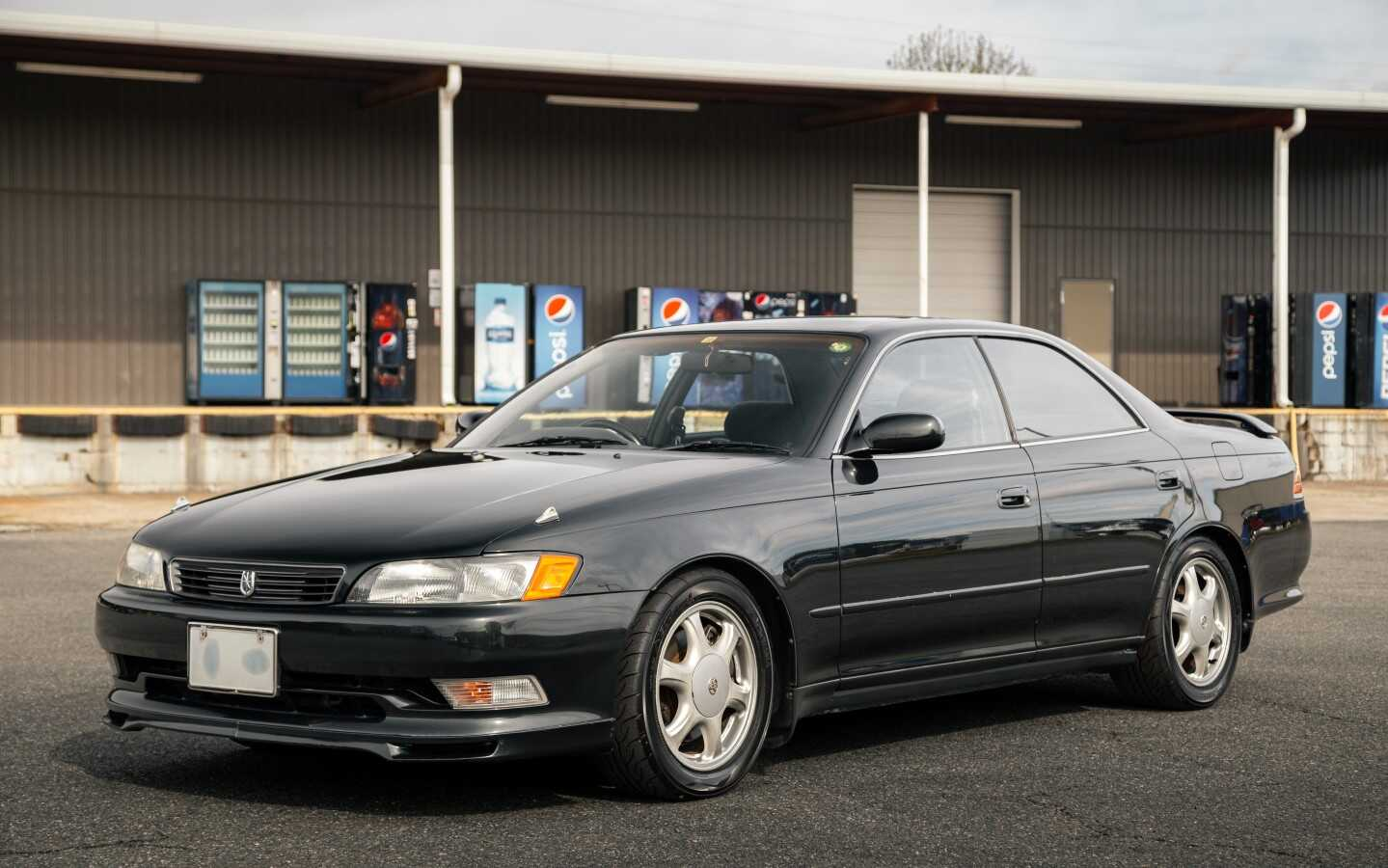
Facelift Toyota Mark II 2.5 Tourer V (JZX90)

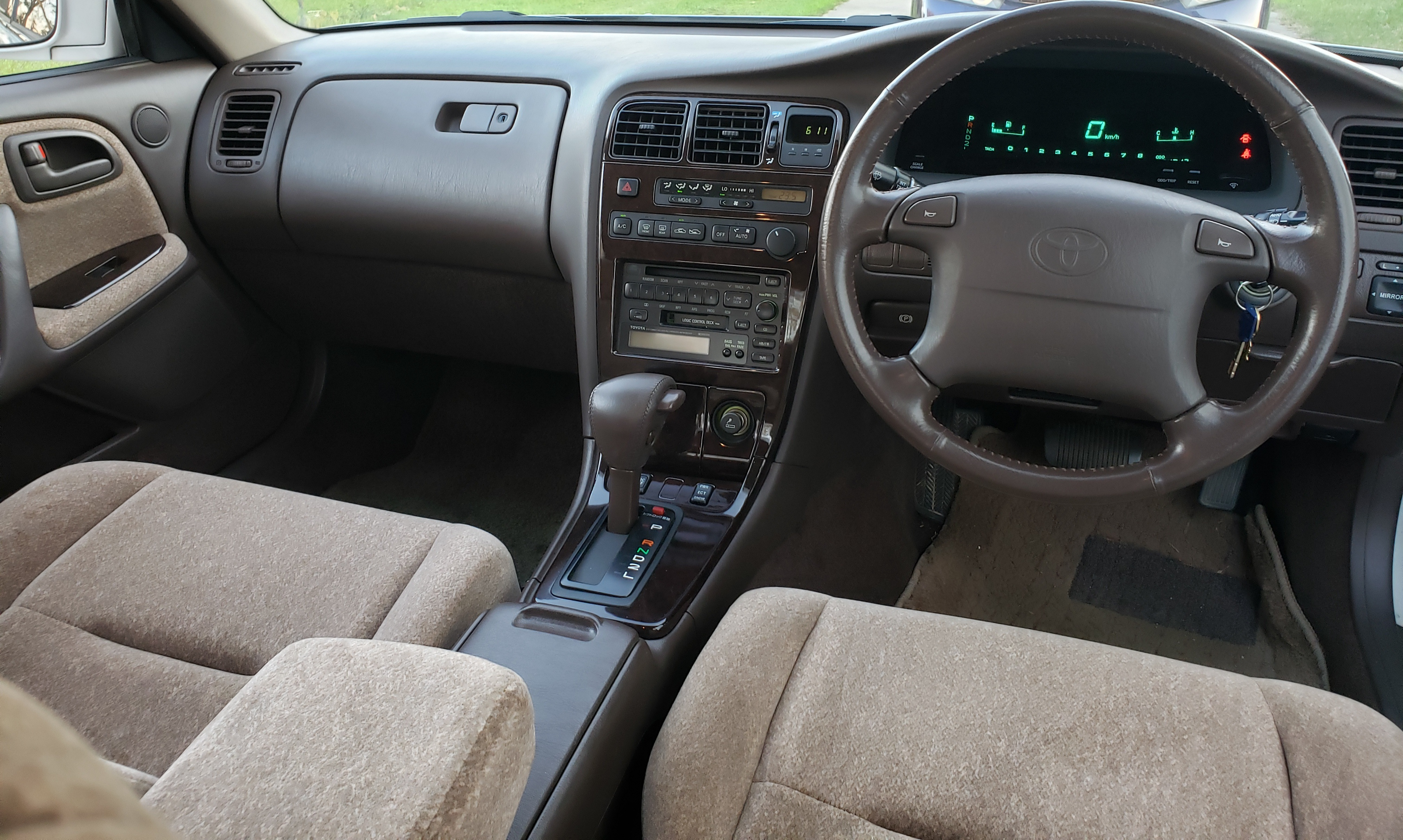
1996 Mark II (X90) Grande G shown with Brown/Tan interior and Digital Instrument Cluster (Specific to Grande G models)

The X90 series was available in six different trim levels. All trims came standard with fully automatic air conditioning and faux wood interior paneling. The base GL was available in either standard or automatic with a choice of a diesel or petrol four-cylinder engine. The slightly more up-market Groire had the same engine and transmission options as the GL with more standard features over its inferior. The diesel engine was now fitted with electronic fuel injection and had lower NO_{x} emissions.

The next four trim levels featured only petrol straight sixes for engines and either rear- or all-wheel drive. The Grande was available with either a 2.0-litre 1G-FE or the 2.5-litre 1JZ-GE and either a four-speed automatic or 5-speed manual for 1G-equipped Mark II Grandes. The Grande was otherwise identical to the Groire in terms of options and equipment. The Grande G was available with either the aforementioned 2.5 L 1JZ-GE or a 3.0 L 2JZ-GE mated to an automatic transmission and came with ABS, Digital Instrument cluster, and traction control standard. Introduced in October 1993, the Grande Four and Grande G Four are equipped with the i-Four Full-time 4WD system. This was only available powered by the 2.5-litre 1JZ-GE engine.

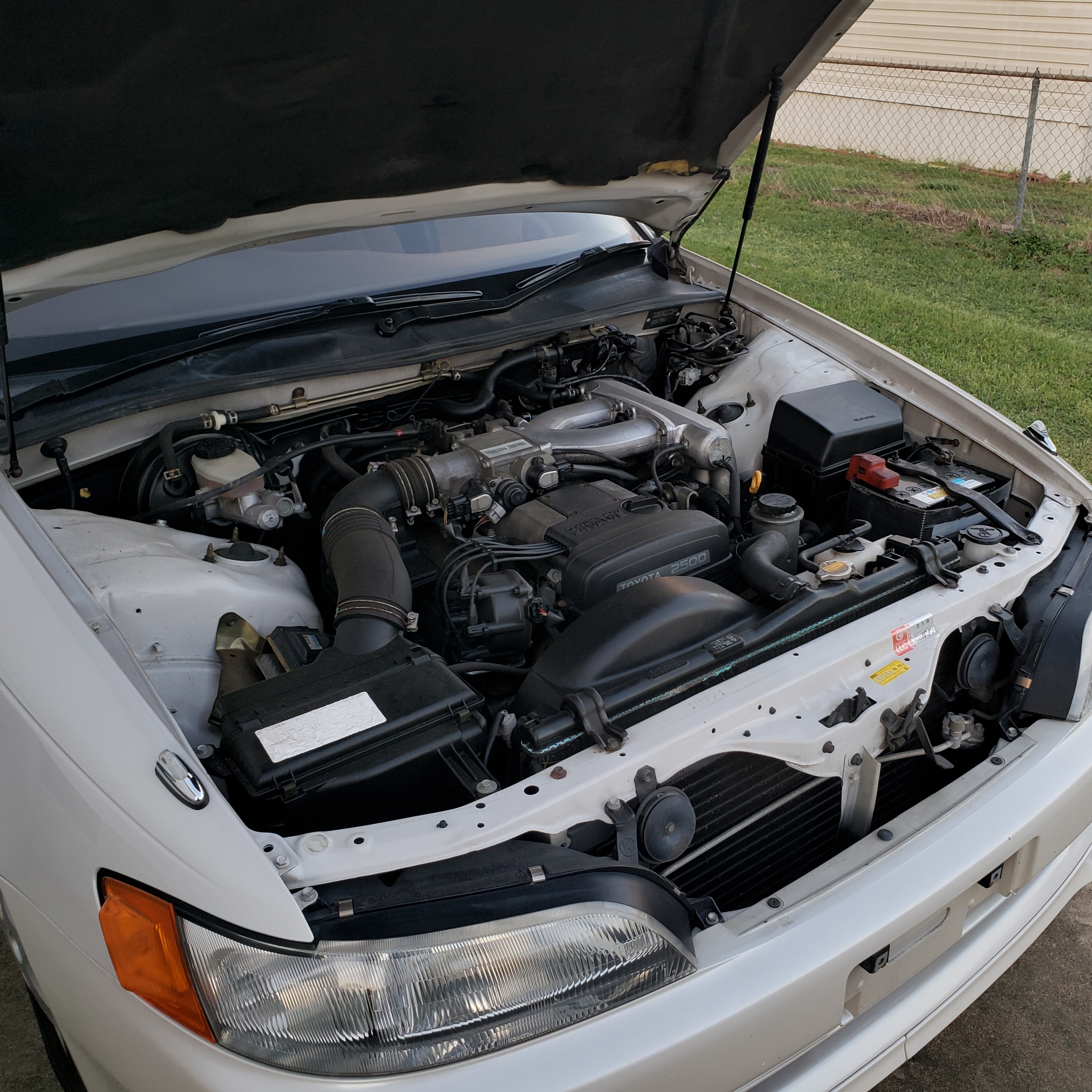
1JZ-GE engine in a 1996 Grande G 2.5

The Tourer S came with a 1JZ-GE engine, 4-speed automatic and several options either standard (such as ABS and control) or not present (a factory limited-slip differential) in either the Grande or Grande G.

Lastly, the Tourer V had a reinforced body, sport suspension, and a twin-turbo 280 hp (209 kW) 2.5-litre 1JZ-GTE inline-six engine. It also came from the factory with, traction control, ABS, an optional Torsen LSD and optional 5-speed manual transmission. The Mark II Tourer V was a popular choice among tuners, enthusiasts, and drifters.

The hardtop approach was used on various segments of core Toyota sedans by offering a more upscale hardtop version. These cars were offered for consumers who wanted the luxurious approach offered by the Toyota Crown hardtop and sedan, as well as the Mark II (four-door hardtop), Cresta (four-door sedan) and Chaser (four-door hardtop and performance enhancements), and the next segment down on the Corona and Carina, called the Toyota Corona EXiV and the Toyota Carina ED, with the Toyota Corolla Ceres and the Toyota Sprinter Marino at the lowest segment, which were all offered at reduced prices and tax liability based on the vehicles size. The various versions were sold at different Toyota dealerships dedicated to particular models.

== Eighth generation (X100; 1996) ==
Eighth generation
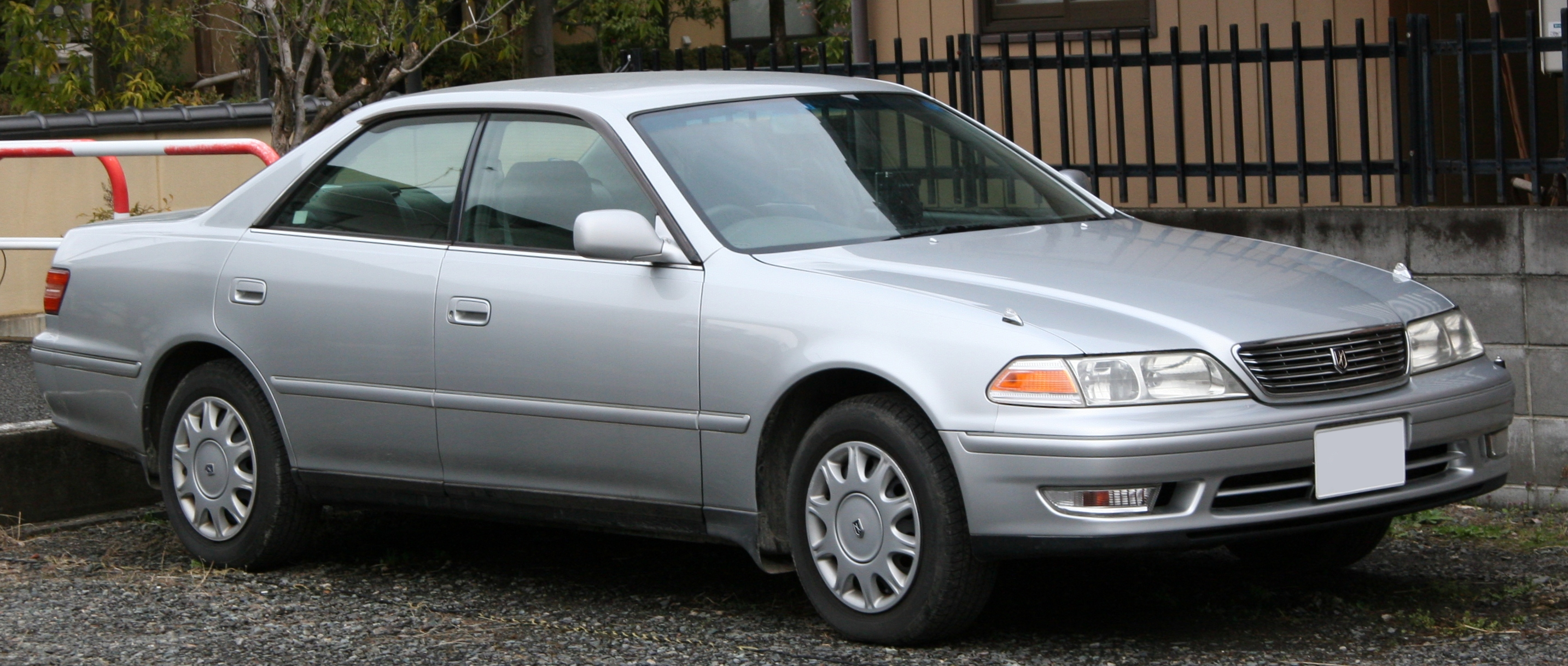
- Pre-facelift Toyota Mark II 2.0 Grande (GX100)

Overview
- Model code: X100
- Production: 1996–2000
- Assembly: Japan: Miyawaka, Fukuoka (Toyota Motor Kyushu)
- Designer: Tetsuo Hattori

Body and chassis
- Body style: 4-door pillared hardtop sedan
- Layout: Front engine, rear-wheel drive; Front engine, all-wheel drive
- Related: Toyota Cresta; Toyota Chaser

Powertrain
- Engine: 2.0 L 1G-FE I6; 2.5 L 1JZ-GE I6; 2.5 L 1JZ-GTE turbocharged I6; 3.0 L 2JZ-GE I6; diesel: 2.4 L 2L-TE turbodiesel I4

Dimensions
- Wheelbase: 2,730 mm (107.5 in)
- Length: 4,760 mm (187.4 in)
- Width: 1,755 mm (69.1 in)
- Height: 1,400 mm (55.1 in)
- Curb weight: 1,390–1,450 kg (3,064–3,197 lb)

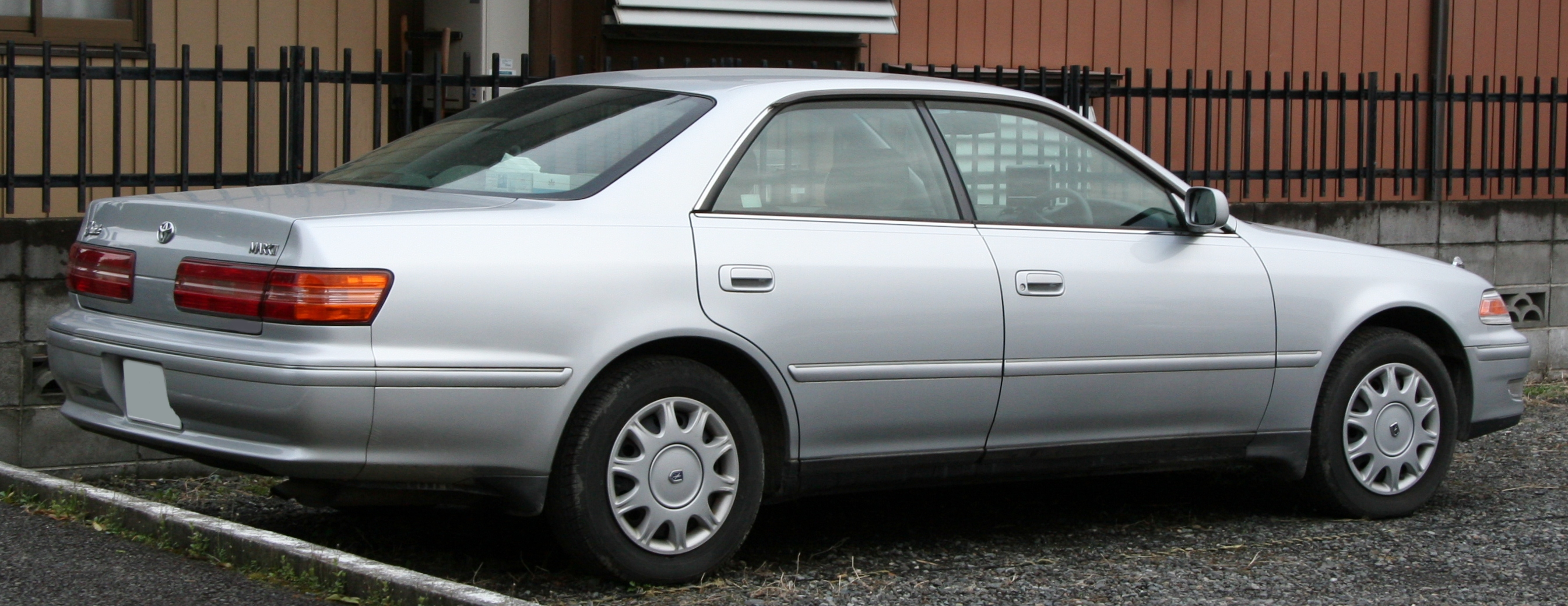
Pre-facelift Toyota Mark II 2.0 Grande (GX100)

Like its predecessor, the X100-series Toyota Mark II was available in multiple trim levels. New for this generation run was the Toyota's new VVTi system on its engines. Also new was the standardization of ABS and a new electronic traction control system. The Groire trim level was also dropped for this production run, and was named for a village in the Centre-Val de Loire of France.

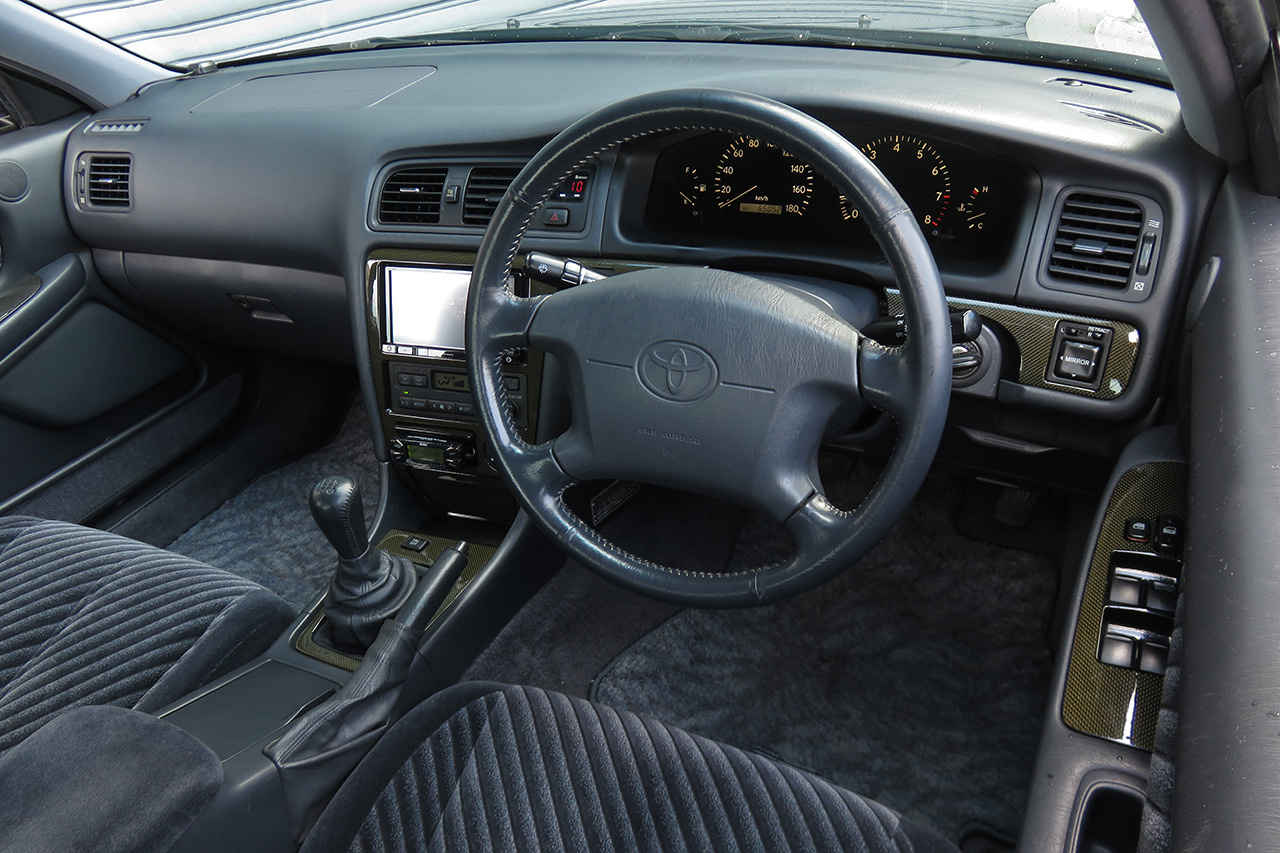
S1 Pre-facelift JZX100 Tourer-V interior shown with the factory R154 manual transmission and carbon fiber interior accents.

The base GL came with only the 2.4-litre 2L-TE turbo-diesel straight-four mated to a four-speed automatic. It came with basic features like power windows and door locks and automatic air-conditioning, but sportier options were only available on higher-level trims. However, traction control and ABS were available as options.

The Grande trim levels had a plethora of options and features available not limited to but including tilt-steering, standard ABS, traction control and AWD. The base Grande was powered by either the 2.0-litre 1G-FE inline-six mated to a 5-speed manual transmission or 4-speed automatic, the 2.4-litre 2L-TE mated to a four-speed automatic from the GL or the 2.5-litre 1JZ-GE, turning a four-speed automatic as well. New for 1996 was the Grande Four: a four-wheel-drive variant of the Grande, it was powered by the 1JZ-GE and mated to a 4-speed automatic transmission sending power to the All-Trac drivetrain through a centre differential. The Grande G versions were available with a digital instrument cluster and either a 1JZ- or 2JZ-GE with a 4-speed automatic. The "G package" included leather anointments for the steering wheel and seats as well as power front seats. A Grande G Four was also offered with the 1JZ engine, 4-speed auto transmission and all-wheel drive.

The Tourer trim level carried on from the X90 series in both Tourer S and Tourer V. The Tourer S was powered by a naturally aspirated 1JZ-GE and mated to a 4-speed automatic. The Tourer V received some noticeable tweaks from its X90 series counterpart: along with the implementation of ETCS and VVTi, the engine now received forced induction through one large turbocharger as opposed to two smaller ones in a parallel configuration. According to Toyota, this smoothed out the torque curve allowing the engine to deliver more torque at a lower RPM and with VVTi, improved the car's fuel economy.

The Facelift model was unveiled in August 1998. It was featured a redesigned the radiator grille and rear taillights. The 1G-FE engine fitted to the Grande was upgraded with VVT-i. In April 1999 a new variant was added called the Grande Regalia. The Grande Regalia is a luxury version of the Grande trim..

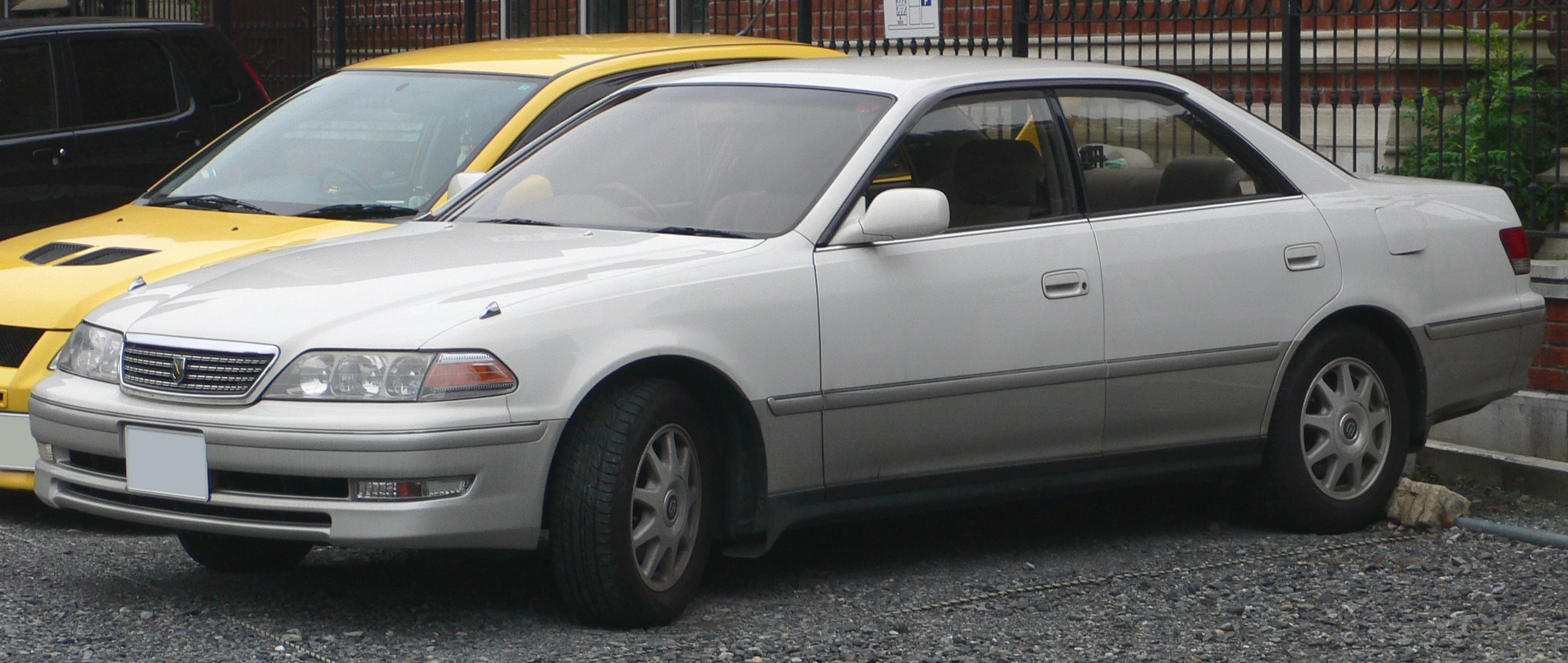
Facelift model Toyota Mark II 2.5 Grande (JZX100)

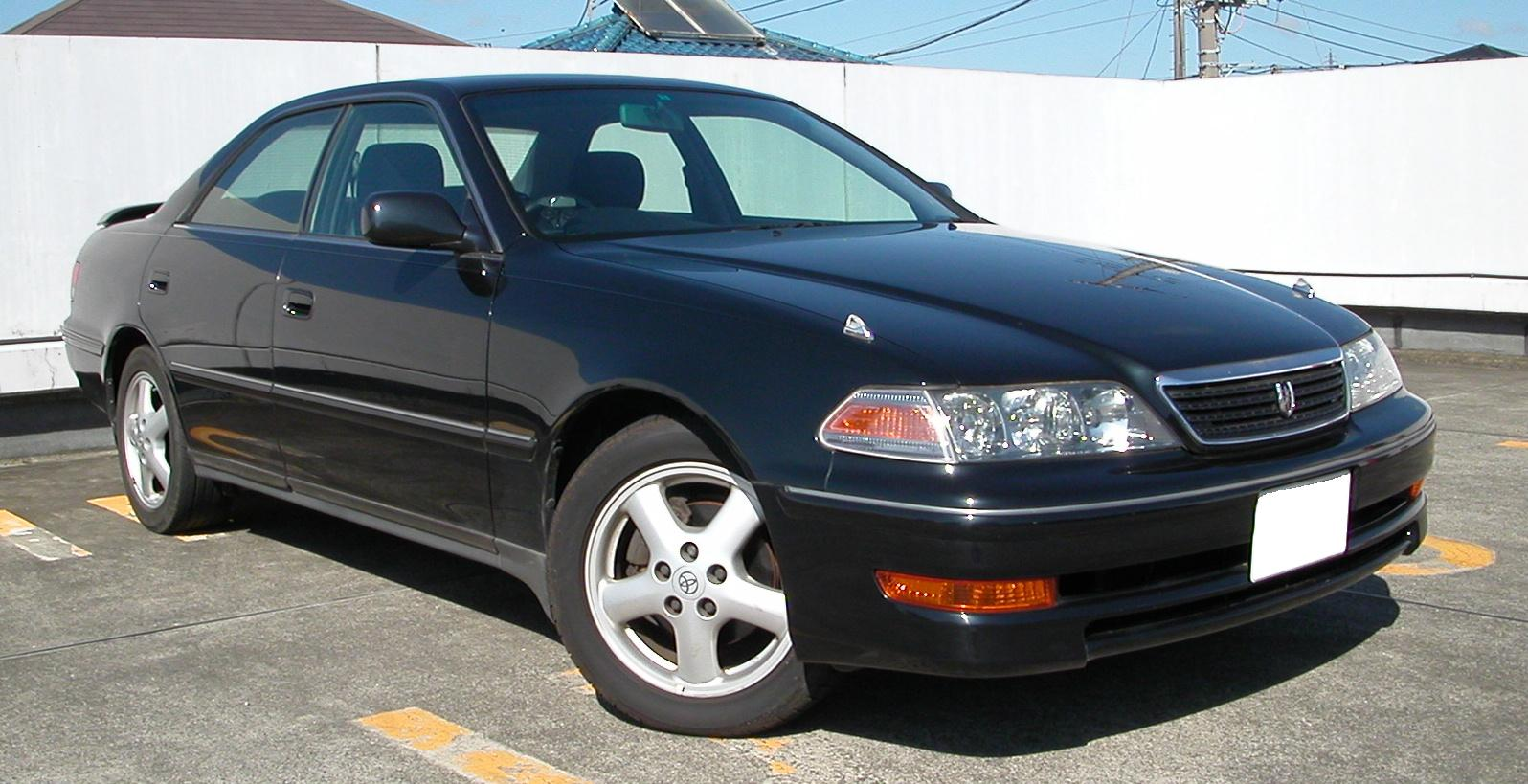
Facelift model Toyota Mark II 2.5 Tourer V (JZX100)

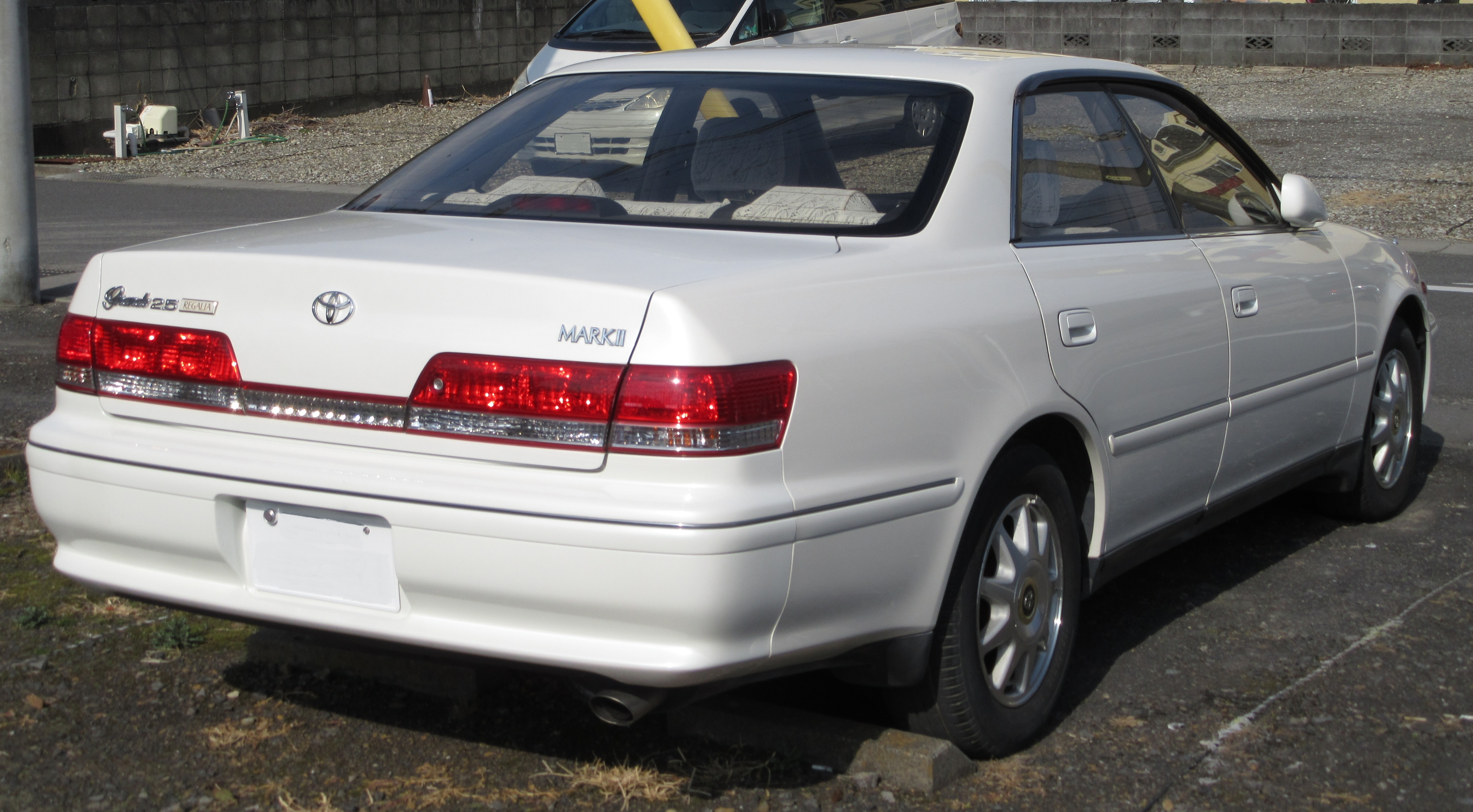
Facelift model Toyota Mark II 2.5 Grande Regalia (JZX100)

=== Mark II Qualis (XV20; 1997) ===
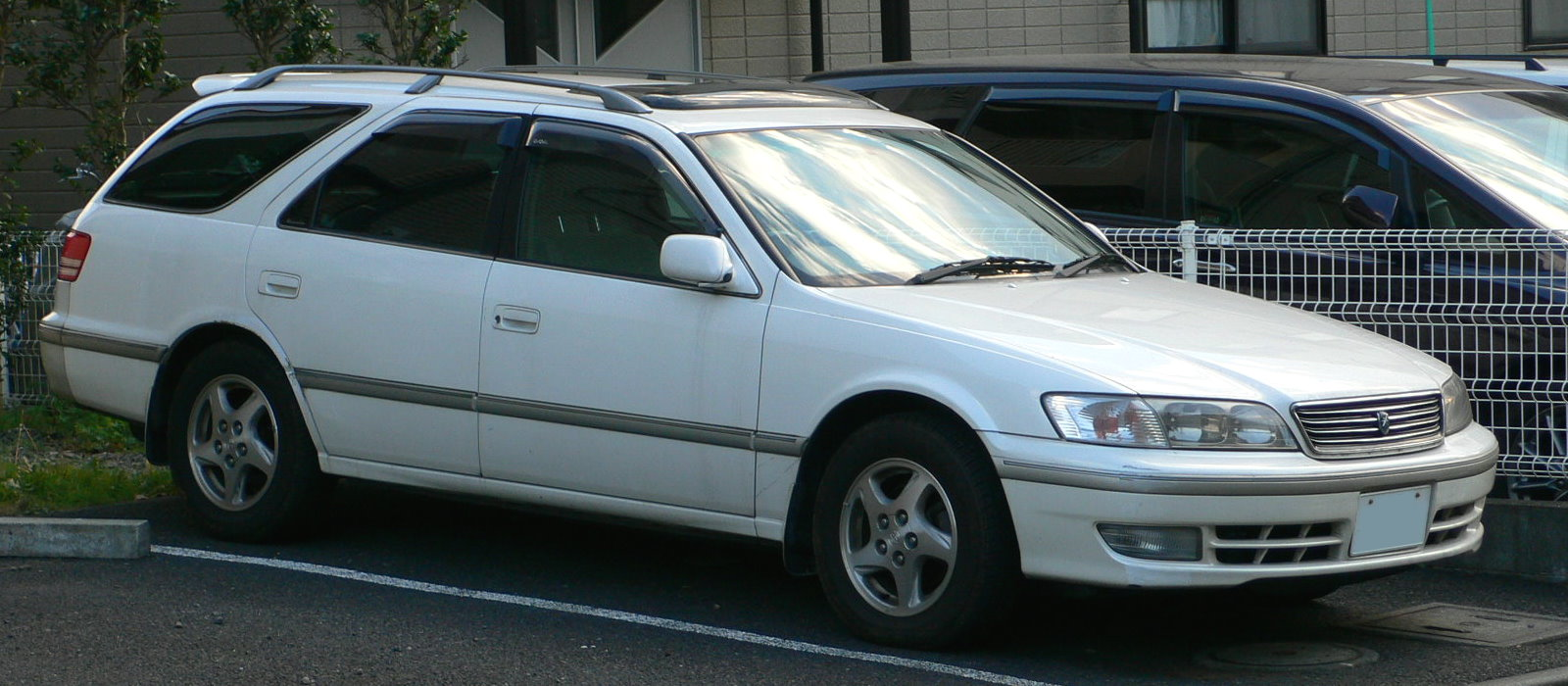
1997 Mark II Qualis (based on the Camry wagon)

To continue to offer Mark II customers the option of purchasing a station wagon at Toyopet Store locations, Toyota introduced the Toyota Mark II Qualis which was nearly identical to the Camry-based station wagon called the Camry Gracia. The Gracia was exclusive to Toyota Corolla Store locations next to the Camry.

== Ninth generation (X110; 2000) ==
Ninth generation
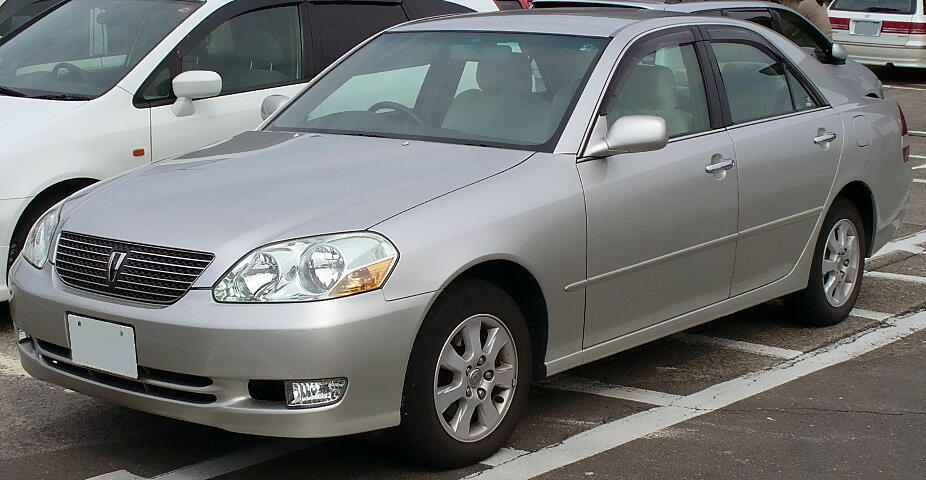
- 2000 Toyota Mark II (Japan)

Overview
- Manufacturer: Kanto Auto Works
- Model code: X110
- Production: October 2000 – October 2004 (sedan); January 2002 – June 2007 (wagon)
- Assembly: Japan: Kanegasaki, Iwate (Kanto Auto Works)

Body and chassis
- Body style: 4-door sedan
- Layout: Front engine, rear-wheel drive; Front engine, all-wheel drive
- Related: Toyota Mark II Blit; Toyota Verossa; Lexus IS; Toyota Brevis; Toyota Progrès; Toyota Origin

Powertrain
- Engine: 2.0 L 1G-FE petrol I6; 2.5 L 1JZ-GE petrol I6; 2.5 L 1JZ-FSE direct inject petrol I6; 2.5 L 1JZ-GTE turbocharged petrol I6

Dimensions
- Wheelbase: 2,780 mm (109.4 in)
- Length: 4,735 mm (186.4 in) (sedan)
- Width: 1,760 mm (69.3 in) (sedan)
- Height: 1,460 mm (57.5 in) (sedan)
- Curb weight: 1,390–1,530 kg (3,064–3,373 lb) (sedan)

This last generation of Mark II hosted several new technologies for Toyota. The new 2.5 L with the designation of 1JZ-FSE is the first application of Direct Injection for mass production on a Toyota passenger vehicle. This version of the JZ series engine features a redesigned head to optimize fuel economy and performance. Along with the 1JZ-FSE, the 1G-FE, 1JZ-GE and 1JZ-GTE are available and all with VVT-i technology. This generation of Mark II also host a new feature call Navi AI-shift, which uses GPS signals and shifts the automatic transmission into the appropriate gear.

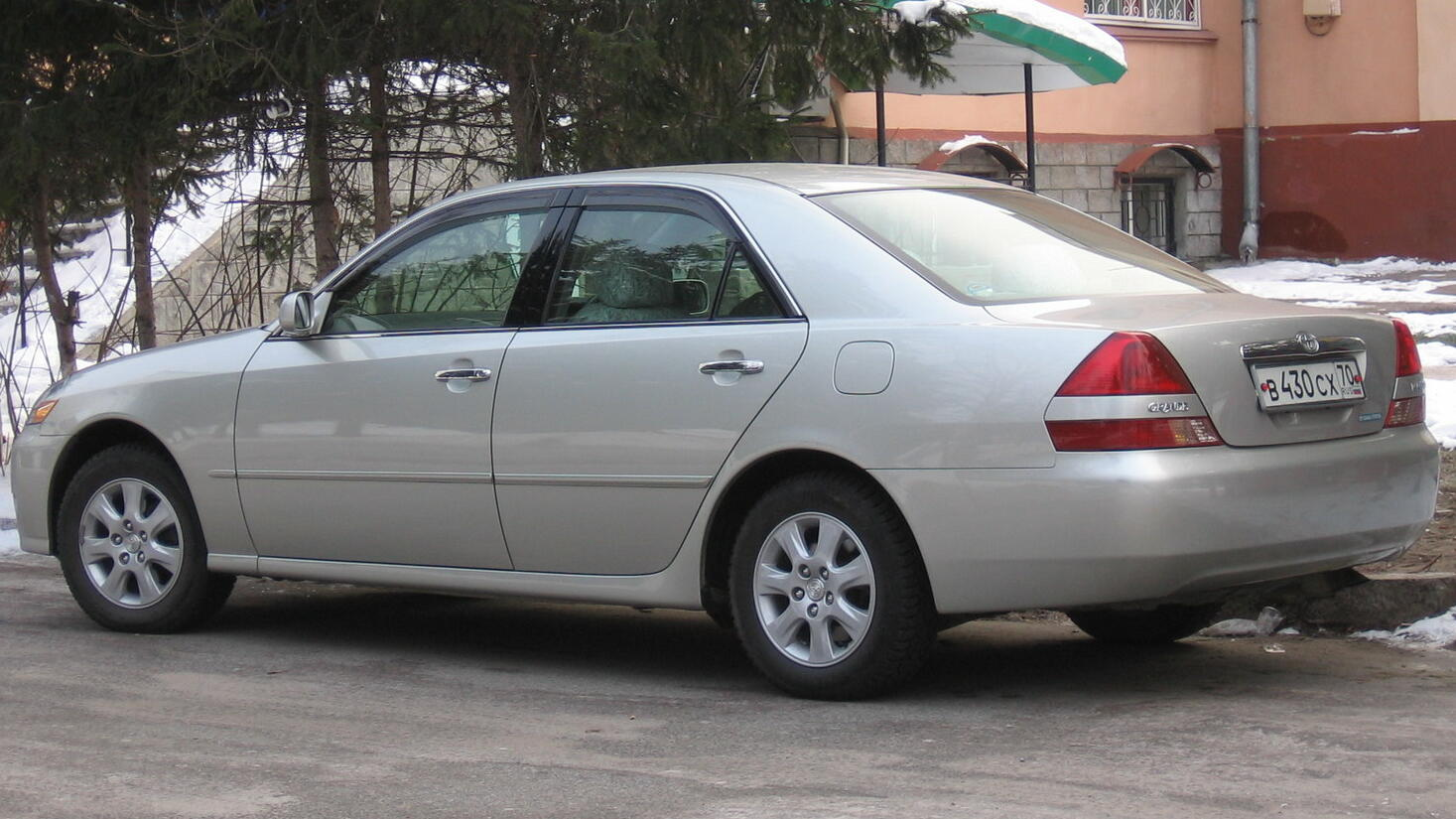
2000–2002 Toyota Mark II (X110)

The X110 series discontinued the hardtop version in favor of the conventional sedan.

During this time, Toyota has discontinued the Chaser and Cresta nameplate and created the Verossa. Toyota has also eliminated the Tourer S and Tourer V and instead called their sportier version 2.5 Grande iR-S and 2.5 Grande iR-V, respectively. iR meaning Intelligent Rapidly. Other models include the 2.0 Grande, 2.5 Grande, 2.5 Grande G, 2.5 Grande G-tb. The 2.5 Grande G Four, 2.0 Grande Four, and the 2.0 Grande Four "S package" all came equipped with All-Trac AWD.

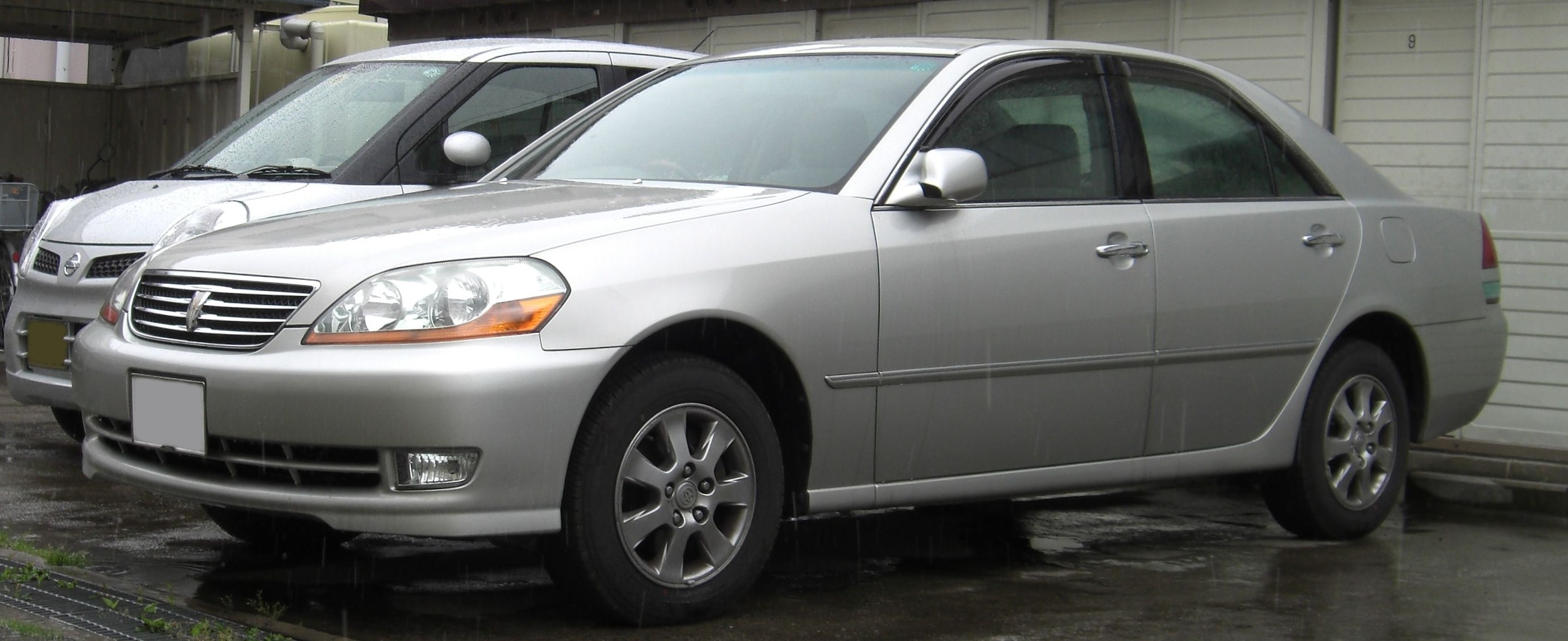
Facelift

Minor changes were made in October 2002. New headlight, grille and a redesigned bumper freshen up the front end while a new taillight design and new chrome trim for the boot handle finish up the rear end. The introduction of the 2.0 L iR grade was added alongside the iR-S and iR-V. The iR-V was the only model to feature a hand brake (instead of a floor mounted E-brake) and was the only model to include an optional R154 5 speed manual transmission. The G-tb model was discontinued in favor for the 2.0 L iR model. Another model introduced by Toyota for the Mark II is their special edition, Regalia, which marks the 35th Anniversary of the Mark II nameplate.

In January 2001, a separate optional package called Fortuna, which was created by Modellista. This package came with a aero front bumper, a new grille, 5-spoke 18-inch alloy wheels and a sport suspension that lowered the ride height.

=== Mark II Blit (X110; 2002) ===
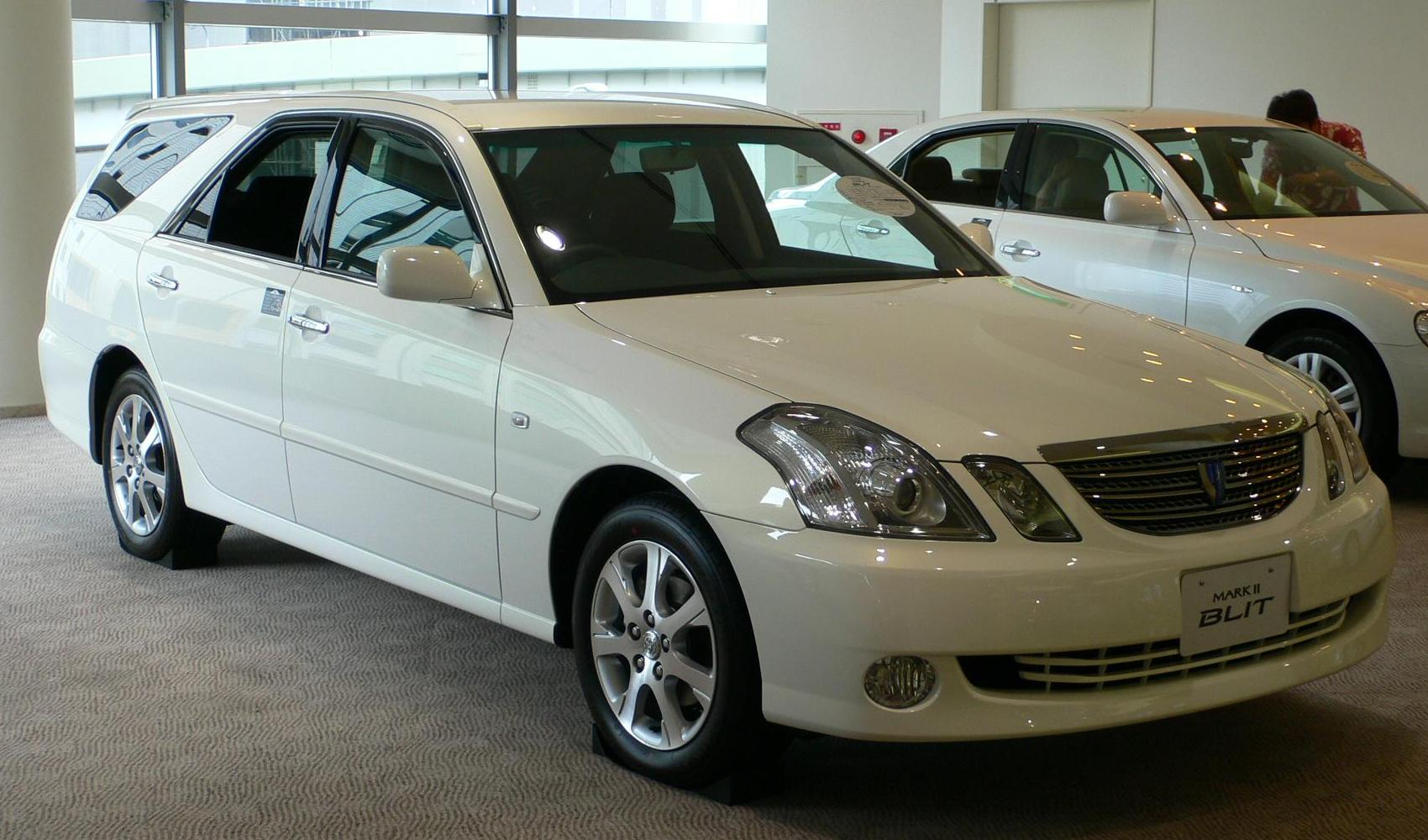
2006 Toyota Mark II Blit

The Mark II Blit is the wagon version of the X110 Mark II. It was introduced in January 2002 as a replacement for the Toyota Mark II Qualis. The Blit was a return to the Mark II platform with rear-wheel drive and optional AWD, and not a wagon version of the front wheel drive Camry. The Blit used straight-six engines with an optional turbo that was discontinued in May 2006. The engines used were the same as the sedan model.

The Mark II Blit was exclusive to Toyota Japanese dealership Toyopet Store (except in Tokyo and Osaka, where Toyota and Osaka Toyota dealers also carried the Blit).

== Sales ==
| Calendar year | US sales |
|---|---|
| 1977 | 2,526 |
| 1978 | 12,484 |
| 1979 | 11,910 |
| 1980 | 11,627 |
| 1981 | 29,583 |
| 1982 | 37,448 |
| 1983 | 39,755 |
| 1984 | 34,456 |
| 1985 | 45,286 |
| 1986 | 42,180 |
| 1987 | 21,968 |
| 1988 | 14,035 |
| 1989 | 23,785 |
| 1990 | 12,710 |
| 1991 | 9,415 |
| 1992 | 3,528 |
| 1993 | 322 |
| 1994 | 5 |
| 1995 | 10 |
| Total | 353,033 |

== See also ==
- List of Toyota vehicles
