= 4M =

4M or 4-M may refer to:

- 4m, or 4 metres
- 4-meter band in amateur radio
- 4M, a model of Toyota M engine
- 4M, a model of Mitsubishi 4M4 engine
- 4M, a model of HP LaserJet 4
- DC-4M, a designation of Canadair North Star
- A-4M, a model of Douglas A-4 Skyhawk
- Fokker DH-4M, see Airco DH.4
- VF-4M, see VMA-211
- VB-4M, see VMFA-232
- PB-4M, see Osa (handgun)
- Sun-4m, a model of Sun-4 workstation
- Mayall 4m telescope, see Nicholas U. Mayall Telescope
- Meade 4M Community, an astronomy awareness community sponsored by Meade Instruments
- LATAM Argentina, a defunct airline based in Buenos Aires, Argentina
- J-4M, see Barnett J4B
- 4M of manufacture industries are Man, Money, Material and Machine. Also see resource management and Ishikawa diagram.
- 4M Software applications for Engineers, see IDEA Architectural and FINE MEP
- 4M, Manfred Memorial Moon Mission, first commercial Moon mission
- 4M, the production code for the 1976 Doctor Who serial The Masque of Mandragora

== See also ==
- M4 (disambiguation)
