= 1004 (disambiguation) =

AD 1004 was a leap year starting on Saturday of the Julian calendar.

1004 may also refer to:

- 1004 (number)
- 1004 BC, a year Before the Common Era

== Places ==
- 1004 Belopolskya, an asteroid in the asteroid belt, the 1004th asteroid registered
- Route 1004; see List of highways numbered 1004
- 1004 Estate, Victoria Island, Lagos, Nigeria

== Vehicles ==
- Glas 1004, a German automobile
- German submarine U-1004, a Type VIIC/41 German WWII U-boat
- USS Qui Vive (SP-1004), a WWI U.S. Navy patrol boat

== Other uses ==
- United Nations Security Council Resolution 1004 (1995) concerning Srebrenica during the Yugoslavian wars of dissolution
- UNIVAC 1004, a digital computer
- ISO 1004, a standard for magnetic ink

== See also ==
- MIV (disambiguation)
- 104 (disambiguation)
