= MI-5 =

MI-5 may refer to:

- MI5, the domestic security service of the United Kingdom
- MI-5, a television series broadcast in some countries under this name rather than its original title Spooks
  - MI-5, a 2015 British film based on the series, released as Spooks: The Greater Good in some countries
- Michigan's 5th congressional district
- M-5 (Michigan highway), in the U.S. state of Michigan
- Mission: Impossible – Rogue Nation, a 2015 action film known in shorthand as M:I-5 starring Tom Cruise
- CKMI-DT, a television station known as "MI 5" when it was based in Quebec City
- Tales of Monkey Island (also known as Monkey Island 5), videogame

== See also ==
- Mil V-5, a helicopter project that never reached production
- MIV (disambiguation)
