= Toyota 2000GT =

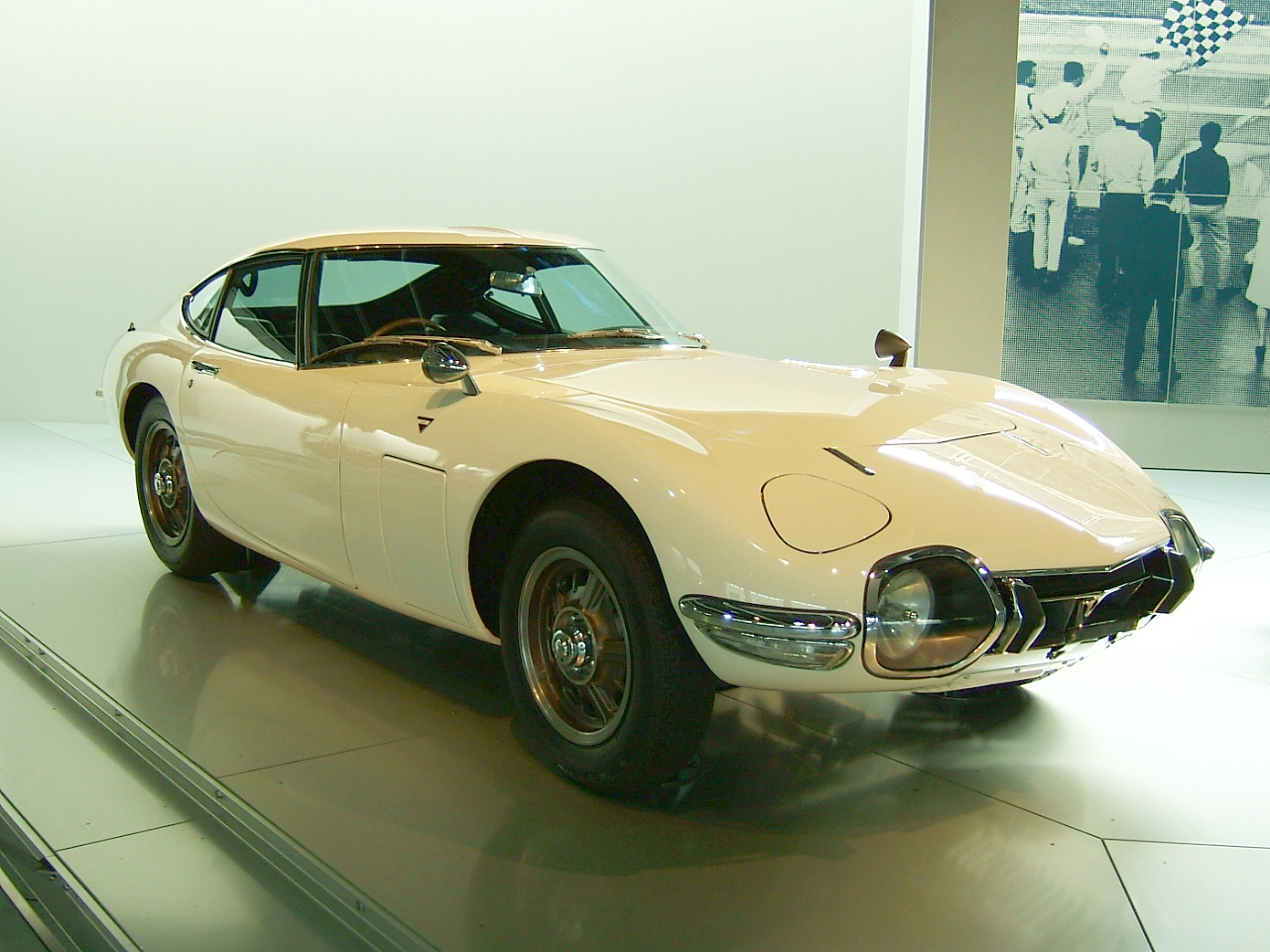
- 1967–1969 Toyota 2000GT

Overview
- Manufacturer: Toyota Motor Corporation and Yamaha Motor Corporation (joint project)
- Model code: F10
- Production: 1967–1970 (351 produced)
- Assembly: Japan: Iwata, Shizuoka (Yamaha Motors)
- Designer: Jiro Kono (Shusa, product manager); Satoru Nozaki (industrial designer)

Body and chassis
- Class: Sports car/grand tourer
- Body style: 2-door fastback coupé; 2-door roadster (movie car only)
- Layout: Front mid-engine, rear-wheel-drive

Powertrain
- Engine: Gasoline: 2.0 L 3M DOHC I6 (MF10); 2.3 L 2M-B SOHC I6 (MF12)
- Power output: 150 PS (148 hp; 110 kW) (3M); 140 PS (138 hp; 103 kW) (2M-B)
- Transmission: 5-speed manual; 3-speed automatic

Dimensions
- Wheelbase: 2,330 mm (91.7 in)
- Length: 4,175 mm (164.4 in)
- Width: 1,600 mm (63.0 in)
- Height: 1,104 mm (43.5 in) (roadster); 1,160 mm (45.7 in); 1,170 mm (46.1 in) (1969–1970)
- Curb weight: 1,120 kg (2,469 lb)

The Toyota 2000GT is a limited-production front mid-engine, rear-wheel-drive, two-door, two-seat sports car/grand tourer designed by Toyota in collaboration with Yamaha. First displayed to the public at the Tokyo Motor Show in 1965, the 2000GT was manufactured under contract by Yamaha between 1967 and 1970. A halo car for the automaker, in Japan it was exclusive to Toyota's Japanese retail sales channel called Toyota Store.

The 2000GT revolutionized the automotive world's view of Japan, then viewed as a producer of imitative and stodgily practical vehicles. As a sleek, high-performance fastback coupé, it demonstrated its auto makers could produce a sports car to rival the better marques of Europe. Reviewing a pre-production 2000GT in 1967, Road & Track magazine summed up the car as "one of the most exciting and enjoyable cars we've driven", and compared it favorably to the Porsche 911. Today, the 2000GT is seen as the first seriously collectible Japanese car and by some as its first supercar, while others claim the later Honda NSX holds that title. Examples of the 2000GT have sold at auction for as much as US$1,200,000 in 2013.

== Background ==
Automobile ownership in Japan during the late 1950s and early 1960s began to pick up, and Toyota noticed that most international manufacturers had a top level sports car or grand touring coupe, that would draw customers into showrooms and dealerships and drive sales of other more affordable models. Ford had recently introduced the Thunderbird, Chrysler had the C-300 while GM's Chevrolet Division had the Corvette. In Europe, Mercedes-Benz had the 300SL, BMW briefly offered the 507, Porsche had the 356, Jaguar had the E-Type, Aston Martin had the DB4, Ferrari had the 250 GT Coupé, and Maserati had the 3500 GT. In Japan, Nissan offered the Datsun Sports, while Honda introduced the S500 and Prince offered the Skyline Sport Coupé. Toyota had already began production of the Sports 800, but the engine was far too small to be considered a world class sports car, and decided they needed to offer a proper 6-cylinder coupe.

Most of the 2000GT's design was done by Yamaha Motor Corporation, who also contributed contract assistance for other Japanese manufacturers, including Nissan. In 1959, Yamaha established the Technical Research Institute to develop their own sports car, and had built the YX30 sports car with a 4-cylinder engine displacing 1600cc, having drawn inspiration from the British MGA B-Series 1600 DOHC engine. Due to various problems, Yamaha senior management decided to close the research facility in 1962, but enthusiasm of developing a sports car led to them partnering with an established auto manufacturer. A prototype called the "A550X" was built, but Nissan cancelled the project and introduced the slow selling Nissan Silvia coupe in 1965. Yamaha then proposed the design to Toyota, for whom they also did contract work, then perceived as the most conservative of the Japanese car manufacturers. Wishing to improve their image, Toyota accepted the proposal, but employed a design from their own designer Satoru Nozaki.

== Styling ==
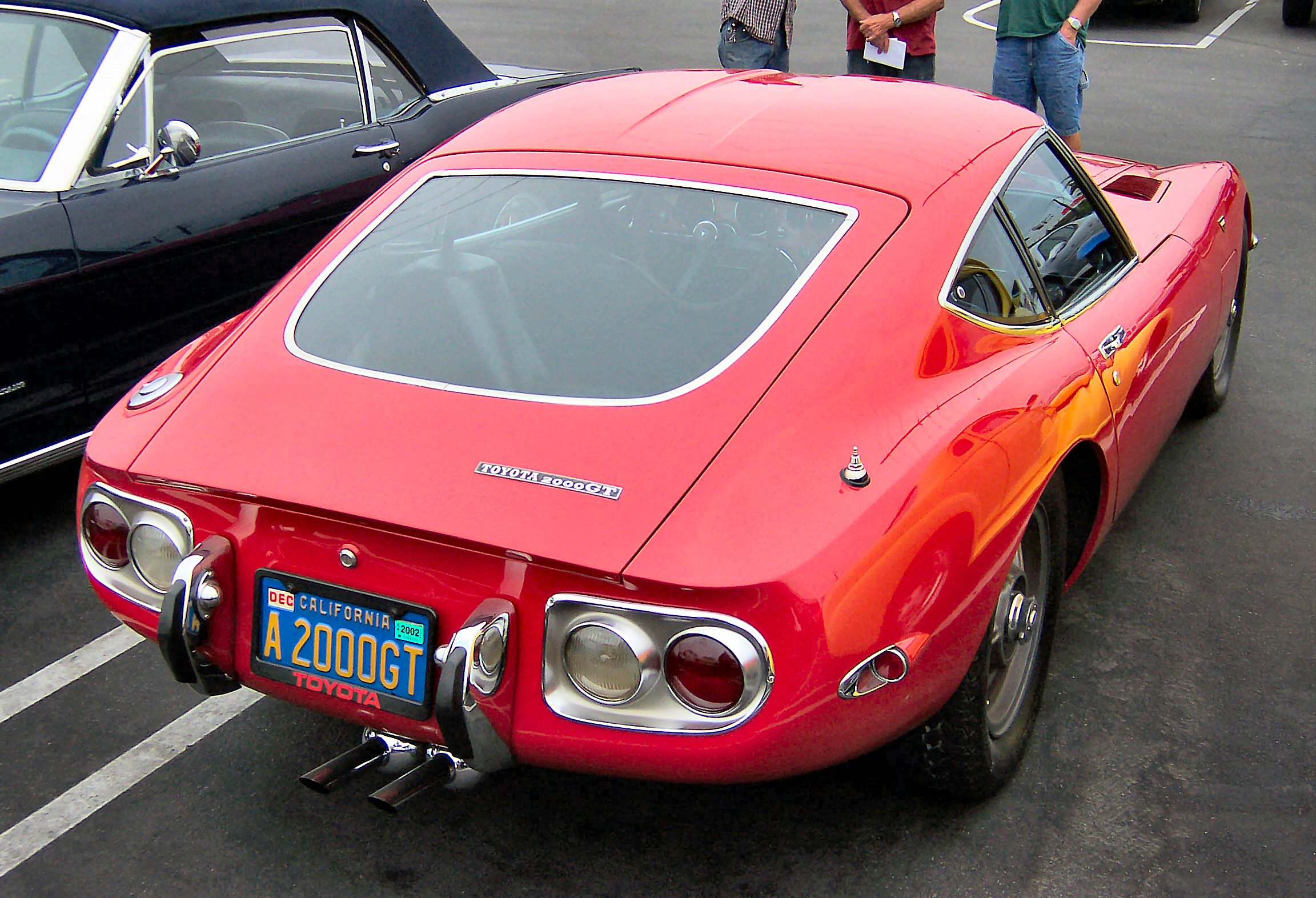
Toyota 2000GT from rear

The 2000GT incorporated many classic 1960s Gran Turismo design elements. Nozaki's styling was inspired by the E-type Jaguar. Its smoothly flowing bodywork featured pop-up headlights above large plexiglass covered driving lamps flanking the grille similar to those on the Toyota Sports 800. Bumpers were minimal, and the car was extremely low, just 116 cm (45.7 in) to the highest point of the roof. Despite a custom open-top version built for the James Bond film You Only Live Twice, a factory-produced convertible was never offered.

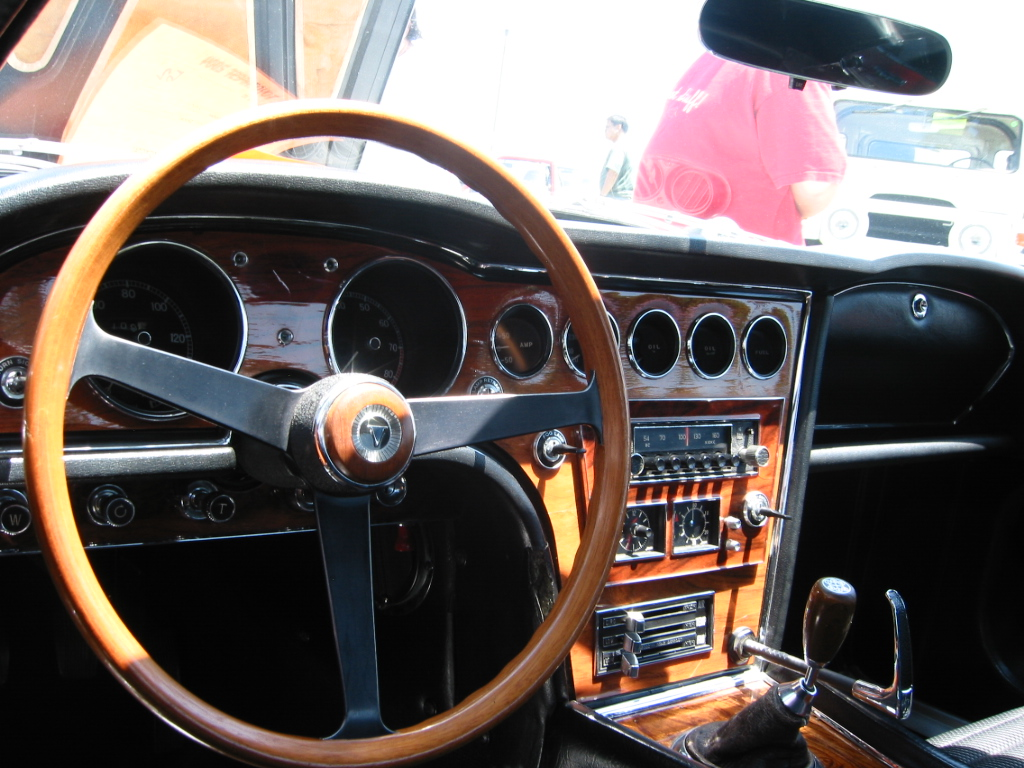
Toyota 2000GT dashboard

The interior offered comfortable, if cramped, accommodation and luxury touches such as a walnut or rosewood veneer dashboard inlays provided by Yamaha's musical instrument woodworking facilities, and an auto-signal seeking radio tuner. Road & Track was impressed, considering the interior suited to a "luxurious GT" and calling the 2000GT an impressive car "in which to sit or ride - or simply admire." An electric clock and a stopwatch were installed in the dashboard below the radio and above the climate controls.

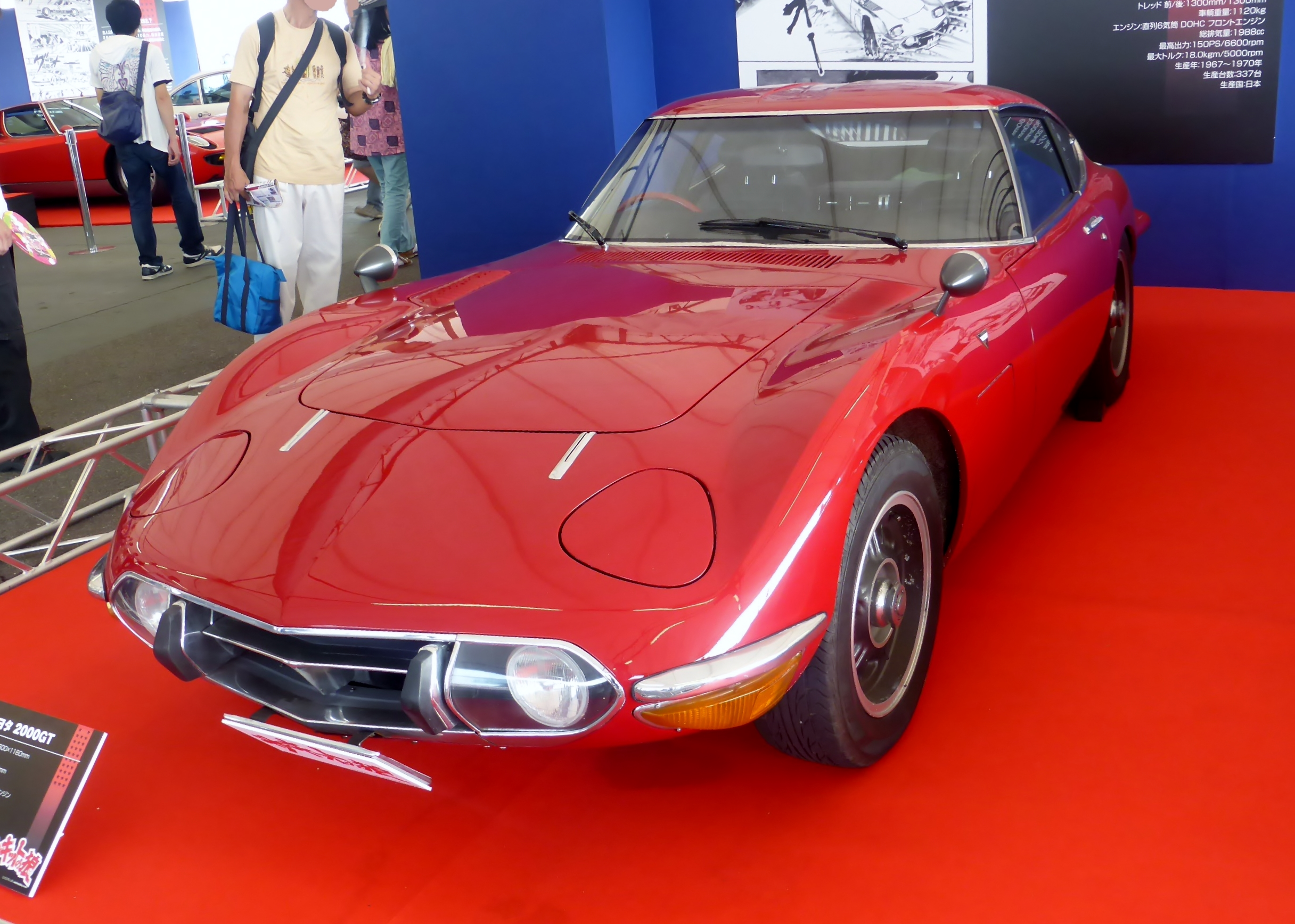
Toyota 2000GT facelift

In August 1969, the front was modified slightly, making the driving lamps smaller and changing the shape of the turn signals. The rear turn signals were enlarged at the same time, and some alterations were made to modernise the interior. The last few vehicles were fitted with air conditioning and had automatic transmission as an option. These cars had an additional scoop fitted underneath the grille to supply air to the air conditioning unit.

== Drivetrain ==
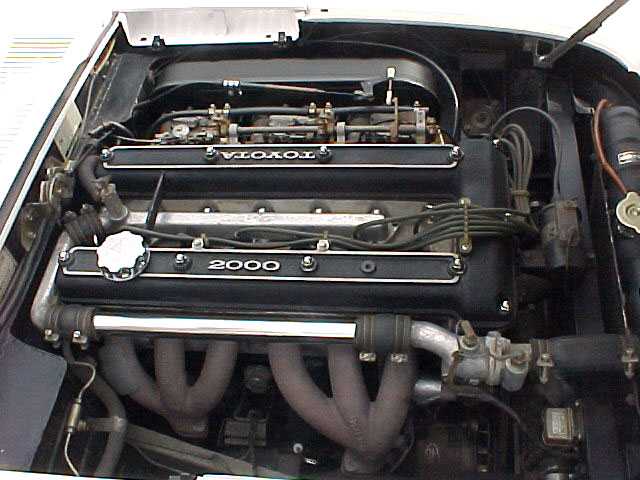
The 3M DOHC 2.0 liter inline six was the 2000GT's main engine

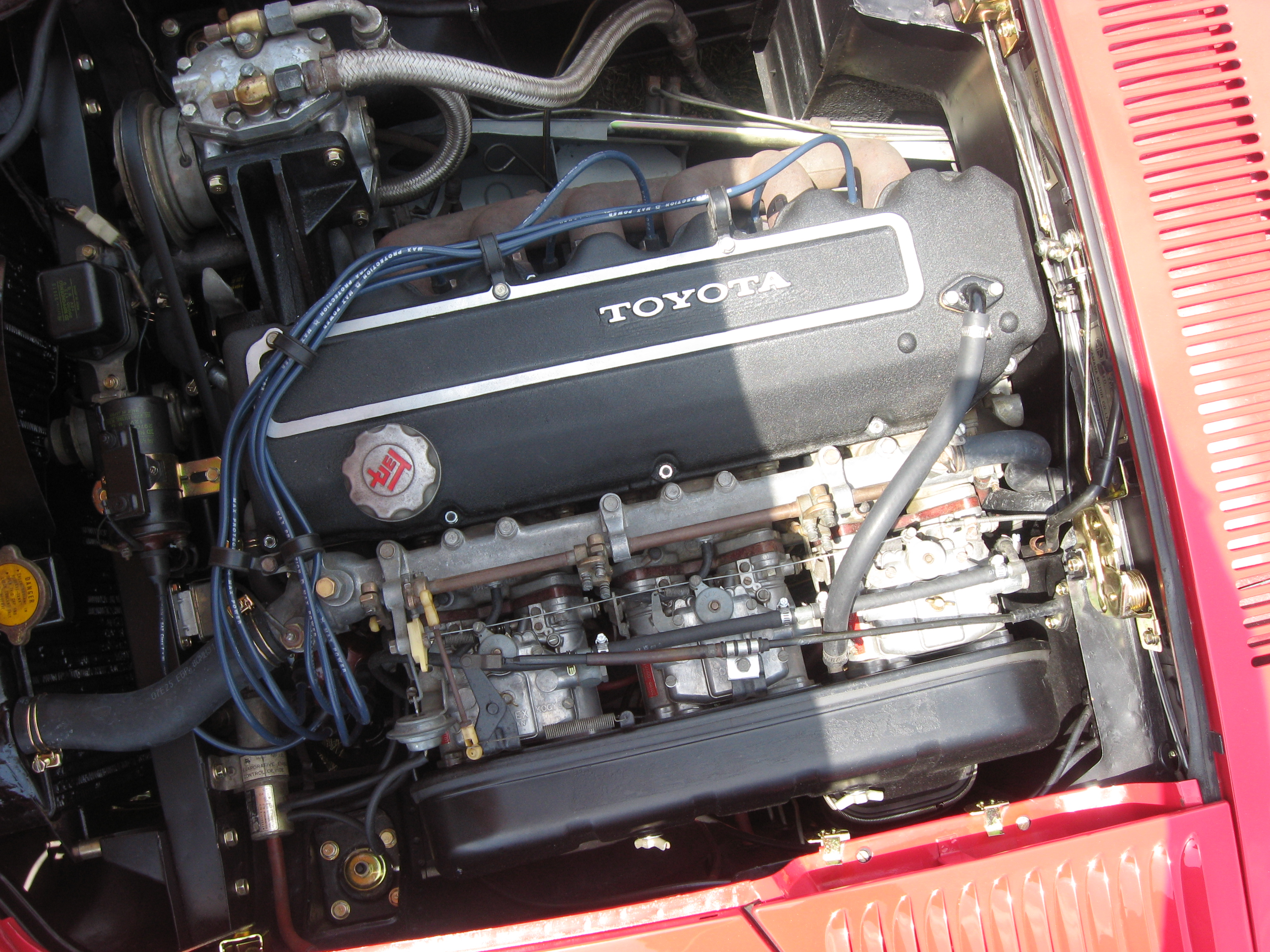
Only nine special models were fitted with the larger 2M SOHC 2.3 liter inline six

The engine was a longitudinally mounted 1,988 cc (2.0 L; 121.3 cu in) straight-6 (the 3M) sourced from the Toyota Crown (S50) sedan. It was transformed by Yamaha into a sports car engine by coupling three 2-barrel Mikuni-Solex 40 PHH carburetors to a new DOHC head that produced 150 PS (148 bhp; 110 kW) at 6,600 rpm and 175 N⋅m (129 lb⋅ft) at 5,000 rpm.

Nine special MF-12 models were also built with the larger but lower power output SOHC 2.3 L 2M-B engine, which produced 140 PS (138 bhp; 103 kW) at 5,800 rpm and 201 N⋅m (148 lb⋅ft) at 3,800 rpm of torque.

Fitted with a five-speed manual transmission, the rear-wheel-drive car was available with three different final drives. A 4.375 ratio axle car was claimed to be capable of reaching 135 mph (217 km/h) and achieve 7.59 L/100 km (31 mpg_{‑US}; 37 mpg_{‑imp}).

Both a limited-slip differential and all-around power-assisted disc brake, a first for a Japanese car, were standard. The suspension was coil springs attached to double wishbones at all four wheels installed on a backbone chassis and rode on 15-inch magnesium alloy wheels. It was also the first Toyota to offer rack and pinion steering as Toyota wanted to establish that this was a world-class sports car. The dashboard-mounted emergency brake gripped the rear discs directly should the primary braking system fail.

== Production ==
Only 337 regular production units of the 2000GT were built, figures comparable to contemporary elite Italian supercars, and according to Toyota, all 337 were sold. The first prototype was built in August 1965, only 11 months after the project had begun. Taking two years for production vehicles to finally emerge, a total of 233 MF10s, 109 MF10Ls, and nine MF12Ls were built at the Yamaha factory in Iwata, Shizuoka according to Toyota and Yamaha data, starting in May 1967 until August 1970. In America, a 1968 2000GT listed for about US$7,150 ($66,197 in 2025 dollars), a moderately higher price than competitors like the $5,539 Jaguar E-Type or the $6,790 Porsche 911S, though much lower than exotics like the $19,700 Ferrari 365 GTB/4. Toyota did not sell very many of the cars, which led to its cancellation in 1970, while it did inspire the company to introduce performance oriented "sporty" coupes that followed in the 1970s.

As a "halo car" for Toyota, it is believed that no profit was made on the 2000GT despite its high price. About 60 units reached North America and the others were similarly thinly spread worldwide. Most 2000GTs were painted either Solar Red or Pegasus White, while other colors were offered such as Thunder Silver metallic, Bellatrix Yellow, Atlantis Green, and Twilight Turquoise metallic.

Yamaha and Toyota also collaborated on another more affordable production car, again using a Toyota engine block while Yamaha developed the DOHC cylinder head, and introduced the Toyota 1600GT, using a 1967 Corona 2-door hardtop coupe. When production of the 2000GT ended, and Toyota had established a reputation of making performance oriented cars, the Celica was exclusively introduced at Toyota Corolla Store locations as the top model, again offering a 2.0L DOHC engine with a manual transmission but more affordably priced. Toyota also introduced sport coupes at each of their sales distribution networks, using the same technology in a 2-door coupe with an OHC 4-cylinder engine and a fun-to-drive approach to each car. May 1967 was also the same time the Mazda Cosmo was also introduced.

Lessons learned by Toyota and Yamaha led to the development of the Toyota 7, which was designed primarily for use in FIA Group 7 competition. It was Toyota's first purpose-built racing car.

Recognizing that the limited number of original cars may need maintenance to keep the vehicles in drivable condition, Toyota has begun reproducing new parts from original sources, and has made them available to registered owners through the GR Heritage Parts Program.

== Racing ==
Toyota entered the 2000GT in competition at home, coming third in the 1966 Japanese Grand Prix at Fuji. The 2000GT took its first win in the inaugural Suzuka 1000 Kilometres in 1966, and went on to win the 24 Hours of Fuji and the Fuji 1000 Kilometres in 1967. In addition, the car set thirteen FIA world records for speed and endurance in a 72-hour test at the Yatabe High Speed Test Track in 1966. Unfortunately, the record car was destroyed in a pace car accident and eventually scrapped. These records shortly prompted Porsche to prepare a 911R especially to beat this record.

Carroll Shelby also entered a pair of 2000GTs to compete in the 1968 SCCA production car races in the CP category. Initially Shelby built three cars, including one spare. Although it performed well, it was the only season the car competed in the US. Toyota took back one of the cars and rebuilt it into a replica of their record car, which still resides in Japan. The two remaining Shelby cars remain in the United States.

In 2022, one of the Toyota-Shelby 2000GTs sold at auction for US $2.5 million.

== 2000GT Open-Top, the "Bond Model" ==
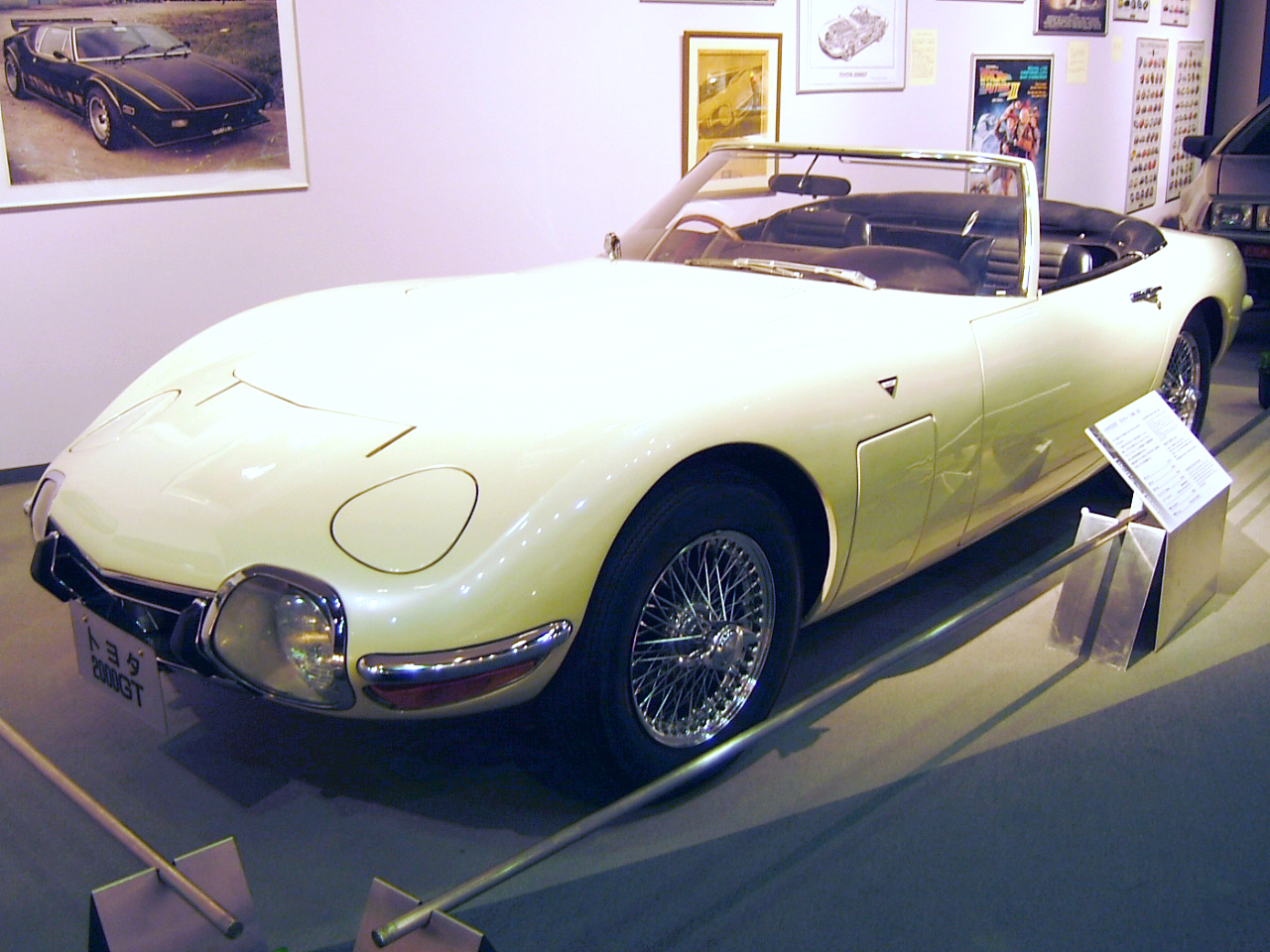
2000GT used in the James Bond film You Only Live Twice

The 2000GT made its most famous screen appearance in the 1967 James Bond movie You Only Live Twice, most of which was filmed in Japan. Two one-off topless models—fitted only with tonneau covers to simulate functioning convertible roofs—were made specially for the film. It is claimed that a targa had been considered to accommodate the burly 1.88 m (6 ft 2 in) tall Sean Connery. This retained the original car's fastback profile but eliminated rear side windows. Purportedly, Connery's head stuck out of the top and a roofless version was fabricated in less than two weeks for the movie. The car was only driven by "Bond girl" Aki (Akiko Wakabayashi) in the film.

Bond actor Daniel Craig voted the 2000GT as his favourite Bond car of all time.
