= MIV =

MIV or variation, may refer to:

- The Roman numerals for 1004
  - The year AD 1004 CE
  - A number in the 1000s range
- Moscow Institute of Oriental Studies (Russian: МИВ, romanized: MIV)
- Amdang language (ISO 639 language code: miv)
- Millville Municipal Airport (IATA airport code MIV), New Jersey, USA
- Mechanised Infantry Vehicle, a planned armoured personnel carrier for the British Army
- HMS MIV, a ship of the Royal Navy
- HNLMS MIV, a minesweeper of the Royal Netherlands Navy
- Gross-Basenach M IV, a pre-WWI German military semi-rigid airship
- Meusel M-IV, a German glider; see List of German gliders
- M.IV ("Matrix IV"), the fictional Warner Brothers videogame project inside the 2021 film The Matrix Resurrections

== See also ==
- Nieuport IV.M, a French pre-WWI monoplane
- Mitsubishi MiEV (/ˈmiːv/), an electric car
- M4 (disambiguation)
- MI5 (disambiguation)
- MLV (disambiguation)
- 1004 (disambiguation)
