= M4 =

M4 or M-4 most often refers to:

- M4 carbine, an American carbine
- M4 Sherman, an American World War II medium tank

M4, M04, or M-4 may also refer to:

== Arts and entertainment ==
- M4 (EP), a 2006 EP by Faunts
- M4 (video game), a 1992 computer game developed for the Macintosh
- M.IV ("Matrix IV"), the fictional Warner Brothers videogame project inside the 2021 film The Matrix Resurrections
- M4, the robot assistant to the character Flint in the Star Trek episode Requiem for Methuselah

== Military ==
=== Weapons ===
- Benelli M4 Super 90, an Italian semi-automatic, gas-operated shotgun
- M4 autocannon, an American 37 mm automatic gun
- M4 Selectable Lightweight Attack Munition (SLAM), an American land mine
- M4 (missile), a French submarine-launched ballistic missile from 1985
- M4 survival rifle, an American rifle in aircraft survival gear
- Spectre M4, an Italian submachine gun
- M4 bayonet, an American World War II bayonet used for the M1 Carbine
- Gross-Basenach M IV, a pre-WWI German military semi-rigid airship

=== Aircraft, ships, and vehicles ===
- HSwMS Carlskrona (M04), a 1980 Swedish Navy minelayer, later redesignated as ocean patrol vessel P04
- HSwMS M4, a Swedish Navy mine sweeper
- HMS Roberts (1915) (M4), a First World War British Royal Navy monitor
- HMS M4 (1919), a British M-class submarine
- M4 tractor, a U.S. Army artillery tractor from 1943
- Myasishchev M-4, a 1950s Soviet strategic bomber aircraft
- Meusel M-IV, a German glider; see List of German gliders

=== Other uses in military ===
- M4 flame fuel thickening compound, a substance used in fire bombs and incendiary weapons
- M4 (German Navy 4-rotor Enigma), a variant of the Enigma cryptography machine
- M04, desert variant of M05, a camouflage pattern used by the Finnish Defence Forces

== Science and technology ==
=== Biology, medicine and organic chemistry ===
- ATC code M04, Antigout preparations, a subgroup of the Anatomical Therapeutic Chemical Classification System
- British NVC community M4, a type of mire plant community in the British National Vegetation Classification system
- M4, the FAB classification of acute myelomonocytic leukemia
- Muscarinic acetylcholine receptor M_{4}, a protein

=== Computing and electronics ===
- Apple M4, a central processing unit in the Apple M series
- m4 (computer language), a macro processing language
- M4, part number for a 1N400x general purpose diode
- Sony Xperia M4 Aqua, a mobile phone
- ARM Cortex-M § Cortex-M4, a processor family
- M4 Data, a defunct British tape library manufacturer

=== Other uses in science and technology ===
- Messier 4 (M4), a globular cluster in the constellation Scorpius
- Leica M4, a 1967 35 mm camera
- M4, an ISO metric screw thread
- Foton-M No.4, a Russian microgravity and bioscience research spacecraft launched in July 2014

== Transportation ==
=== Air ===
- Covington Municipal Airport (Tennessee), FAA location identifier M04
- Maule M-4, a 1960 American four-seat cabin monoplane aircraft
- Miles M.4 Merlin, a 1930s British five-seat cabin monoplane aircraft

=== Rail ===
- Bucharest Metro Line M4, Romania
- Metro Line M4 (Budapest Metro), Metro 4 or M4, Hungary
- M4 (Copenhagen Metro), a future expansion of the Copenhagen Metro, Denmark
- M4 (Istanbul Metro), a subway line on the Asian side of Istanbul, Turkey
- M4, variant of the M2, an American electric multiple unit on the Metro-North Railroad
- M4, an American rapid transit car on the L (SEPTA Metro) line (Market–Frankford Line)
- Milan Metro Line 4, rapid transit line in Milan, Italy
- Sri Lanka Railways M4, a class of diesel-electric locomotive
- M4 (Warsaw), proposed subway line in Warsaw, Poland

=== Road ===
- List of M4 roads with the same name in many countries
- BMW M4, a car
- M4 Vacamatic, a 1941 semi-automatic transmission made by Chrysler
- M4, one of the Fifth and Madison Avenues buses, New York City, U.S.
- Mid-engine, four-wheel-drive layout, or M4 layout, an automotive design

== Other uses ==
- Héctor David Delgado Santiago (1975–2013, alias El Metro 4, sometimes M4), Mexican drug lord
- M4, a measure of money supply
- M4-, M4+ and M4x, disciplines in men's rowing
- MLBB M4 World Championship, the fourth Mobile Legends: Bang Bang World Championship held in 2023 at the conclusion of the 2022 season
- M4, a difficulty grade in mixed climbing

== See also ==
- MIV (disambiguation)
- 4M (disambiguation)
