= United Nations Security Council Resolution 1010 =

UN Security Council Resolution 1010
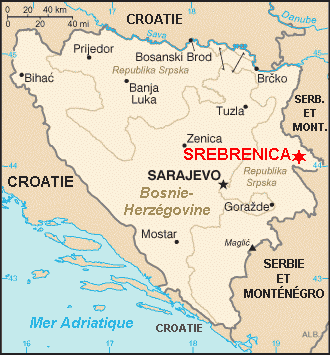
- Srebrenica within Bosnia and Herzegovina
- Date: 10 August 1995
- Meeting no.: 3,564
- Code: S/RES/1010 (Document)
- Subject: Bosnia and Herzegovina
- Voting summary: 15 voted for; None voted against; None abstained
- Result: Adopted

Security Council composition
- Permanent members: China; France; Russia; United Kingdom; United States
- Non-permanent members: Argentina; Botswana; Czech Republic; Germany; Honduras; Indonesia; Italy; Nigeria; Oman; Rwanda

United Nations Security Council resolution 1010, adopted unanimously on 10 August 1995, after recalling all resolutions on the situation in the former Yugoslavia and reaffirming Resolution 1004 (1995), the Council demanded that the Bosnian Serbs release all detained persons and permit access to them by international humanitarian organisations.

The Security Council was concerned that the Bosnian Serbs did not meet its demands. It was unacceptable that safe areas of Srebrenica and Žepa were violated by the Bosnian Serb forces. The resolution reaffirmed the council's commitment to a negotiated settlement of the conflicts in the former Yugoslavia in which the sovereignty and territorial integrity of its states were respected mutually recognised. There was also concern about violations of international humanitarian law and the disappearance of civilians in Srebrenica and in Žepa. The Bosnian Serb party was condemned in this regard for not giving access to the civilians by the International Committee of the Red Cross (ICRC).

The Council demanded that the Bosnian Serbs allow detained persons to receive access by the ICRC and United Nations High Commissioner for Refugees and respect the rights of detained persons and called for their release. All those who committed violations of international humanitarian law would be held individually responsible. Finally, the Secretary-General was asked to report back by 1 September 1995 concerning compliance with this resolution.

== See also ==
- Army of the Republika Srpska
- Bosnian Genocide
- Bosnian War
- Breakup of Yugoslavia
- Croatian War of Independence
- List of United Nations Security Council Resolutions 1001 to 1100 (1995–1997)
- Yugoslav Wars
