= List of M4 roads =

This is a list of roads designated M4:

- M4 (East London), a Metropolitan Route in East London, South Africa
- M4 (Cape Town), a Metropolitan Route in Cape Town, South Africa
- M4 (Pretoria), a Metropolitan Route in Pretoria, South Africa
- M4 (Durban), a Metropolitan Route in Durban, South Africa
- M4 (Port Elizabeth), a Metropolitan Route in Port Elizabeth, South Africa
- M4 motorway, United Kingdom
- M4 motorway (Hungary), or 2/A
- M4 motorway (Ireland)
- M-4 (Michigan highway), U.S.
- M4 motorway (Pakistan)
- M4 highway (Russia)
- M4 Motorway (Sydney), New South Wales, Australia
- Port of Brisbane Motorway, the M4 in Queensland, Australia
- West Gate Tunnel, the M4 motorway in Victoria, Australia
- Highway M04 (Ukraine)
- M-4 highway (Montenegro)
- M4 Motorway (Syria)
- M4 road (Zambia)
- M4 road (Malawi)

== See also ==
- List of highways numbered 4
