= Toyota M engine =

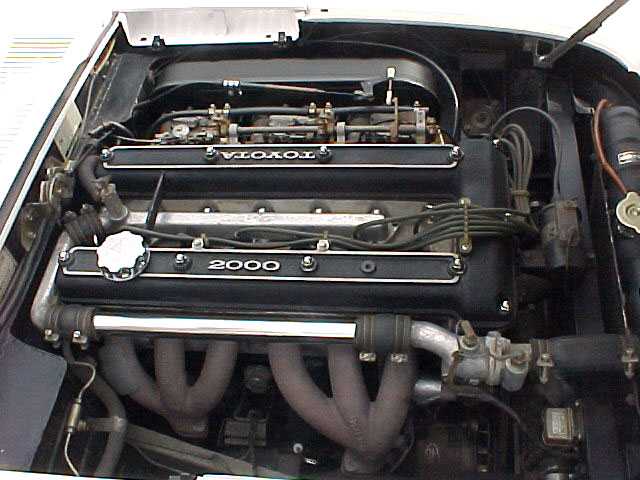

Overview
- Manufacturer: Toyota
- Production: 1965–1993

Layout
- Configuration: Straight-6
- Cylinder block material: Cast iron
- Cylinder head material: Aluminum

Combustion
- Cooling system: Water-cooled

Chronology
- Successor: Toyota JZ engine, Toyota G engine

Toyota Motor Corporation's M family of engines were a longitudinally mounted straight-6 engine design. They were used from the 1960s through the 1990s. All M family engines were OHC designs. While the M family was born with a chain-driven single camshaft it evolved into a belt-driven DOHC system after 1980. All M family engines used a cast-iron block with an aluminum cylinder head, and were built at the Toyota Kamigo plant in Toyota City, Japan.

The M-E variant, available only in the Japanese domestic market, was the first Toyota engine to be equipped with fuel injection (around the same time as the 4-cylinder 18R-E). The 4M-E was the first Toyota engine to be equipped with fuel injection for non-Japanese markets. The M family were Toyota's most prestigious engines (apart from the uncommon V family V8) for over 30 years. They were commonly found on the large Toyota Crown, Mark II, and Supra models.

== M ==
=== M ===
The first M was a 2.0 L (1,988 cc) version produced from 1965 through 1988. It was a 2-valve SOHC engine. Cylinder bore and stroke was square at 75 mm (2.95 in). Output was 110–115 PS (108–113 bhp; 81–85 kW) at 5,200 to 5600 rpm, depending on specifications and model year. Typical torque is 157 N⋅m (116 lb⋅ft; 16 kg⋅m) at 3,800 rpm.

The "M-C" engine, for commercial vehicles such as the Crown Van produces 105 PS (104 bhp; 77 kW).

Twin sidedraft SU Carburettors pushed output for the M-B and M-D to 125 PS (123 bhp; 92 kW) at 5,800 rpm.

Anti emissions versions, the M-U and M-EU, replaced the M and M-E on the Japanese market in mid 1976. The emissions system was called TTC (Toyota Total Clean), with a "-C" to denote the installation of a catalytic converter. For commercial vehicles, the emissions controlled carburetted version was called the M-J.

Applications (calendar years):

- 1962–1967 Toyota Crown MS40 (second generation)
- 1967–1971 Toyota Crown MS50 (third generation)
- 1971–1974 Toyota Crown MS60/62/70 (fourth generation)
- 1974–1979 Toyota Crown MS80/82/87/90/100/102/107 (fifth generation)
- 1979–1983 Toyota Crown MS117V (seventh generation)
- 1972–1979 Toyota Corona Mark II X10/20/30/40 (second generation)

=== M-P ===
An LPG version, the M-P and M-PU was produced from 1966 through 1989. The earliest models were simply called the M-LPG, with the emissions scrubbed M-PU replacing it in mid-1976.

- 1983–1987 Toyota Crown MS120 (seventh generation)
- 1987–1989 Toyota Crown MS130 (eighth generation)

=== M-E ===
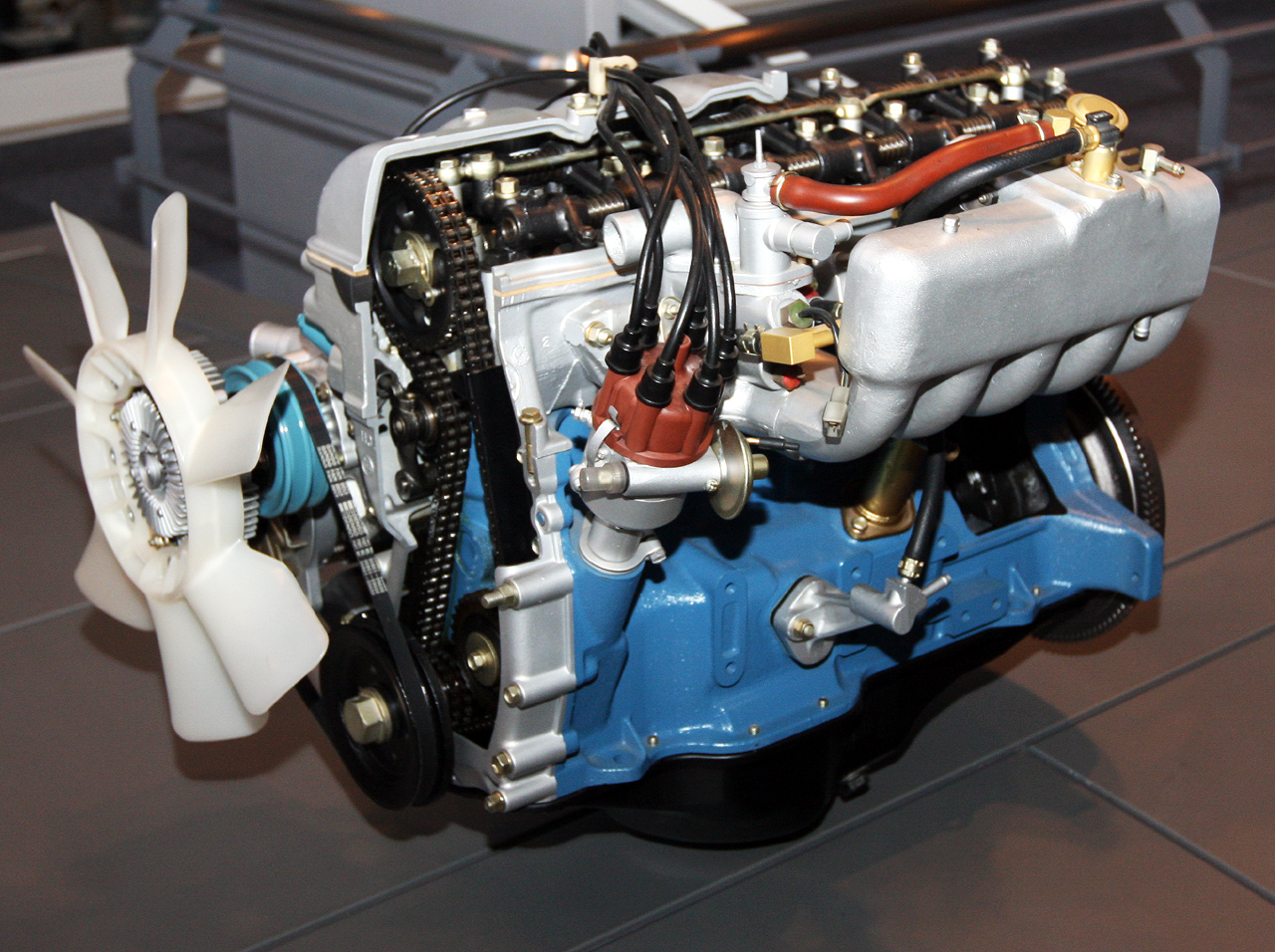
1973 Toyota M-E engine.

The M-E fuel injected induction system appeared in the 1973–1976 Toyota Mark II (X10) "LG" sedan and hardtop as sold in Japan. It was not sold outside Japan.

The M-E was redesignated as the M-EU for the Japanese market in December 1976 when it received the TTC-C (Toyota Total Clean), catalytic converter to meet anti-emissions laws.

Applications (calendar years):

- 1973–1980 Toyota Mark II (X10) L and LG sedan and hardtop
- 1977-1980 Toyota Chaser (X30) SG Touring, SGS, GS sedan and hardtop

=== M-TEU ===
The turbocharged M-TEU appeared in 1980 with 145 bhp (147 PS; 108 kW) at 5,600 rpm and 211 N⋅m (156 lb⋅ft; 21.5 kg⋅m) at 3,000 rpm. It used a Garret T-03 turbo.

In 1983, Toyota added an air/water intercooler to the M-TEU. Output was bumped to 160 bhp (162 PS; 119 kW) at 5,600 rpm and 230 N⋅m (170 lb⋅ft; 23.5 kg⋅m) at 3,000 rpm.

Applications (calendar years):

- 1980 Toyota Supra MA46
- 1980 Toyota Soarer MZ10
- 1980 Toyota Crown
- 1980 Toyota Corona Mark II
- 1982–1986 Toyota Celica XX (Japan)

== 2M ==
The 2-valve SOHC 2M was stroked to 85 mm (3.35 in) for 2.3 L (2,253 cc). It was produced from November 1966 to September 1974. Output was 81–86 kW (109–115 bhp) at 5,200 rpm and 159–172 N⋅m (117–127 lb⋅ft; 16.2–17.5 kg⋅m) at 3,600 rpm.

Applications (calendar years):

- Crown MS45/47 (November 1966 – August 1967)
- Crown MS51/53/55/57 (September 1967 – January 1971)
- Crown MS64/67 (February 1971 – September 1974)
- Corona Mark II MX12/22/28 (1972–74)
- 2000GT MF12
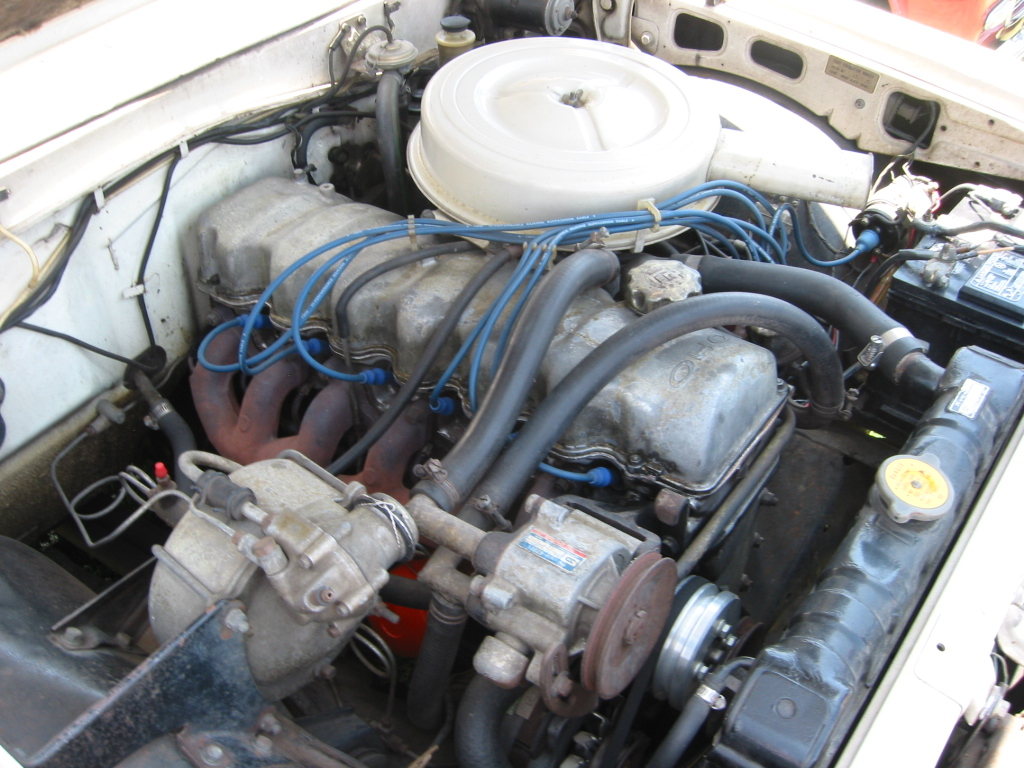
2M in a Crown

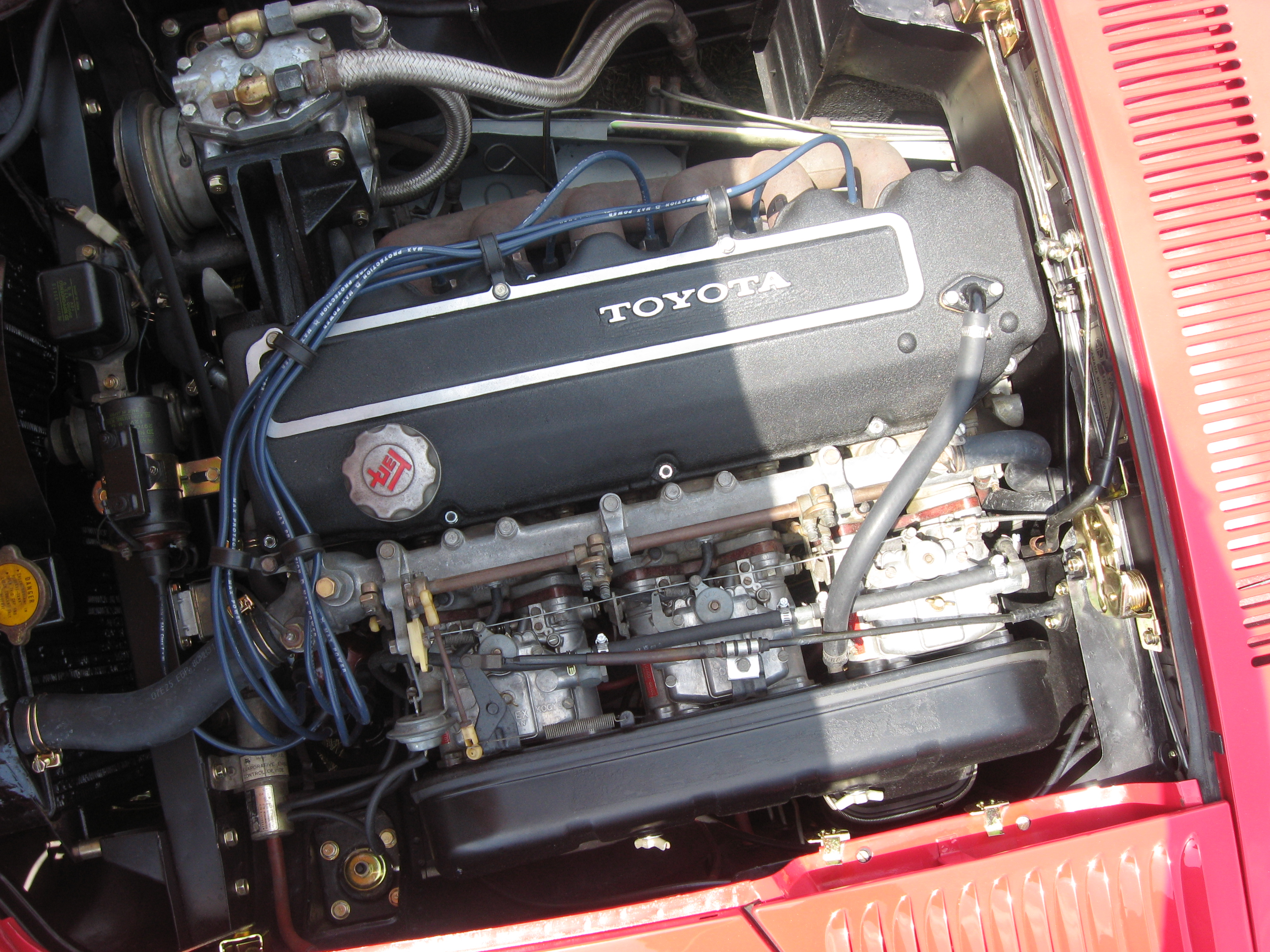
2M in the 2000GT (MF12)

== 3M ==
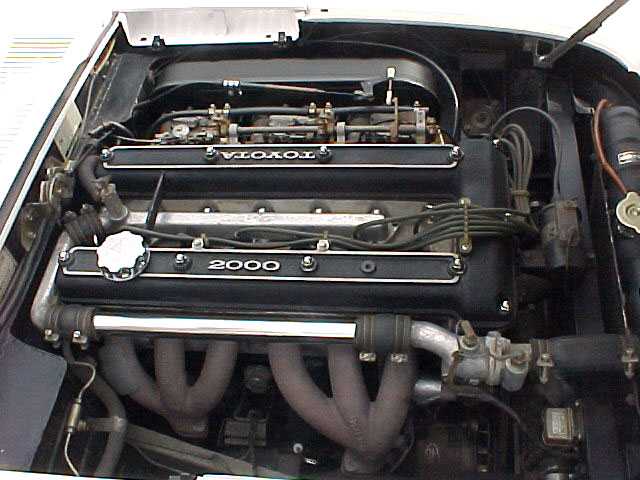
3M 2.0 Liter inline six

Another 1,988 cc (2.0 L; 121.3 cu in) naturally aspirated inline 6, with both squared bore and stroke of 75 mm (2.95 in) and equipped with 3 Mikuni-Solex 40 PHH carburetors, the 2 valves per cylinder DOHC 3M, was produced from 1966 through 1971. This special engine shared the original M's block but featured an aluminum sump, a special Yamaha-designed aluminum head with wide 79° valves and a hemispherical shape. It powered the Yamaha/Toyota MF10 2000GT, which 'Import Tuner' magazine has described as "the first true original Japanese supercar". Output was 150 PS (148 hp; 110 kW) at 6,600 rpm and 175 N⋅m (129 lb⋅ft; 17.8 kg⋅m) at 5,000 rpm and a Compression ratio of 8.4:1.

Applications (calendar years):

- Toyota 2000GT MF10

== 4M ==
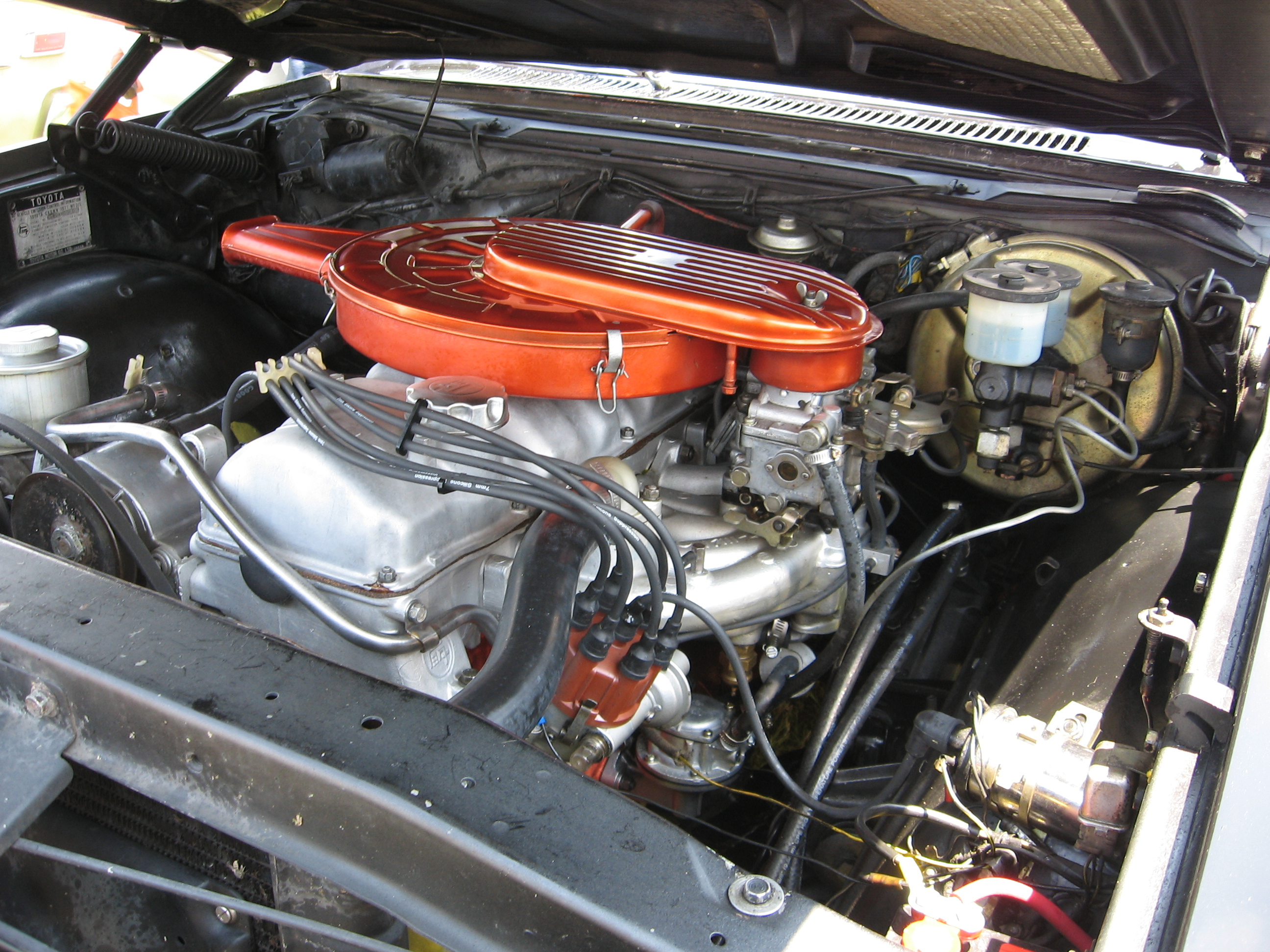
Toyota 4M engine.

The engine was bored out to 80 mm (3.15 in) to create the 2.6 L (2,563 cc) 2-valve SOHC 4M. Produced from 1972 through 1980, output was 108–123 bhp (109–125 PS; 81–92 kW) at 5,600 rpm and 181–191 N⋅m (134–141 lb⋅ft; 18.5–19.5 kg⋅m) at 3,600 rpm.

The fuel-injected 4M-E was produced from 1978 through 1980. It was also a 2-valve SOHC engine. Output was 110 bhp (112 PS; 82 kW) at 4,800 rpm and 184 N⋅m (136 lb⋅ft; 18.8 kg⋅m) at 2,400 rpm.

Applications (calendar years):

- 1978–1980 Toyota Supra
- 1974–1980 Corona Mark II/Cressida
- 1971–1979 Toyota Crown

== 5M ==
The bore was up again to 83.1 mm (3.27 in) in the 2.8 L (2,759 cc) 5M, produced from 1979 through 1988. Although 2-valve SOHC and carbureted versions were made, it is the fuel-injected DOHC 5M-GE that is the most common.

The original federalized version of the SOHC engine produced just 116 hp (118 PS; 87 kW) at 4,800 rpm and 196 N⋅m (145 lb⋅ft; 20 kg⋅m) at 3,600 rpm.

In Australia the 5M-E (in 1985) had 103 kW (140 PS; 138 bhp) at 4,800 rpm and 226 N⋅m (166 lb⋅ft; 23 kg⋅m) at 3,600 rpm due to the particular emissions standards at the time. This engine was used in the Supra in Australia as well as Sweden and Switzerland, while Swiss buyers were also offered this engine in the Cressida and the Crown.

In Europe (aside from Sweden and Switzerland, who received the same spec engine as Australia) the 5M-E produced 145 PS (143 bhp; 107 kW) in the Crown MS112 and the Celica Supra MA61.

Applications (calendar years):

- 5M
  - Toyota Crown MS112, MS122, MS132
- 5M-EU (Japan), 5M-E
  - 1979–1989 Toyota Crown MS112, MS122, MS133
  - 1980–1986 Toyota Celica Supra MA47, MA56, MA61
  - 1980–1984 Toyota Cressida MX62/63
  - 1984–1988 Toyota Cressida MX72/73
  - 1988–1993 Toyota Cressida MX82

== 5M-GE ==
The 12-valve (2 valves per cylinder) DOHC 5M-GE is familiar as the engine of the Toyota Supra and Toyota Cressida of the 1980s. It was quite different from any previous member of the M family, with Bosch L-Jetronic-derived electronic fuel-injection (using an AFM intake measuring scheme), wide-angle valves, and belt-driven dual camshafts. It used hydraulic valve lifters, a first for Toyota. The use of rocker arms and valve lash adjusters eliminated the need for valve clearance maintenance, a world first for any twin cam engine. This version of the M made its US debut in 1982's Toyota Celica Supra MK2. The 1982 version had a vacuum-advance distributor, whereas the 1983–1988 versions found in the Celica Supra and Cressida had full electronic control of the ignition system and distributor. The newer engine control system found in these later cars was named TCCS, or Toyota Computer Control System and, together with different intake runners, increased max power by 5 PS (5 bhp; 4 kW) from August 1983.

Output ranged from 145 to 175 bhp (108 to 130 kW), depending on exhaust system, emissions controls, compression ratio, intake runner shape (earlier models had round intake runners and later models had D-shaped intake runners), and ECU tuning.

There were aftermarket crank and piston kits offered for the 5M-GE that took the displacement up to 2.9 L for 230 bhp (172 kW) and 3.1 L for 250 bhp (186 kW). Outfitted with kits like the Kuwahara 3100, these engines were often used quite successfully in powerboat racing in the mid-1980s.

Specifications:

- Valvetrain: DOHC 2 valves per cylinder
- Forced Induction: None
- Displacement: 2,759 cc (2.8 L; 168.4 cu in)
- Bore x stroke: 83 mm × 85 mm (3.27 in × 3.35 in)
- Compression Ratio: 8.1:1 to 9.2:1
- Power: 145–175 hp (108–130 kW)
- Torque: 190–230 N⋅m (140–170 lb⋅ft; 19.4–23.5 kg⋅m)
- Production: 1982–1988

Applications (calendar years):

- 1981.07–1986 Toyota Celica XX/Supra MA61
- 1982–1988 Toyota Cressida MX62, MX63, MX72, MX73
- 1981.08–1984.08 Toyota Crown MS120
- 1981.02–1983.08 Toyota Soarer MZ11

Differences between years on US model of the Celica Supra:

- 1982 Supra 5M-GE had vacuum-advance distributors and 9-to-0 volt output AFMs.
- 1982–1983 Supra 5M-GE had dual V-belt accessory drive, 65 amp alternator, square-tooth camshaft belts, 8.8:1 compression ratio, shallower oil pan, and round intake runners.
- 1983–1985.5 Supra 5M-GE had 0- to 5-volt output AFM's and TCCS.
- 1984–1985.5 Supra 5M-GE had 7-rib serpentine accessory drive belts, 60 amp alternator, round-tooth camshaft belts, 9.2:1 compression ratio, knock sensor, deeper oil pan, and D-shaped intake runners.

== 6M-GE ==
Toyota increased the 5M-GE's stroke to 91 mm (3.58 in) to create the 3.0 L (2,954 cc) 6M-GE. This necessitated the fitment of larger diameter intake runners 37 mm (1.46 in) versus 35 mm (1.38 in). Only produced in 12-valve (2 valves per cylinder) DOHC/fuel-injected versions, it was available as the 6M-GE and Japan-spec 6M-GEU from 1984 through 1987. The 6M engine used the same crank, machined to accept a different torsional damper, as the 1986–1989 7M-GE and 7M-GTE engines; this fact is witnessed by the designation "6M" stamped on the counterweight of the crank on the earlier 1986–1988 7M engines.

Output was 170–190 bhp (172–193 PS; 127–142 kW) at 5,600 rpm and 230–260 N⋅m (170–192 lb⋅ft; 23.5–26.5 kg⋅m) at 4,400 rpm. The 6M-GEU is usually the lower powered variant of 6M engines, due to more restrictive exhaust and increased emissions-control hardware. Even though it was never offered in US-market vehicles, it is sometimes imported from countries where it was available and transplanted into US-market Celica Supras and MX63 and MX73 Cressidas, since it is externally identical to the 5M-GE.

Applications (calendar years):

- Toyota Crown
- Toyota Soarer (MZ12)

== 7M-GE ==
The Toyota 7M-GE introduced in the early months of 1986 is a 2,954 cc (3.0 L) 24-valve (4 valves per cylinder) DOHC/fuel-injected engine. The valves are spaced at a performance-oriented 50° angle. Cylinder bore and stroke is 83 mm × 91 mm (3.27 in × 3.58 in).

The 7M-GE was produced from 1986 through 1992. Output was 190–204 bhp (193–207 PS; 142–152 kW) at 6,000 rpm and 250–265 N⋅m (184–195 lb⋅ft; 25.5–27 kg⋅m) at 3,600 rpm.

Specifications:

- Displacement: 2,954 cc (3.0 L; 180.3 cu in)
- Bore x stroke: 83 mm × 91 mm (3.27 in × 3.58 in)
- Compression Ratio: 9.1:1
- Weight: 199 kg (439 lb)

Applications (calendar years):

- 1986–1992 Toyota Supra MkIII (MA70)
- 1989–1992 Toyota Cressida Mark II (MX83)
- Toyota Chaser
- Toyota Crown
- Toyota Cressida 3.0i Twincam/3.0GLS (MX75) South Africa only
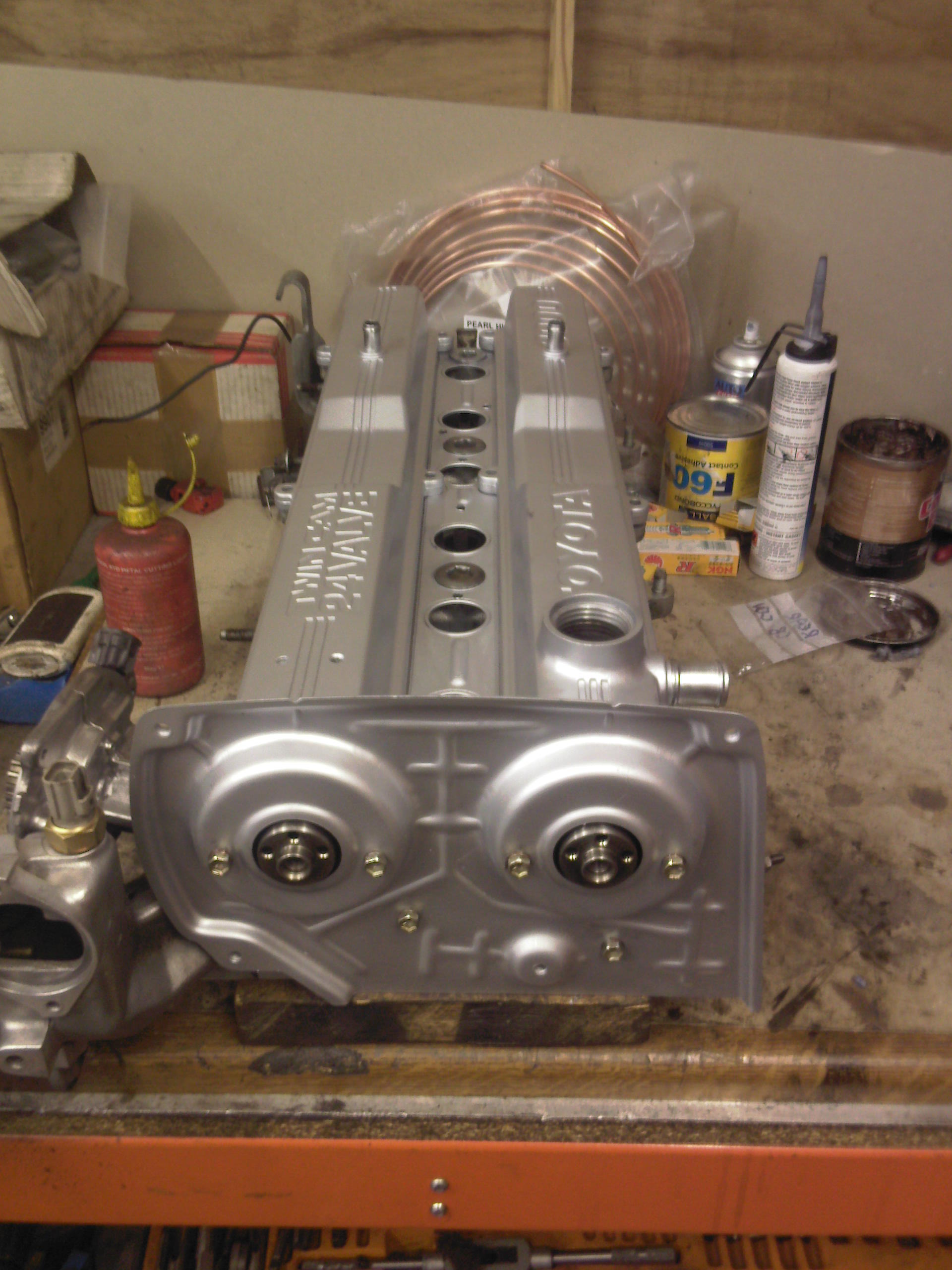
Cylinder head from front

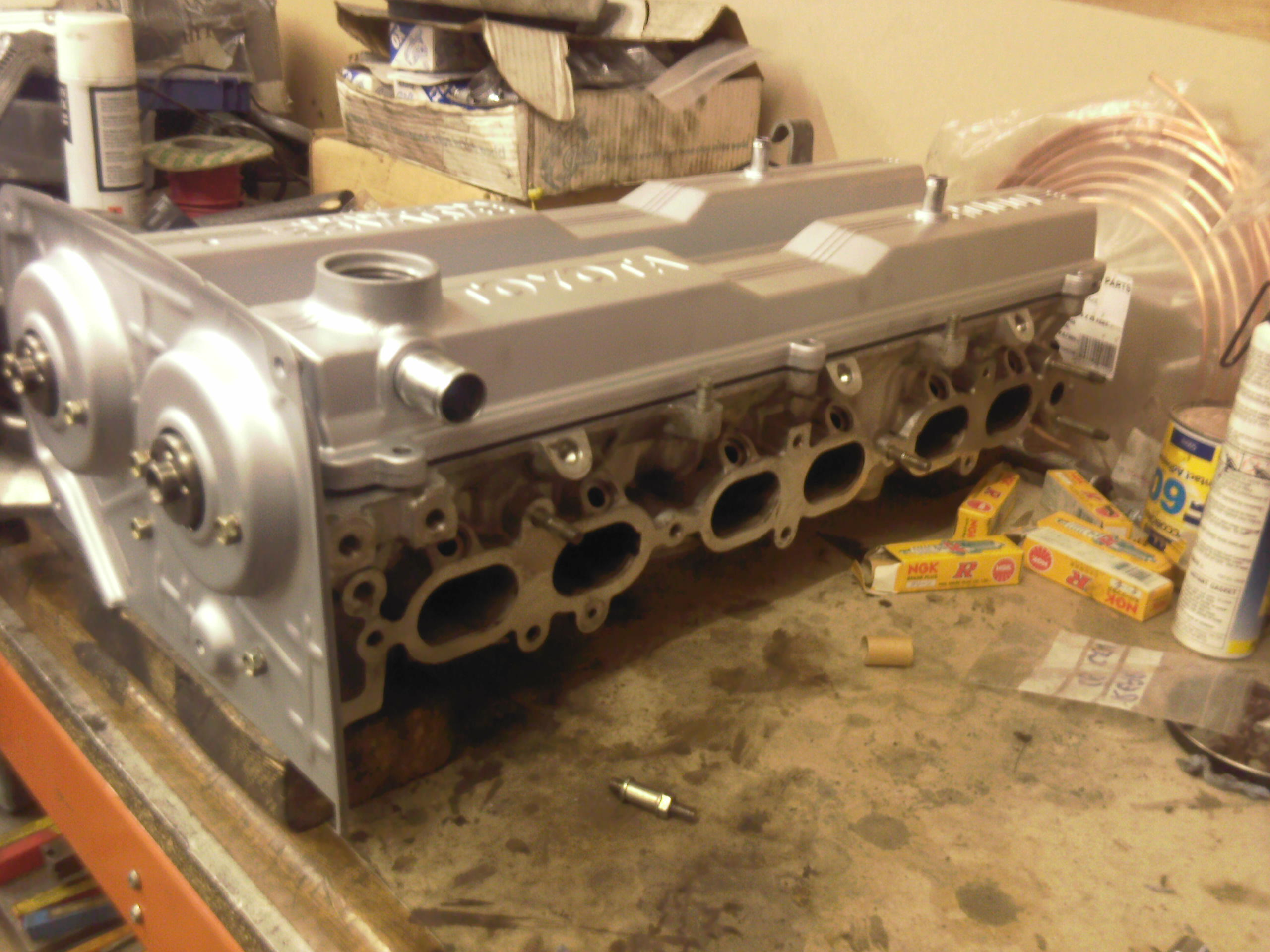
Inlet side of cylinder head

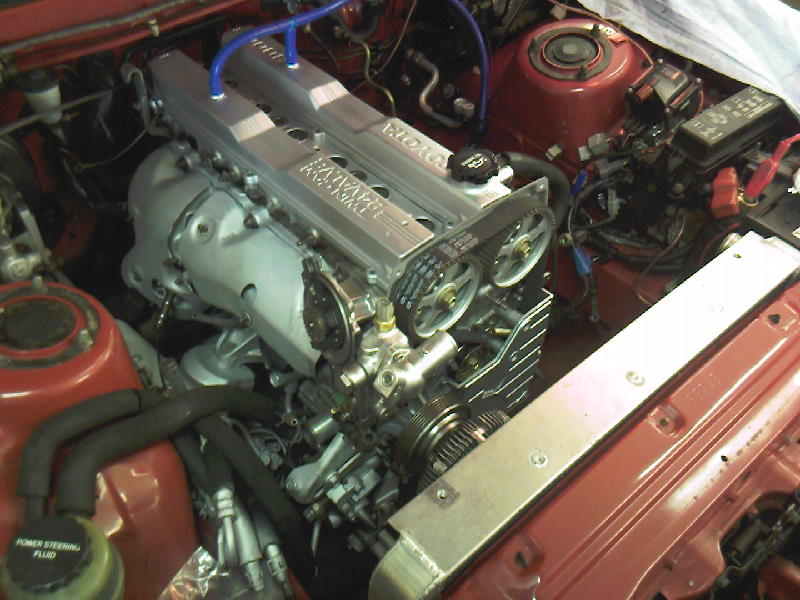
Partially built 7MGE

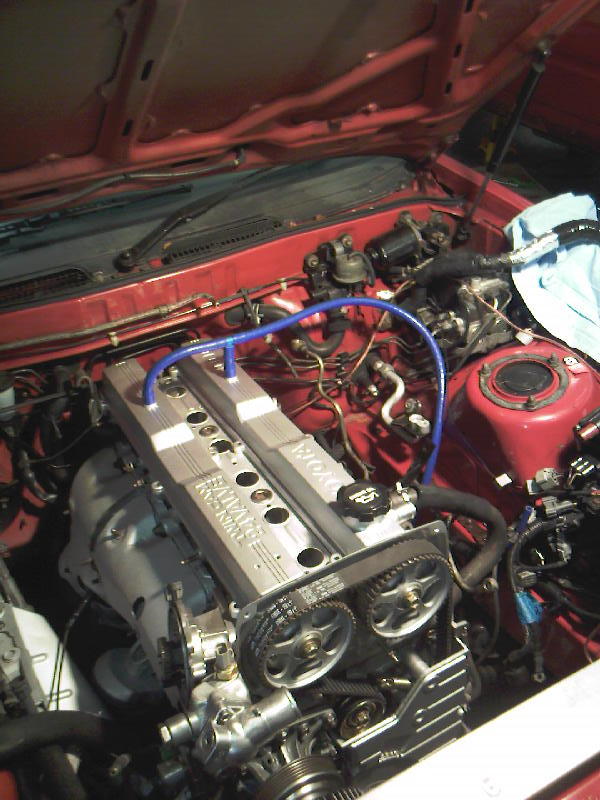
Partially built 7MGE

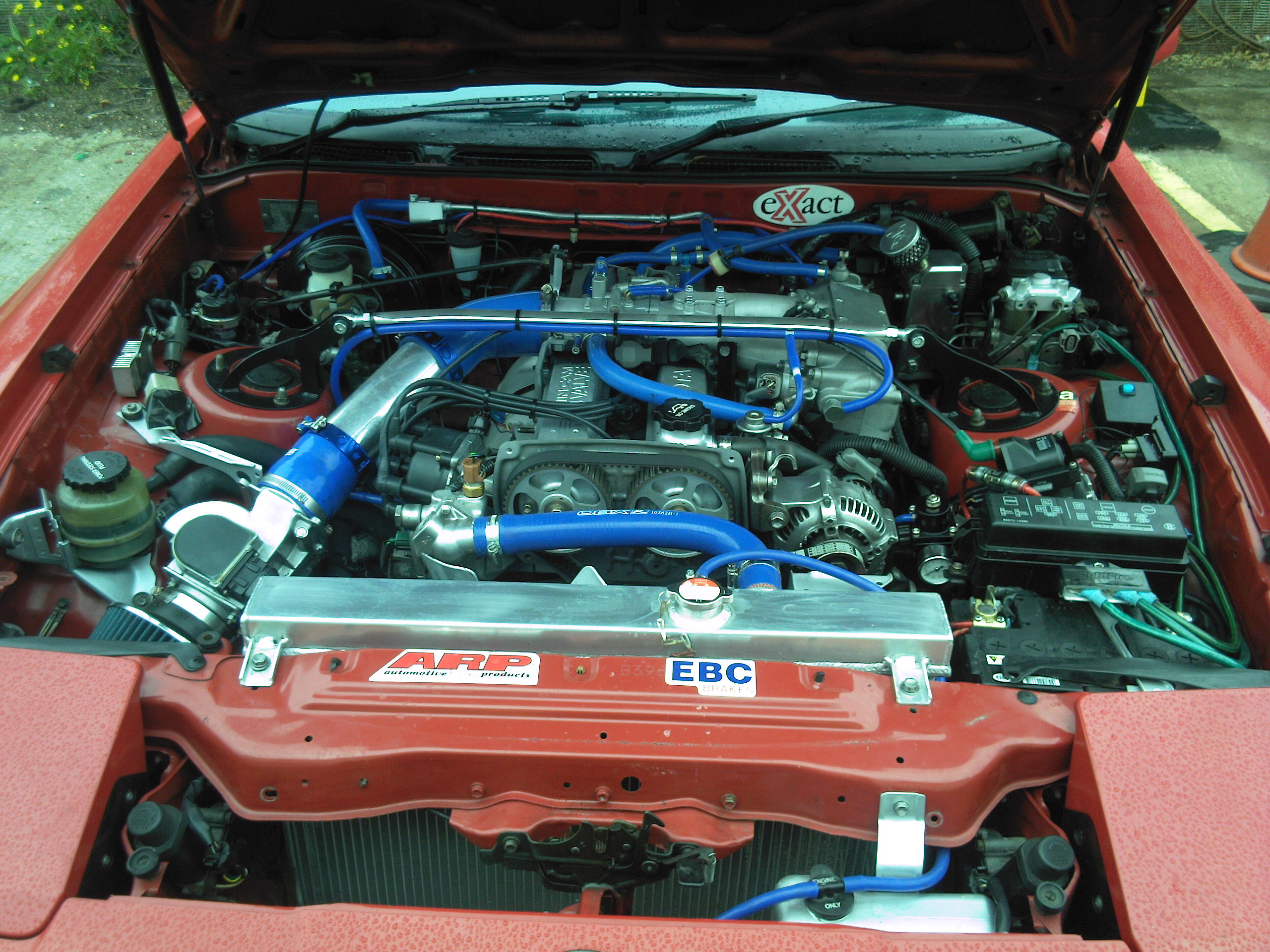
Modified 7MGE engine

== 7M-GTE ==
The turbocharged 7M-GTE was produced from 1986 to 1992. Output was 232 hp (173 kW; 235 PS) at 5,600 rpm and 344 N⋅m (254 lb⋅ft; 35.1 kg⋅m) at 3,200 rpm for most 5 psi (0.34 bar) versions. It was Toyota's top performance engine until it was replaced by the JZ-series engines.

Toyota produced a variant of the existing Japanese-market 7M-GTEU which featured a modified CT26 high-flow turbocharger and large volume intercooler, pushed output to 267 hp (199 kW) at 5,600 rpm and 358 N⋅m (264 lb⋅ft; 36.5 kg⋅m) at 4,400 rpm. This was used only in the racing homologation Toyota Supra Turbo A road and race cars. The Turbo A models also measured air based on manifold pressure rather than using an air flow meter, had a larger intercooler, larger throttle body, optimized CT-26 turbo, and various other differences. It was one of the fastest Japanese cars at the time. The homologation was for the Group A series. The Group A Supra with a 7M-GTE and CT26 turbo produced 433 kW (580 bhp).

Specifications:

- Displacement: 2,954 cc (3.0 L; 180.3 cu in)
- Bore x stroke: 83 mm × 91 mm (3.27 in × 3.58 in)
- Compression Ratio: 8.4:1
- Weight: 210 kg (463 lb)

Applications (calendar years):

- 1987–1992 Toyota Supra (MA70)
- 1986–1991 Toyota Soarer (MZ20/MZ21)
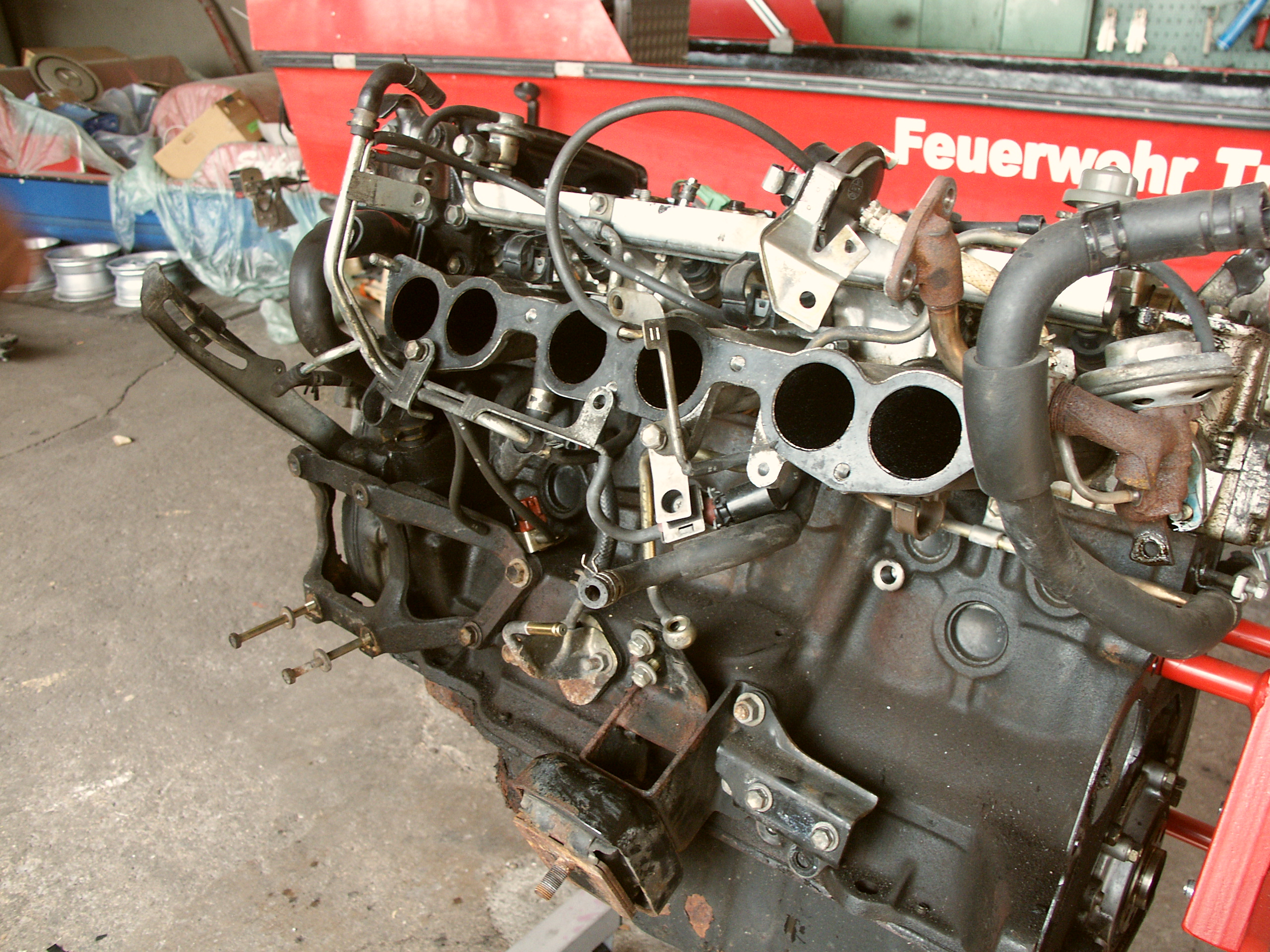
left side view

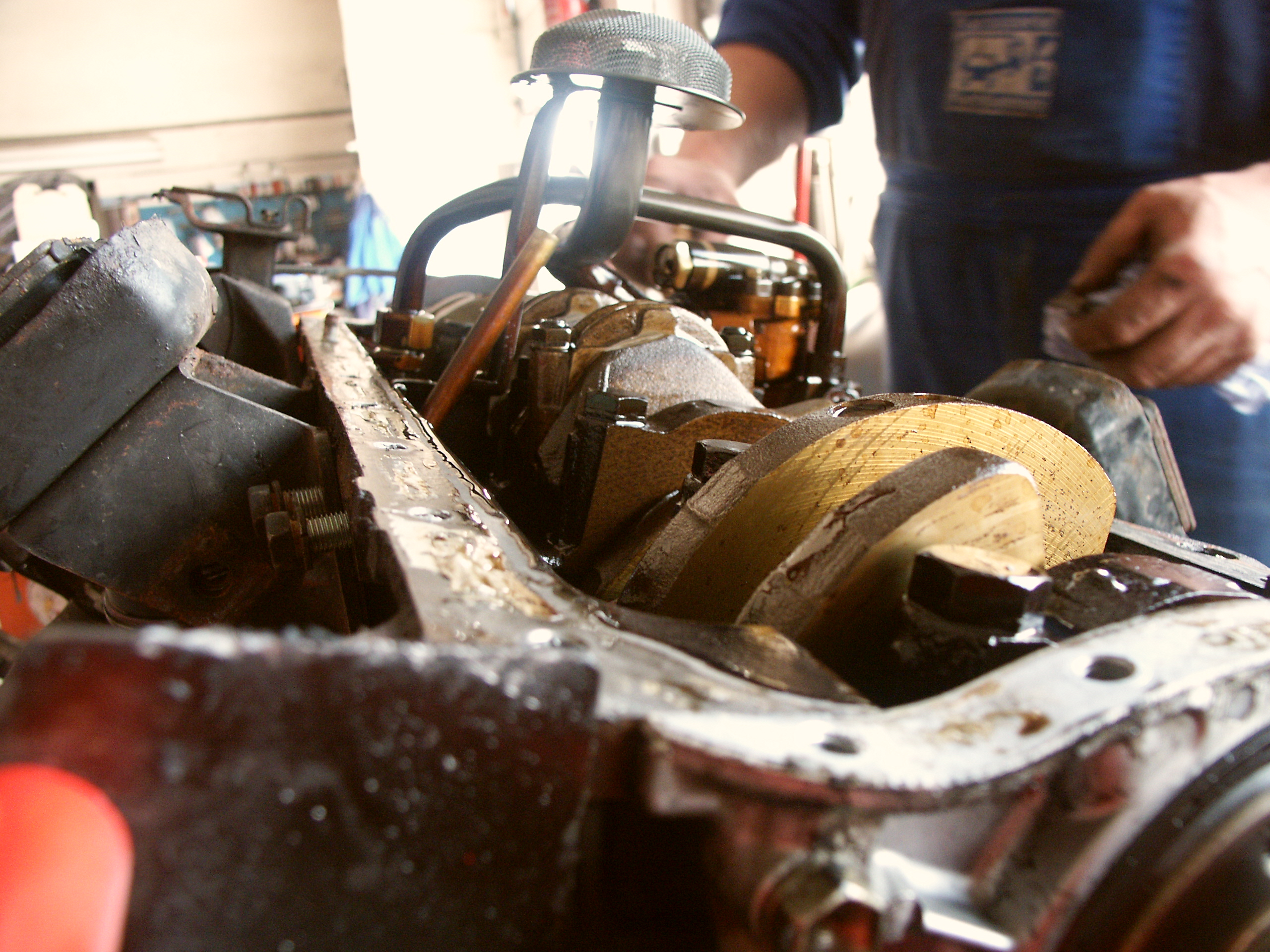
View of bottom end, with crankshaft and oil pump pickup

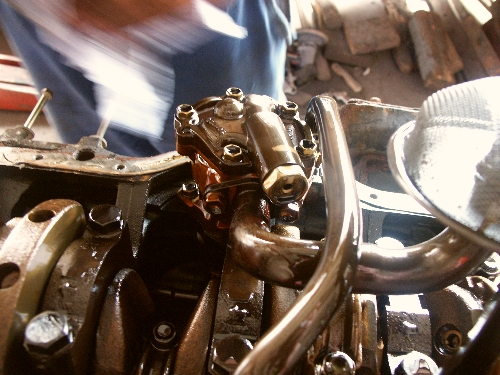
oil pump and internals

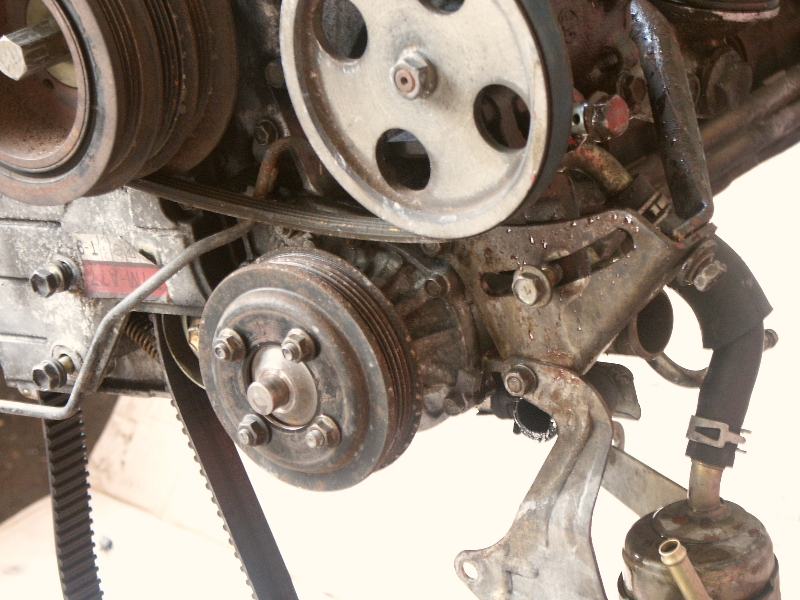
front part, upside down

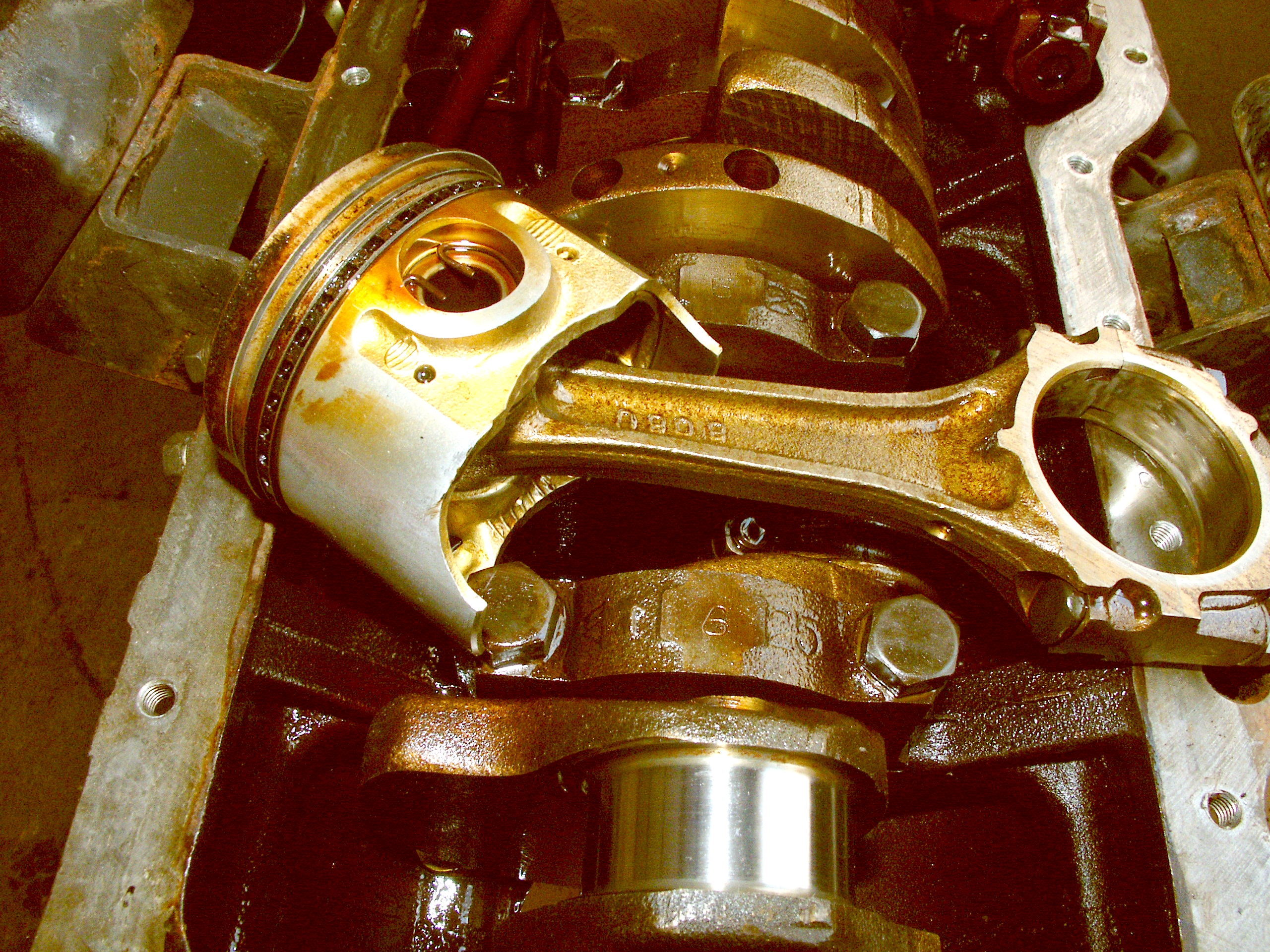
piston with rod on top of engine

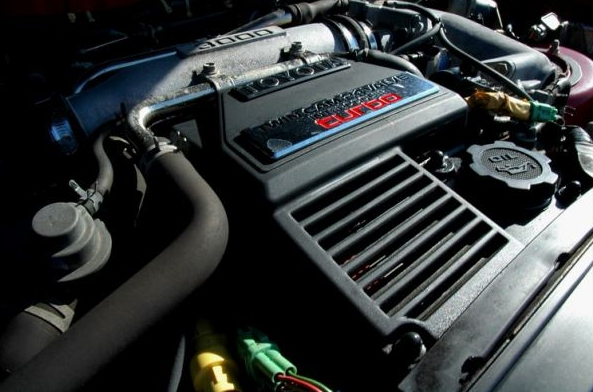
engine mounted and running

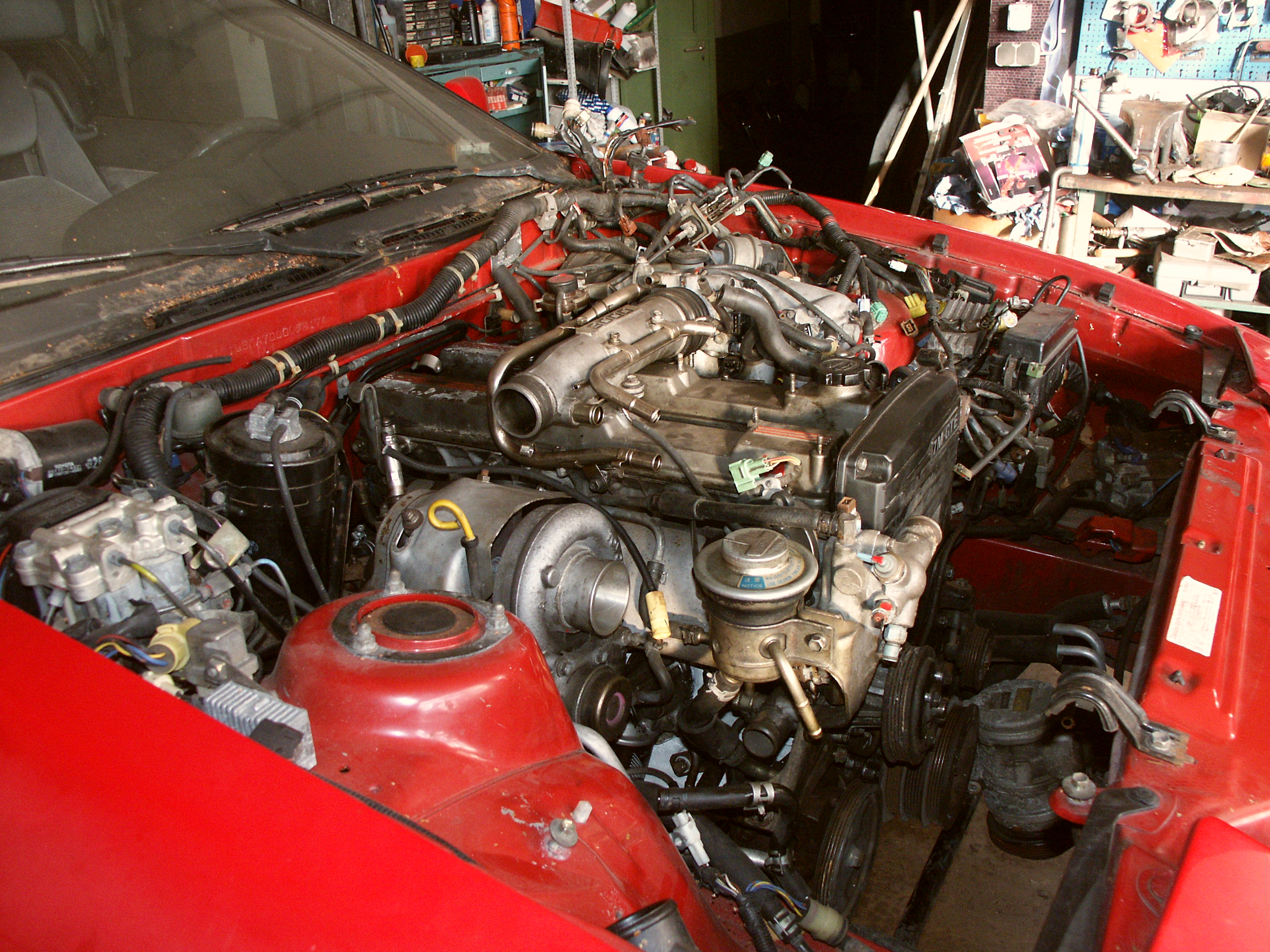
engine in bay, refurbished partially

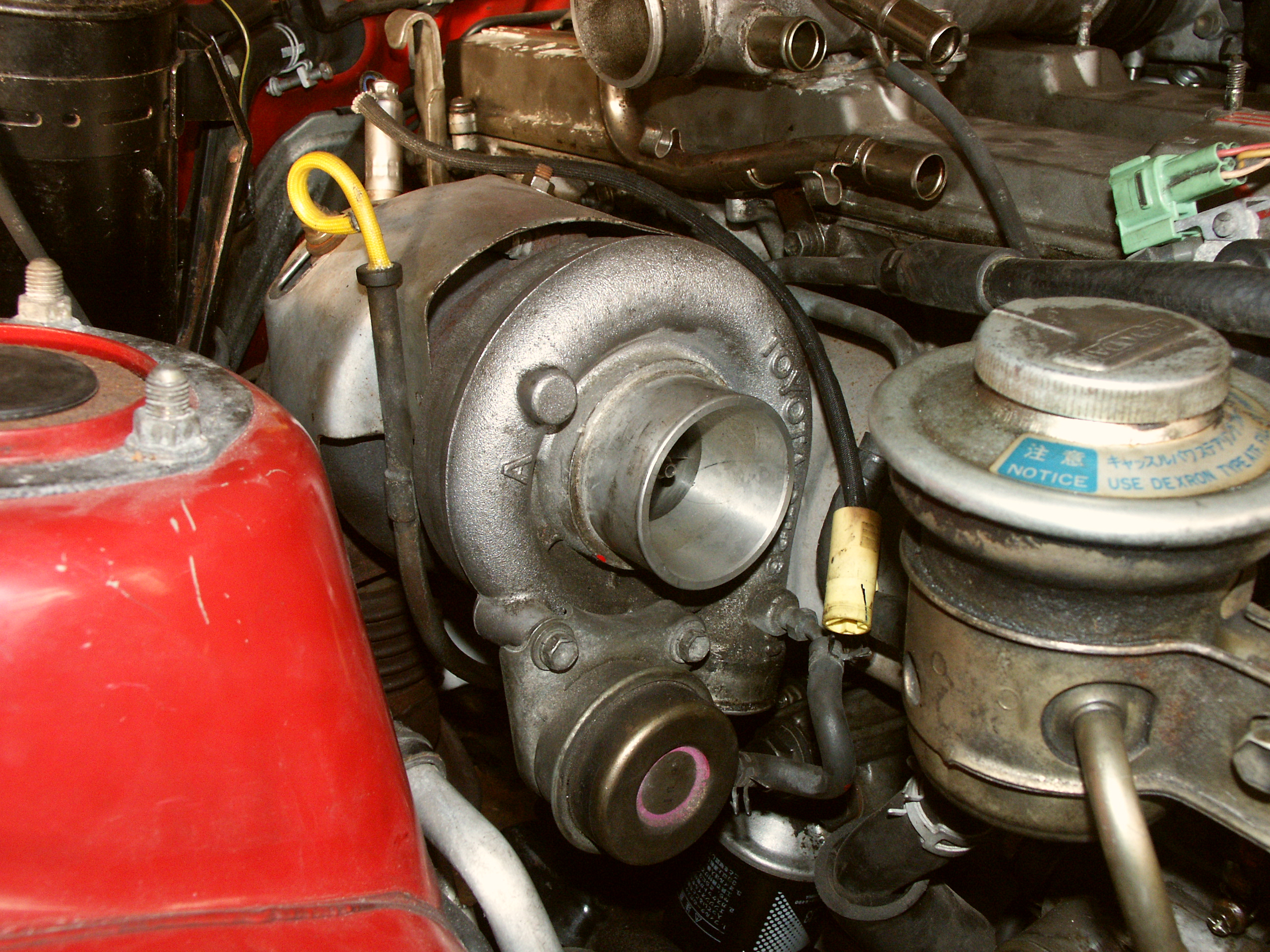
CT 26 standard turbocharger

== See also ==
- List of Toyota engines
- Toyota UZ engine
- Toyota JZ engine
