= Nissan Silvia =

Sports car manufactured by Nissan

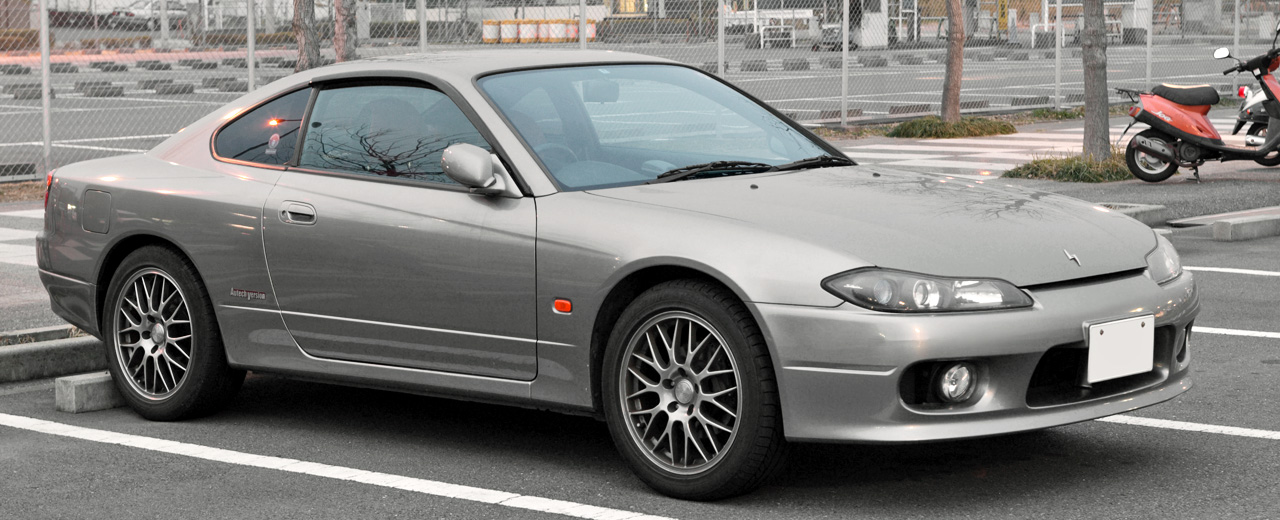
- Nissan Silvia Autech Version (S15, Japan)

Overview
- Manufacturer: Nissan
- Production: 1965–1968; 1975–2002

Body and chassis
- Class: Sports car
- Layout: Front-engine, rear-wheel-drive

The Nissan Silvia (Japanese: 日産・シルビア, Hepburn: Nissan Shirubia) is the series of small sports cars produced by Nissan. Versions of the Silvia have been marketed as the 200SX or 240SX for export, with some export versions being sold under the Datsun brand.

The Gazelle was the twin-model of Silvia sold in Japan at different dealerships for the S110 and S12 generations; the Gazelle name was also used in Australia for the S12 generation. For the S13 generation in Japan, the Gazelle was replaced with the 180SX, which was a hatchback model of the Silvia with pop-up headlights that was also sold as the 200SX and 240SX for export purposes.

== CSP311 ==
Nissan Silvia (CSP311)
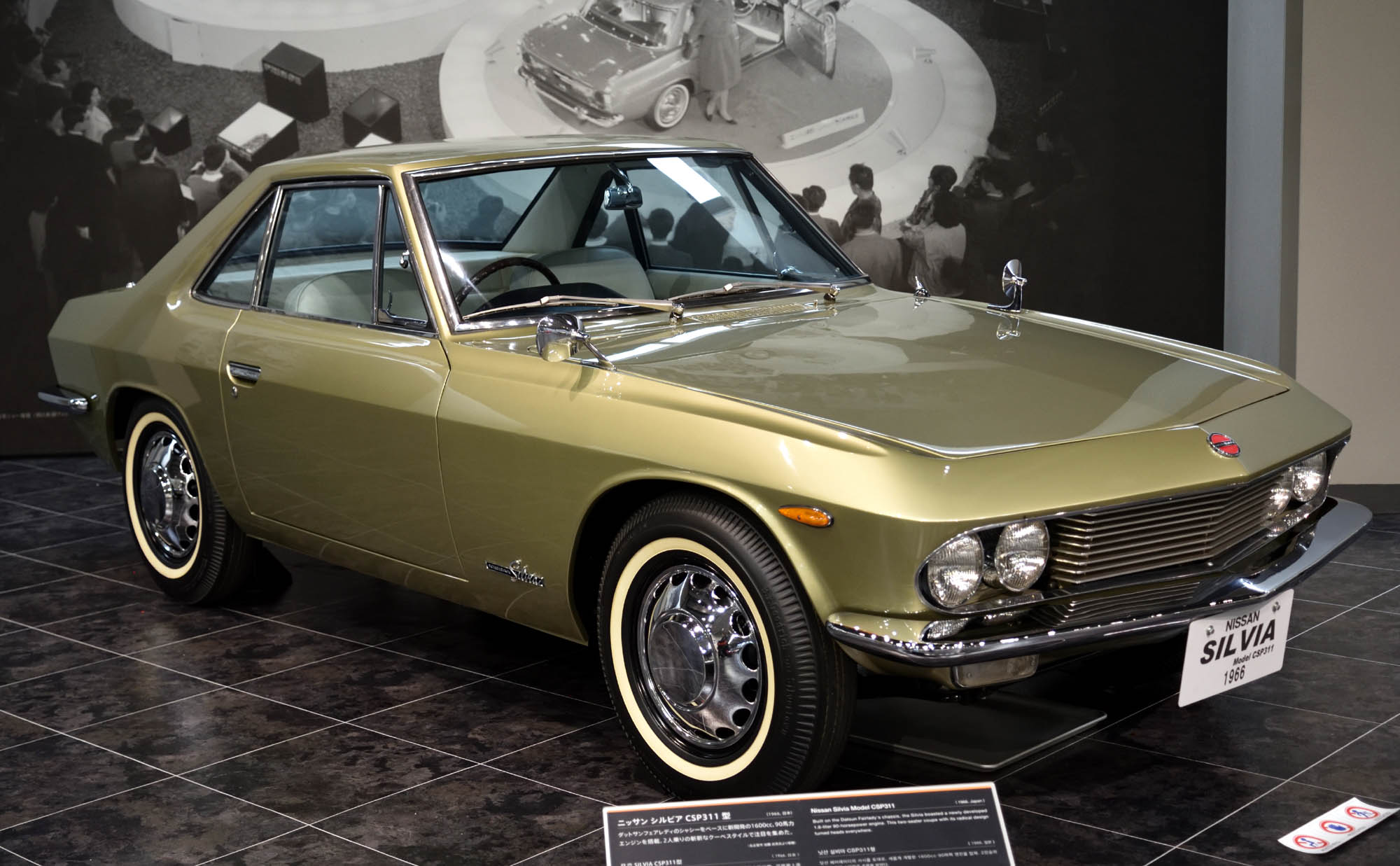
- Nissan Silvia (CSP311)

Overview
- Also called: Datsun 1600 Coupé
- Production: September 1965–1968; 554 produced
- Assembly: Japan: Hiratsuka, Kanagawa (Nissan Shatai Plant)
- Designer: Kazuo Kimura, Fumio Yoshida; Albrecht von Goertz (consultant)

Body and chassis
- Body style: 2-door coupé
- Platform: Datsun CSP311 platform
- Related: Datsun Fairlady SP311

Powertrain
- Engine: 1.6 L R I4 OHV
- Transmission: 4-speed manual

Dimensions
- Wheelbase: 2,280 mm (89.8 in)
- Length: 3,985 mm (156.9 in)
- Width: 1,508 mm (59.4 in)
- Height: 1,275 mm (50.2 in)
- Curb weight: 978 kg (2,156 lb)

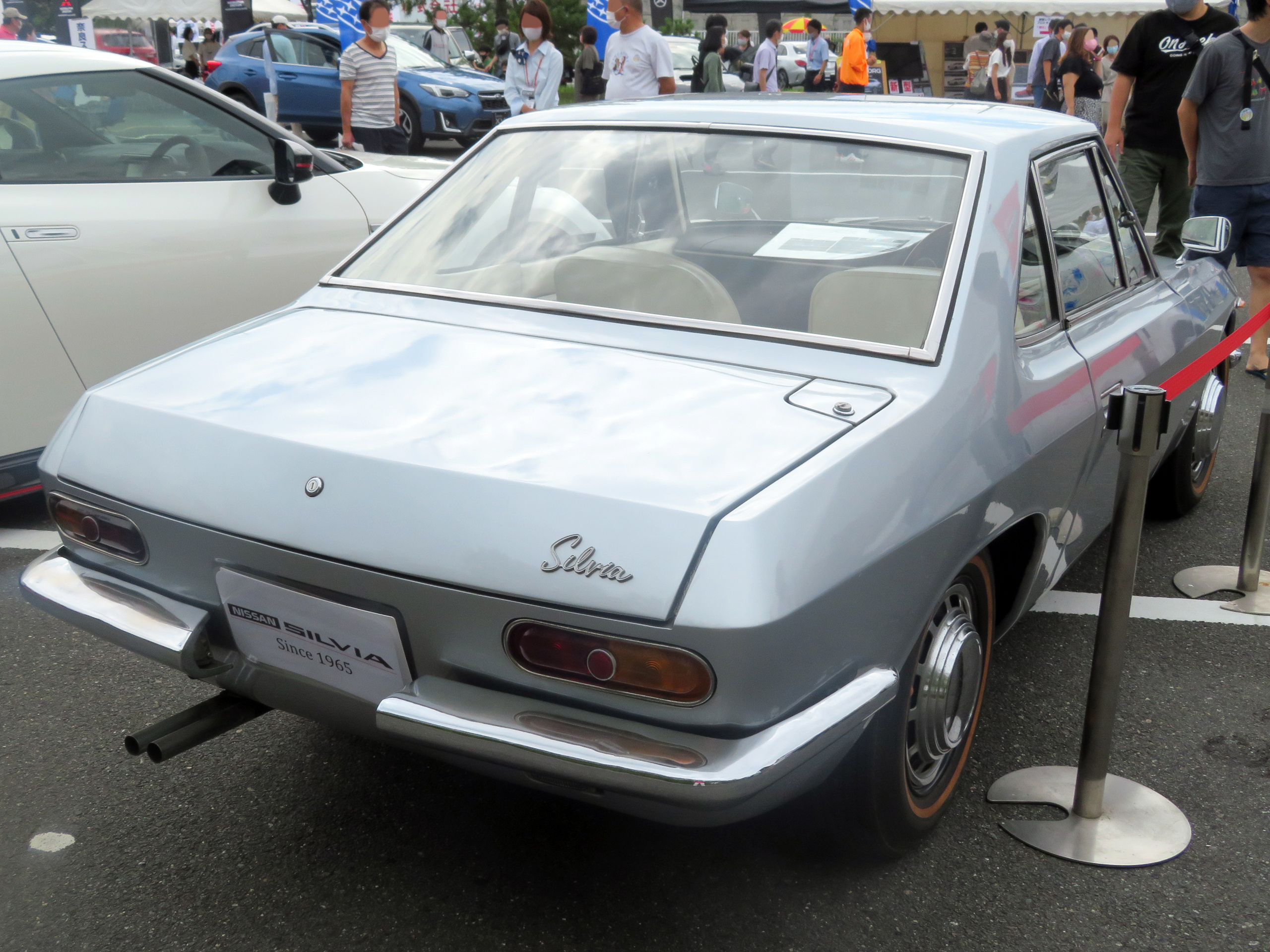
Rear view

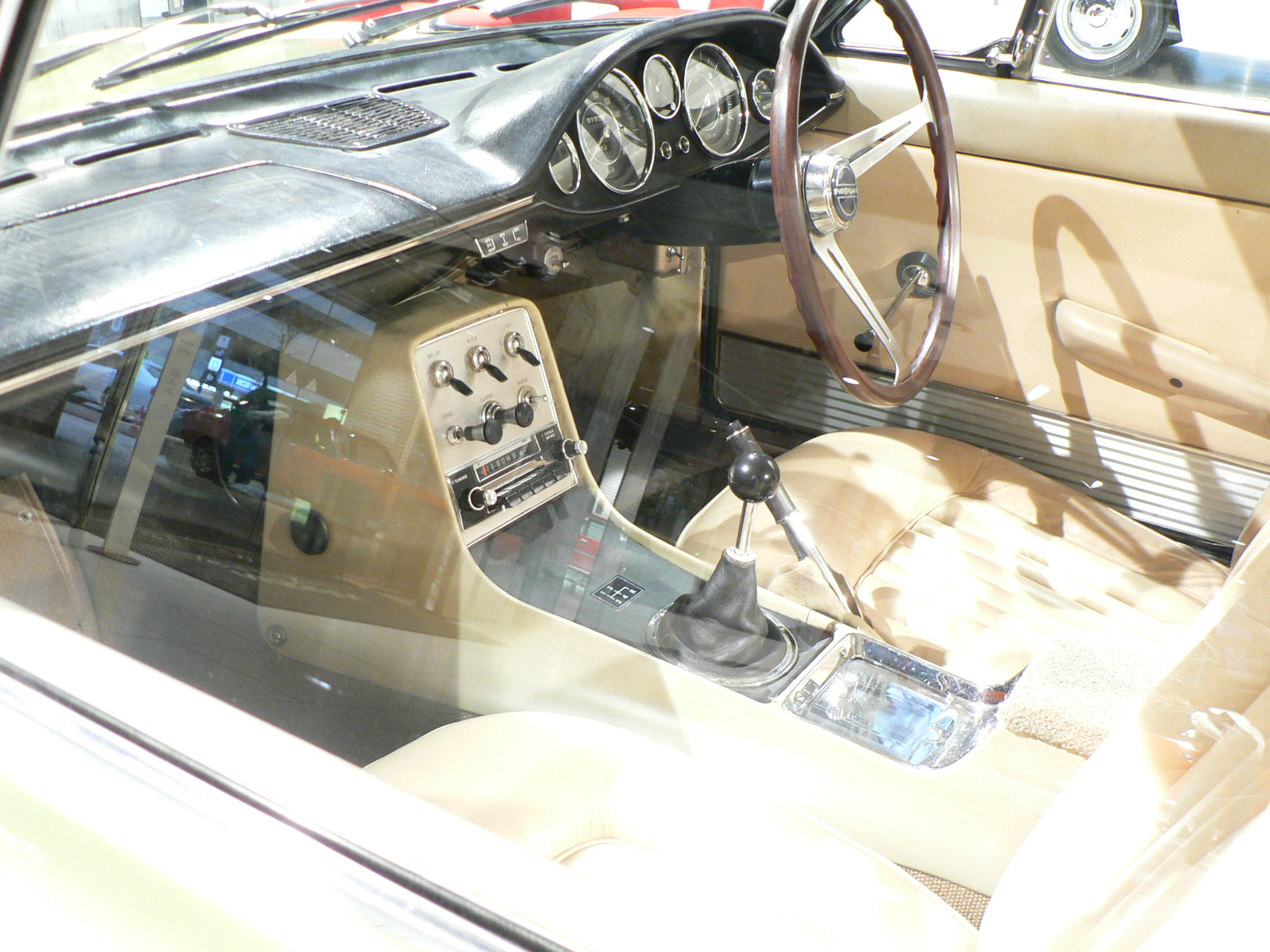
Interior

In 1962, Albrecht Goertz was working as a consultant for BMW, having created the BMW 507, and saw the potential of Japanese manufacturers. Yamaha had created the Technical Research Institute to develop their own sports car in 1959, and had built the YX30 sports car. As Yamaha had a working relationship with Nissan, work began on project A550X, but at some point the project fell apart and work was cancelled. Kazuo Kimura and Fumio Yoshida were both working on Project A550X and when the professional relationship between Nissan and Goertz ended in 1964, the work on the project contributed to the Silvia.

The Nissan Silvia CSP311 made its public debut at the Tokyo Motor Show in September 1964 as the "Datsun Coupé 1500". The introductory model was a hand-built coupé based on the Fairlady platform. The CSP311 was powered by the 96 PS (71 kW) 1.6 L Nissan R series engine. The engine was equipped with twin SU carburetors. Due to being nearly entirely hand made, only 554 were produced, mainly in 1965, before production stopped in 1968. Most of the vehicles remained in Japan; however, 49 examples were exported to Australia and another 10 went to other countries. 4 were also developed with a LHD interior for export to Europe, where they were displayed at events and shows.

In December 1965, Nissan provided the Tokyo Metropolitan Police Department with 2 CSP311 Silvias for highway patrol use. These were modified in various ways, but the engine remained standard. The CSP311 patrol car was the first Japanese high-performance patrol car, chosen due to being the fastest production car in Japan at the time with a top speed of 165 km/h (103 mph), and due to its disc brakes giving it good stopping power.

== S10 ==
Nissan Silvia (S10/S11)
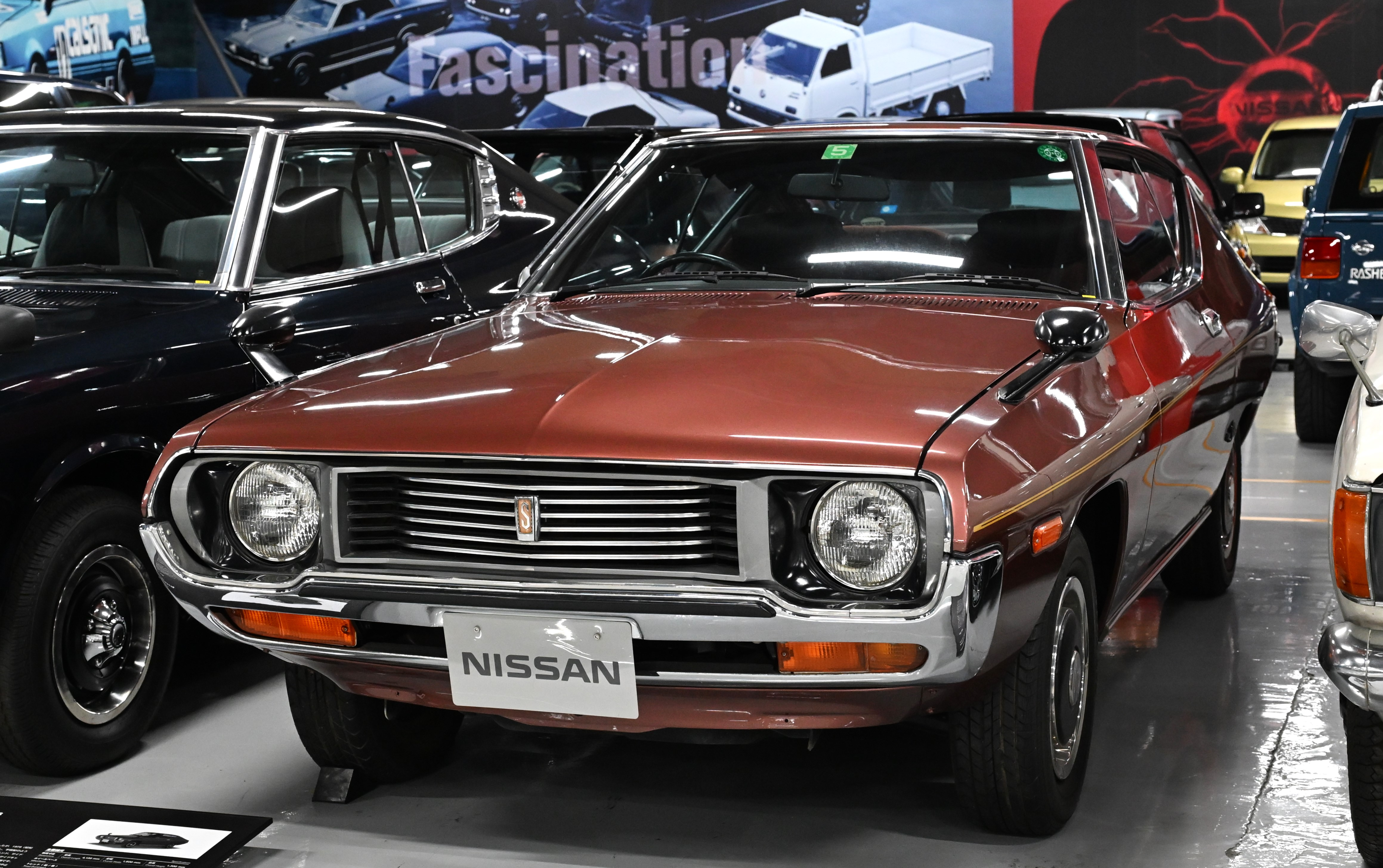
- 1975–1977 Nissan New Silvia LS Type S (S10)

Overview
- Also called: Nissan New Silvia; Datsun 180SX; Datsun 200SX (US)
- Production: 1975–1979
- Assembly: Japan: Zama, Kanagawa (Zama Plant)

Body and chassis
- Body style: 2-door fastback coupé
- Platform: Nissan S platform
- Related: Nissan Sunny

Powertrain
- Engine: 1.8 L L18S/E I4; 2.0 L L20B I4 (US)
- Transmission: 3-speed 3N71 automatic; 5-speed manual

Dimensions
- Wheelbase: 2,340 mm (92.1 in)
- Length: 4,135 mm (162.8 in) (Japan); 4,323 mm (170.2 in) (US)
- Width: 1,600 mm (63.0 in)
- Height: 1,300 mm (51.2 in)
- Curb weight: 990–1,000 kg (2,180–2,200 lb) (Japan); 1,073 kg (2,366 lb) (US)

The S10 was the first mass-produced Silvia built on the all-new S platform, intended as Nissan's compact, rear-wheel-drive, sporty car platform. Japanese versions were exclusive to Nissan Japanese dealerships called Nissan Prince Store along with the larger C110 Skyline. The S10 featured less "traditional" lines than similar offerings from rivals (such as Toyota Celica and Mazda Capella coupé), sharing a common appearance with the larger Skyline. Initially, the S10 was intended to be powered by a wankel engine, however this idea was scrapped due to the oil crises of the 1970s. The S10 was based on the Datsun Sunny Coupe.

In the small number of export markets (except for the United States) where it was available, this generation was sold as the Datsun 180SX. In the US it was the 200SX, reflecting the larger engine used there. During the 4-year lifespan of the S10/S11, over 145,000 units were produced until production stopped in 1979.

=== Japan ===
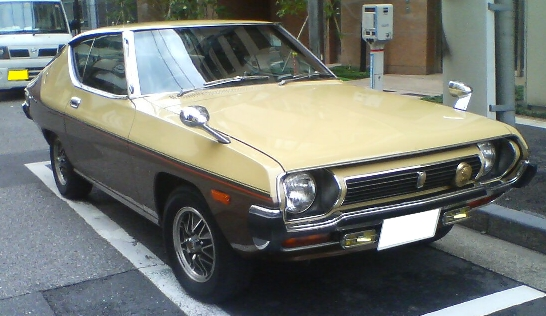

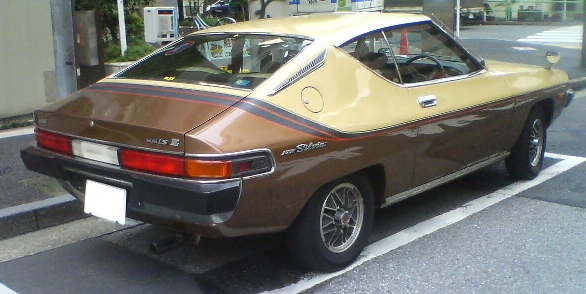
1977–1979 Nissan New Silvia (S11)

In Japan, the S10, officially named "New Silvia" was initially fitted with a 1.8 L L18S straight-four engine, which it shared with the Datsun 610/Bluebird 180B. Maximum power is 105 PS (77 kW) at 6,000 rpm, sufficient for top speeds from 165 to 175 km/h (103 to 109 mph) depending on which of the three transmissions were fitted: four-speed or five-speed manual, or a three-speed automatic. The Japanese version featured Nissan NAPS emission control technology at its introduction. In 1976, the S10 received its first upgrade; the new version met new, tighter emissions restrictions and brought with it a change of the model name from S10 to S11. The 1976 update also included the new Type LSE top trim level which got a new L18E engine with electronic fuel injection instead of the carburetor. In 1977, the S11 received upgrades including interior upgrades, a body-colored front grille, new wheels, new hubcaps, new rubber bumper corners, a new trim level "Type-G" and more optional parts and colors.

=== North America ===
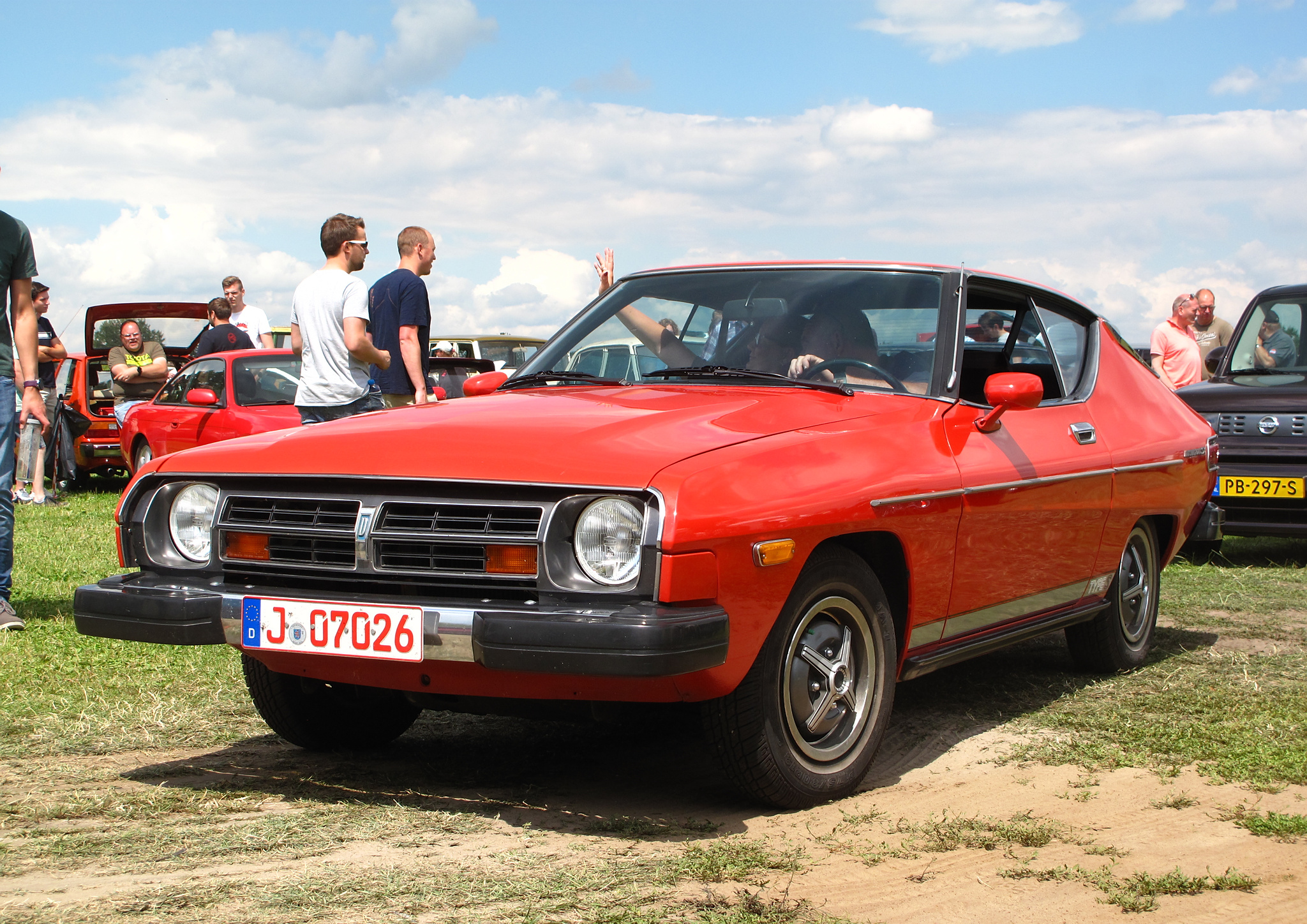
North American market Datsun 200SX with German license plate in the Netherlands

The S10 was exported in 1976 to the North American market as the Datsun 200SX, incorporating the larger-displacement 2.0 L L20B. This model in North America was affixed with the mandated 5 mph (8.0 km/h) bumpers, a new fascia and a LHD interior. The Datsun-200SX was initially sold with an MSRP of US$4,399, equivalent to US$23,000 today, making it a relatively cheap car for the time. There are official photos of a trim level called the Datsun 200SX/E which had window louvers, stripes, and a bodykit, however it appears to have never been produced.

Its success in both markets was limited, most buyers opting for the Celica over what was considered the more mundane S-Chassis. The car had a drivetrain similar to the popular 510, but with leaf springs fitted at the rear, rather than the 510's independent suspension.

Even though the standard car had poor handling, Paul Newman built and raced a 1977 Datsun 200SX in the 1978 IMSA Class C where it won 19 out of 22 races.

== S110 ==
Nissan Silvia (S110)
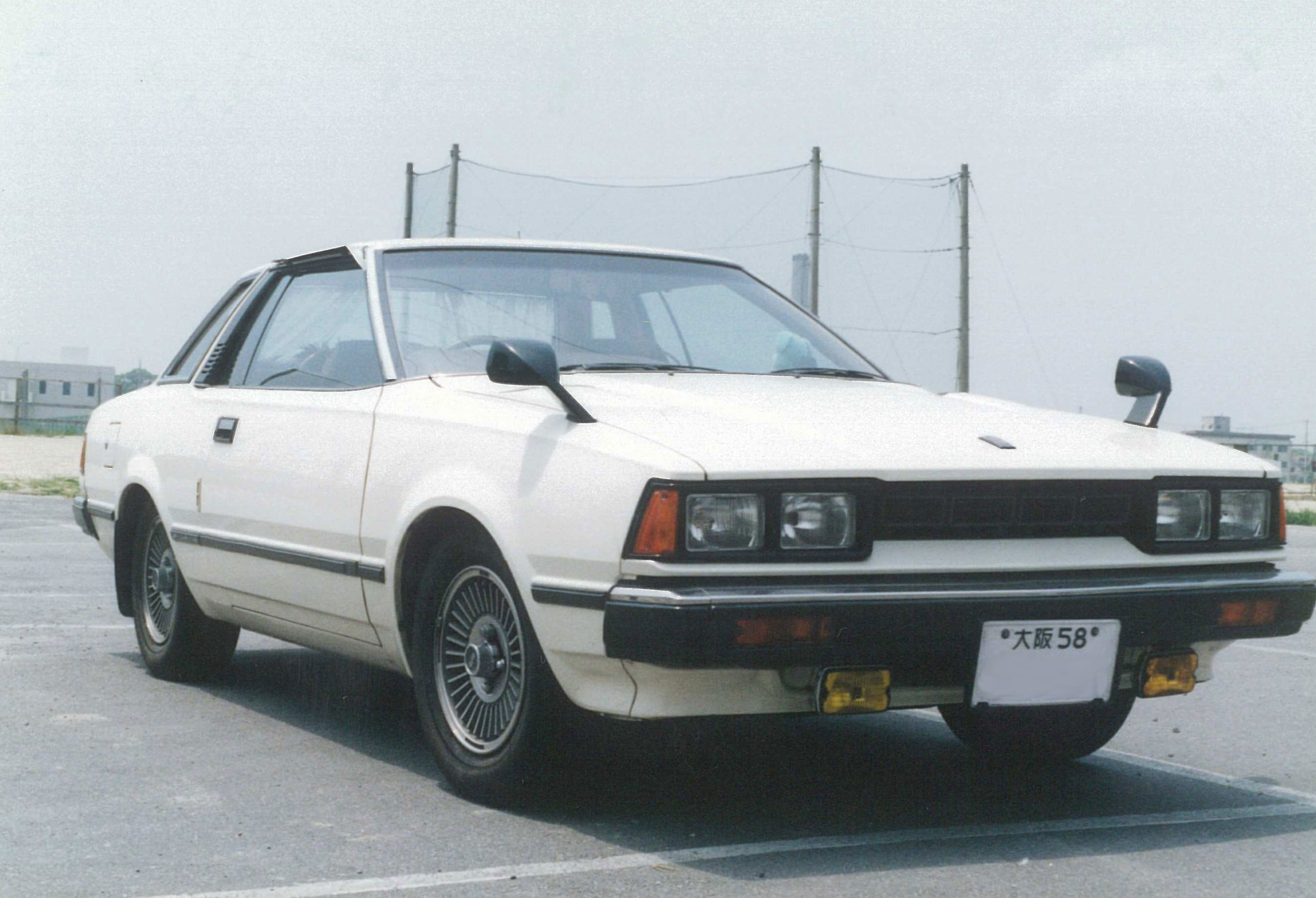
- Nissan Silvia 2000 ZSE-X Coupé (Japan)

Overview
- Also called: Nissan Gazelle; Nissan 240RS (rally car); Datsun 200SX (United States & Canada); Datsun 180SX; Datsun Silvia; Datsun Sakura (Mexico)
- Production: March 1979 – August 1983
- Assembly: Japan: Kanda, Fukuoka (Nissan Shatai Plant)

Body and chassis
- Body style: 2-door coupé; 3-door hatchback
- Platform: Nissan S platform
- Related: Nissan Sunny (B310); Nissan Violet (A10)

Powertrain
- Engine: 1770 cc L18 I4; 1770 cc Z18/S/E I4; 1770 cc Z18ET turbo I4; 1952 cc L20B I4; 1952 cc Z20/Z20E I4; 1990 cc FJ20E DOHC I4; 2188 cc Z22E I4; 2340 cc FJ24 DOHC I4 (240RS)
- Transmission: 3-speed automatic; 5-speed manual

Dimensions
- Wheelbase: 2,400 mm (94.5 in)
- Length: 4,400 mm (173.2 in)
- Width: 1,680 mm (66.1 in)
- Height: 1,310 mm (51.6 in)
- Curb weight: 1,105 kg (2,436 lb)

This iteration of the Silvia (sold in United States and Canada as the Datsun 200SX and in Mexico as the Datsun Sakura, Japanese for cherry blossom), available as a 2-door hardtop coupe and a new bodystyle 3-door hatchback. The Japanese market version of the hatchback was called the Gazelle and was exclusive to Nissan Store locations sold alongside the Fairlady Z, while the coupe body style Silvia remained exclusive to Nissan Prince Store locations alongside the Skyline. Its sharp-edged styling was shared with the new Nissan Leopard sedan and coupé, also exclusive to Nissan Store.

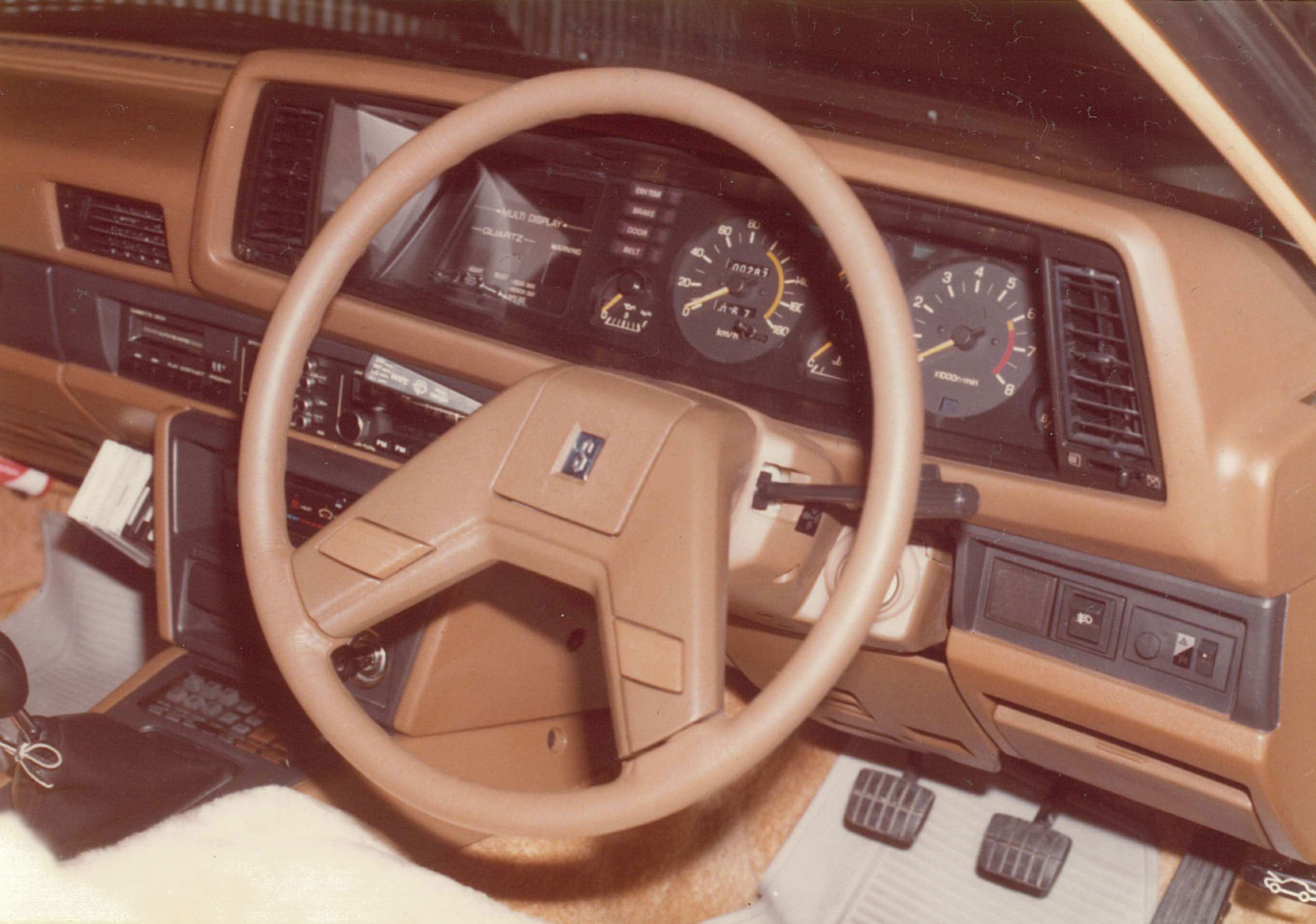
Interior of a Silvia 2000 ZSE-X

Like the previous generation, the S110 Silvia was uniquely progressive in that it was originally intended to feature a rotary engine, designed and built by Nissan. The resulting unit was fairly unreliable, and forestalled production. Coincidentally, this Silvia shares its chassis code with the Mazda Cosmo, the first Japanese production car to feature a rotary engine. The chassis was shared with the B310 Nissan Sunny and the larger A10 Nissan Violet platform.

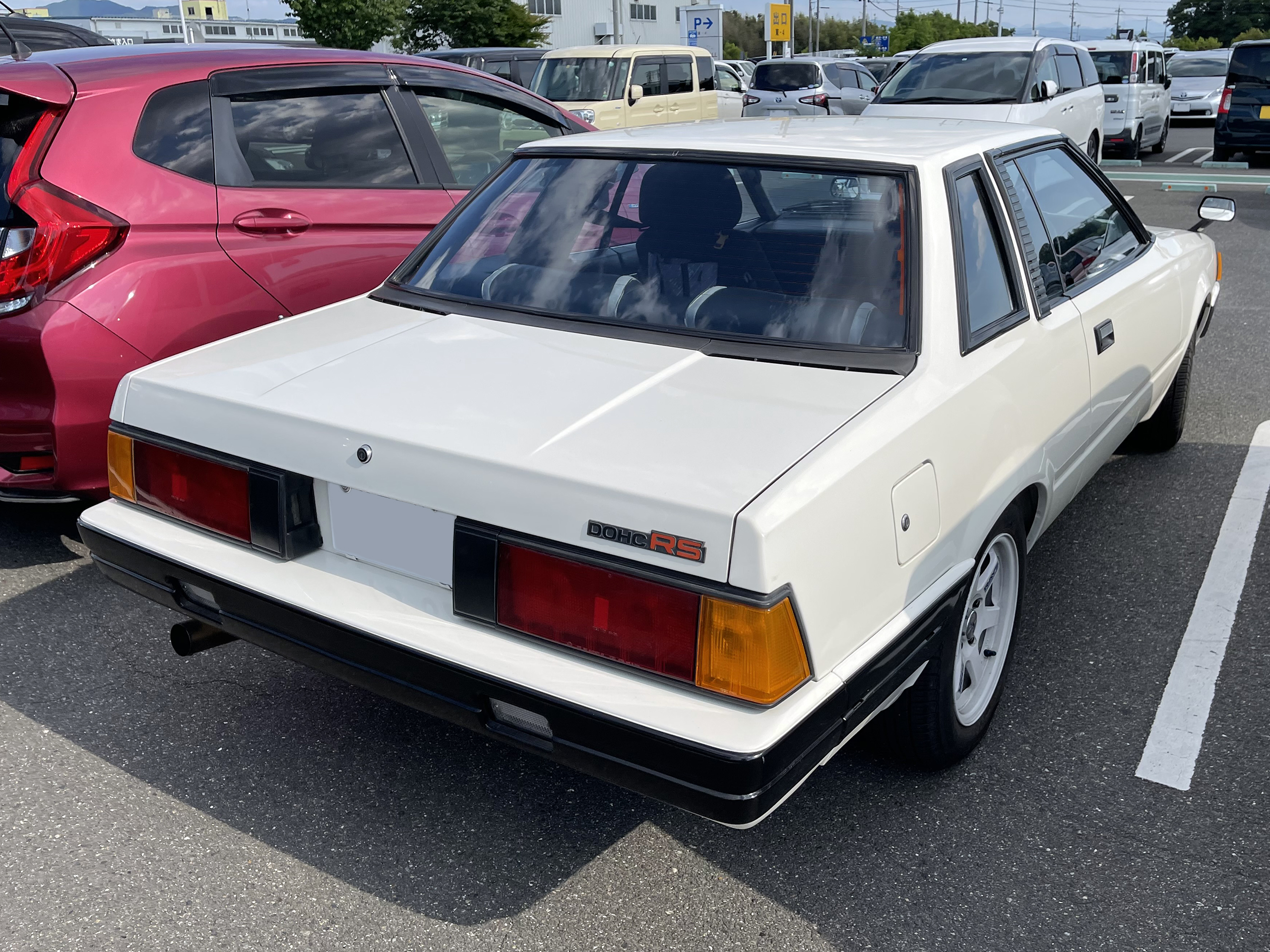
Facelift Nissan Silvia 2000 RS (US110) in Japan

The car was redesigned shortly before it was released and the stillborn Wankel power plant was replaced by a line of twin-plug conventional piston engines from the new Z-series range. These included the Z20 and the turbocharged and later the fuel-injected Z18ET, although the latter of the two was only available to the Japanese domestic market and after the mid-life facelift. This took place in late May 1981 and included new bumpers and a reworked front design. Albeit a sporting design, the 135 PS (99 kW) Turbo model received largely the same chassis as regular models and did not have any kind of turbocharger boost indicator. At the time of the facelift, the DOHC FJ20-engined RS model was also introduced.

=== Gazelle ===
Nissan rebadged the Silvia as the Gazelle coupé and hatchback so that Nissan's different dealership networks in Japan could all carry their own variants of the model. There are minor cosmetic differences between the two cars such as grille pattern and taillight lenses. Gazelle was treated as a more exclusive model, while the Silvia was the base and sporty models.

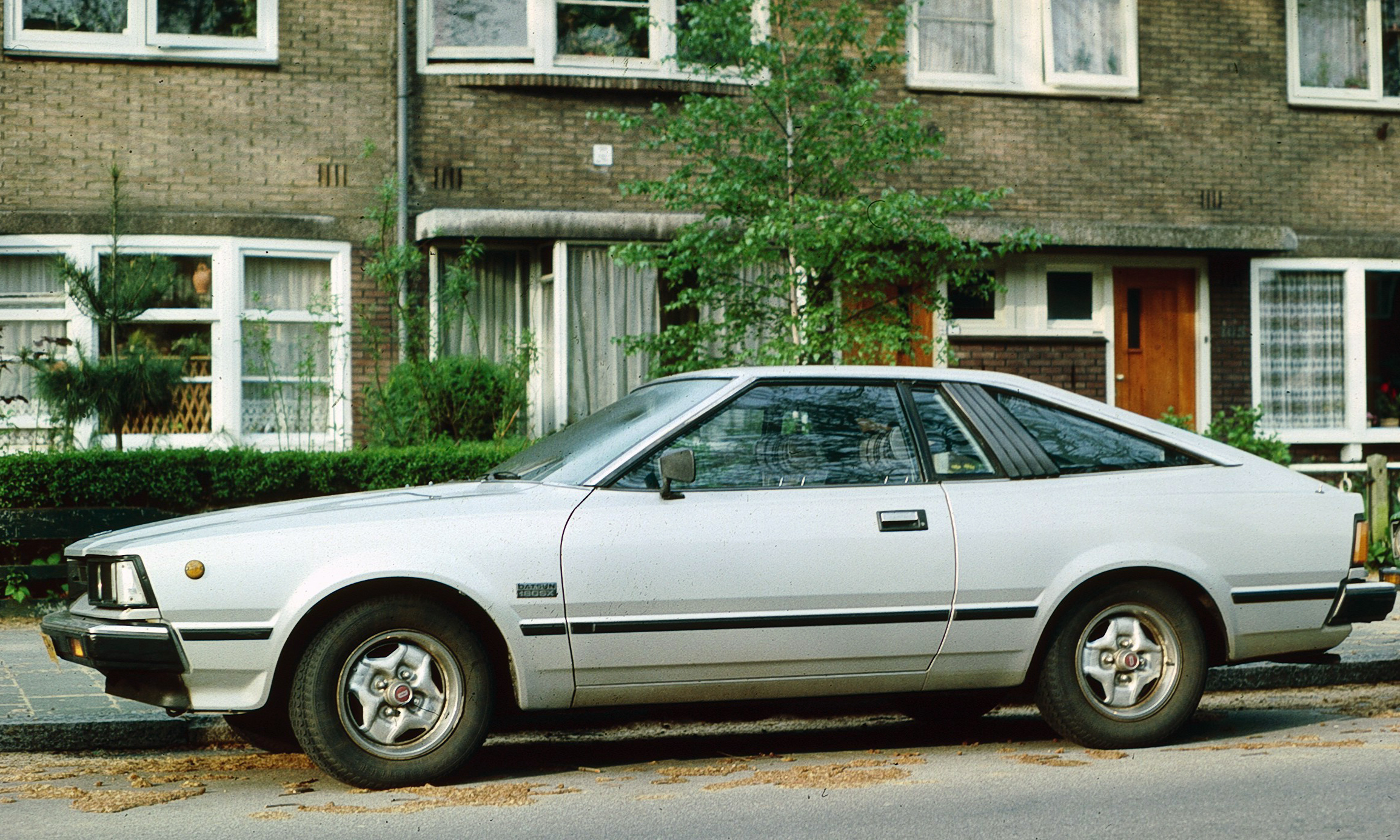
1979–1981 Nissan Gazelle, also known as the 180SX Silvia in export markets

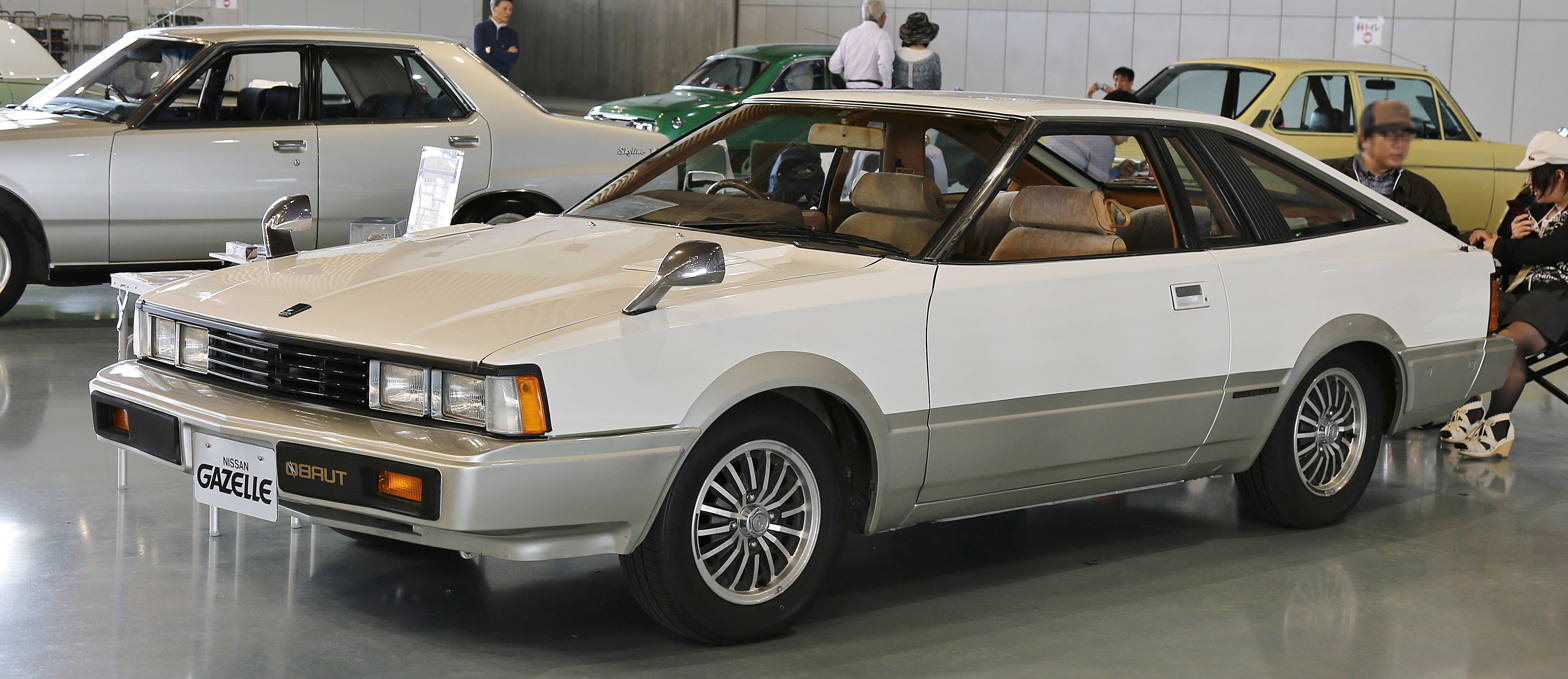
The facelift model Nissan Gazelle XE-II Turbo in Japan

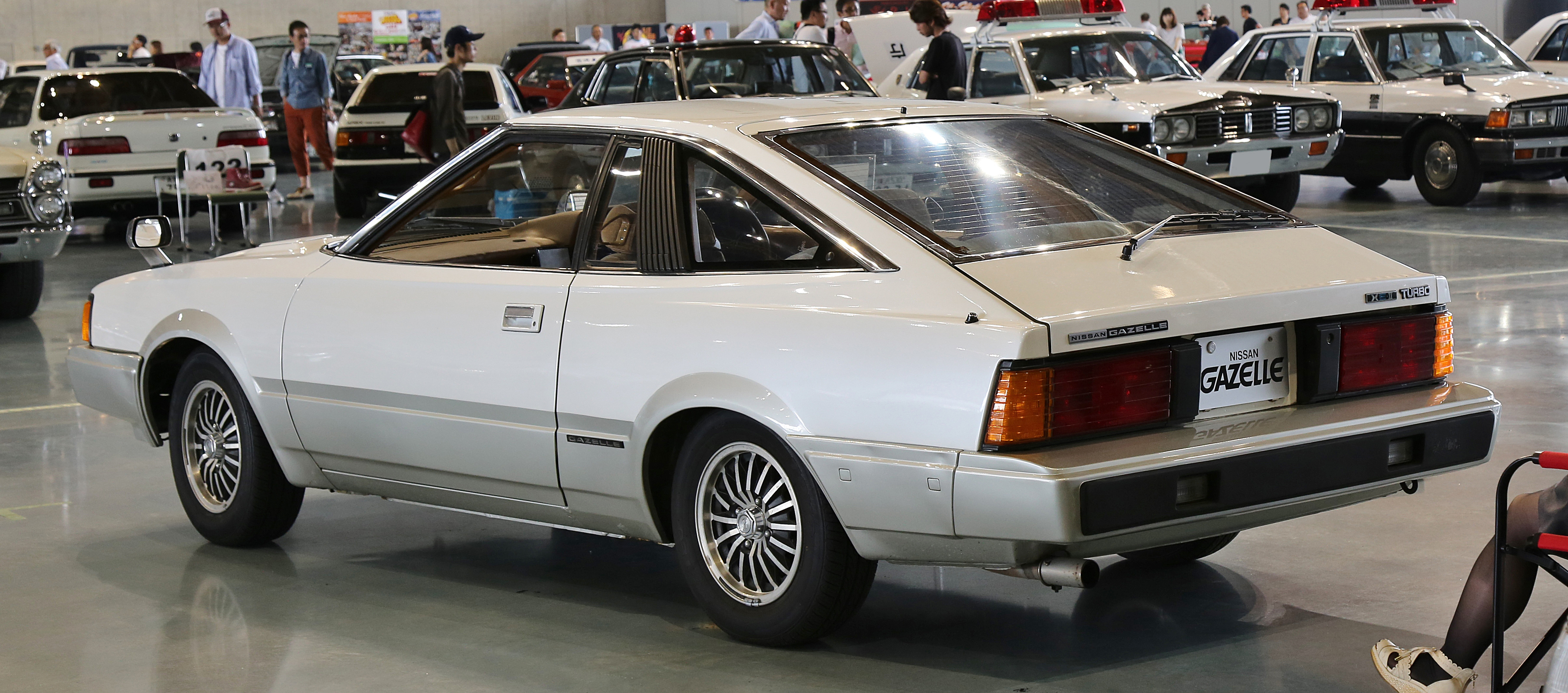
1981–1983 Nissan Gazelle Turbo hatchback (S110) in Japan

=== North America ===
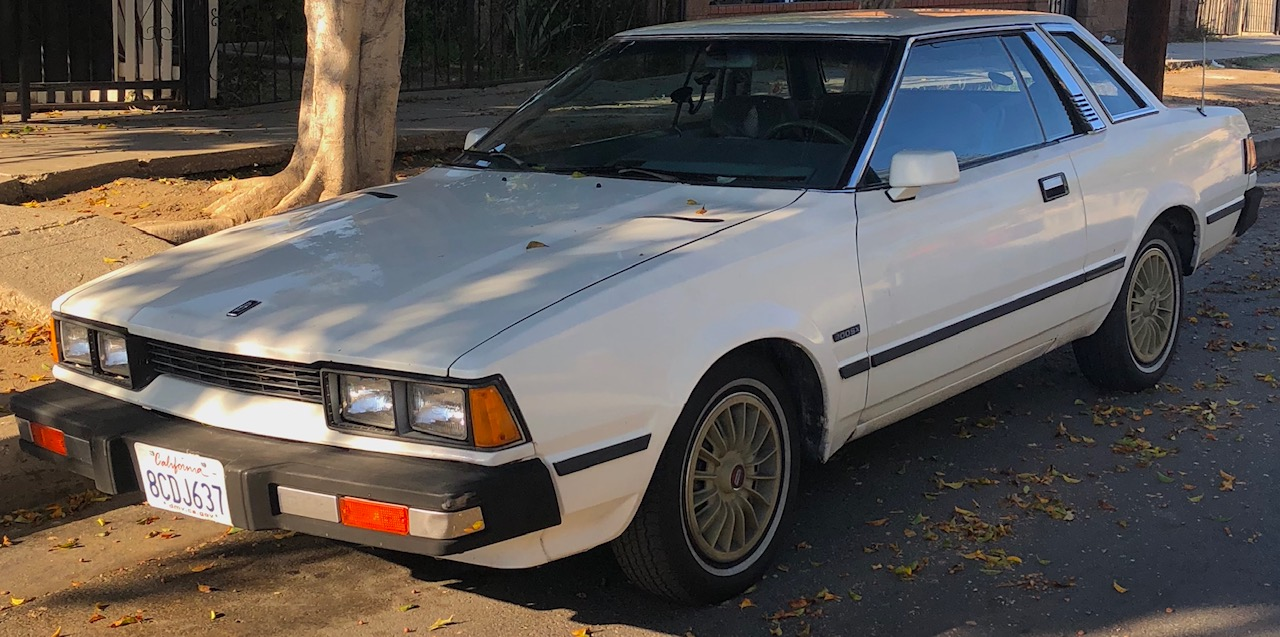
1981 Datsun 200SX Coupé (S110) in the US

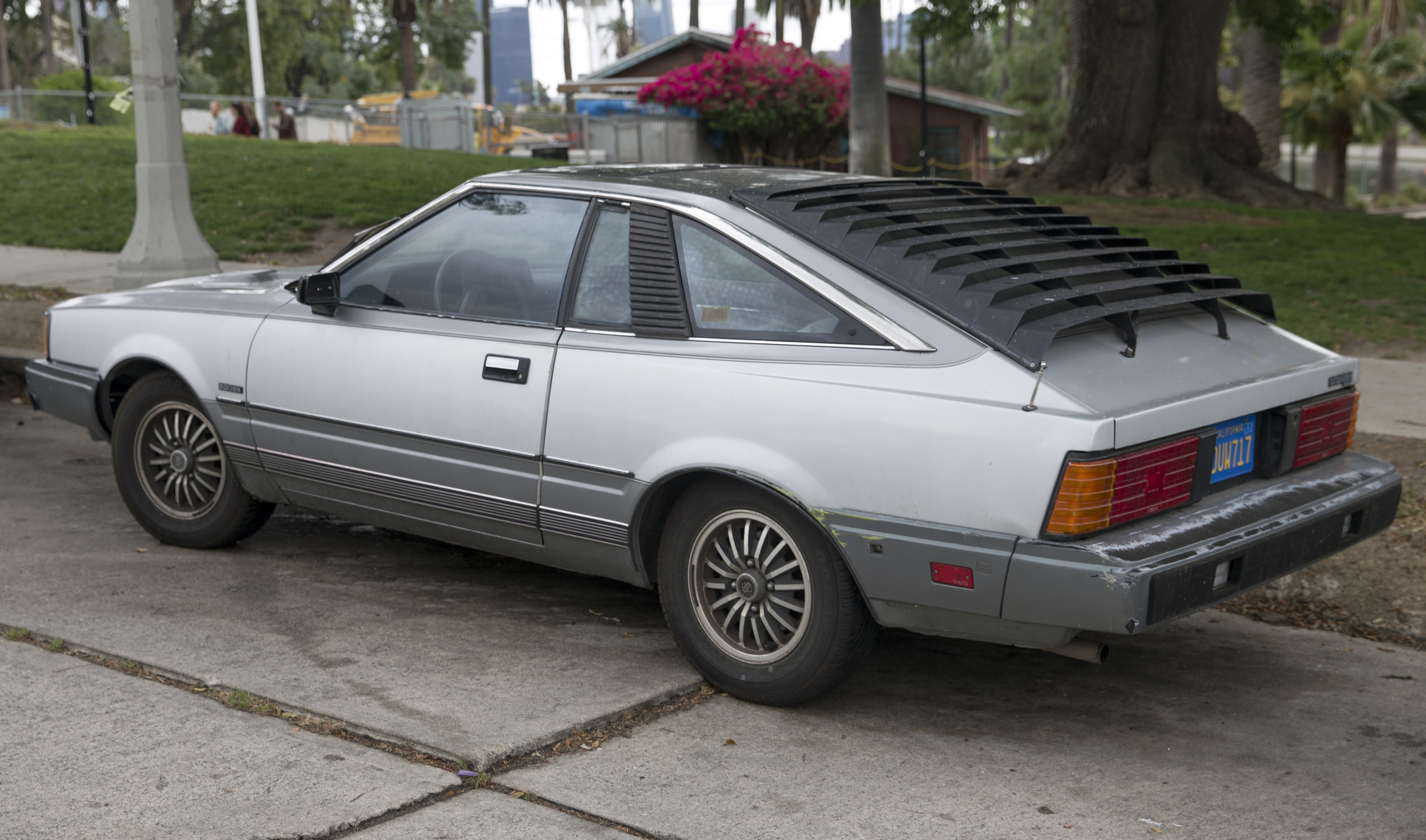
1982 Datsun 200SX SL Hatchback (S110) in the US

The Silvia continued to be sold as the 200SX in North America, with either the two-door coupé or the three-door liftback bodywork. It was originally powered by the 2.0 L inline-four L20B engine, although in 1980 California-market cars received the twin-plug Z20 NAPS-Z inline-four of the same displacement. From the 1981 model year, this became the only engine available to the 200SX. Power is 100 hp (75 kW; 101 PS), channeled through a five-speed manual or a three-speed automatic and coupled with the H165 rear axle. For 1982 the 200SX was facelifted and gained the 2.2-liter Z22E engine coupled with the sturdier H190 rear axle. This model produces 103 hp (77 kW) SAE at 5200 rpm. There were no significant changes for 1983 and these were sold well into the 1984 model year, as the S12 did not appear until February 1984.

The top model was the luxurious SL, which received a remote opening hood, trunk, and gas tank lid, more adjustable seats, and a removable glass skyroof. The hatchback model received sportier trim, while the notchback coupé focused more on luxury.

=== 240RS ===
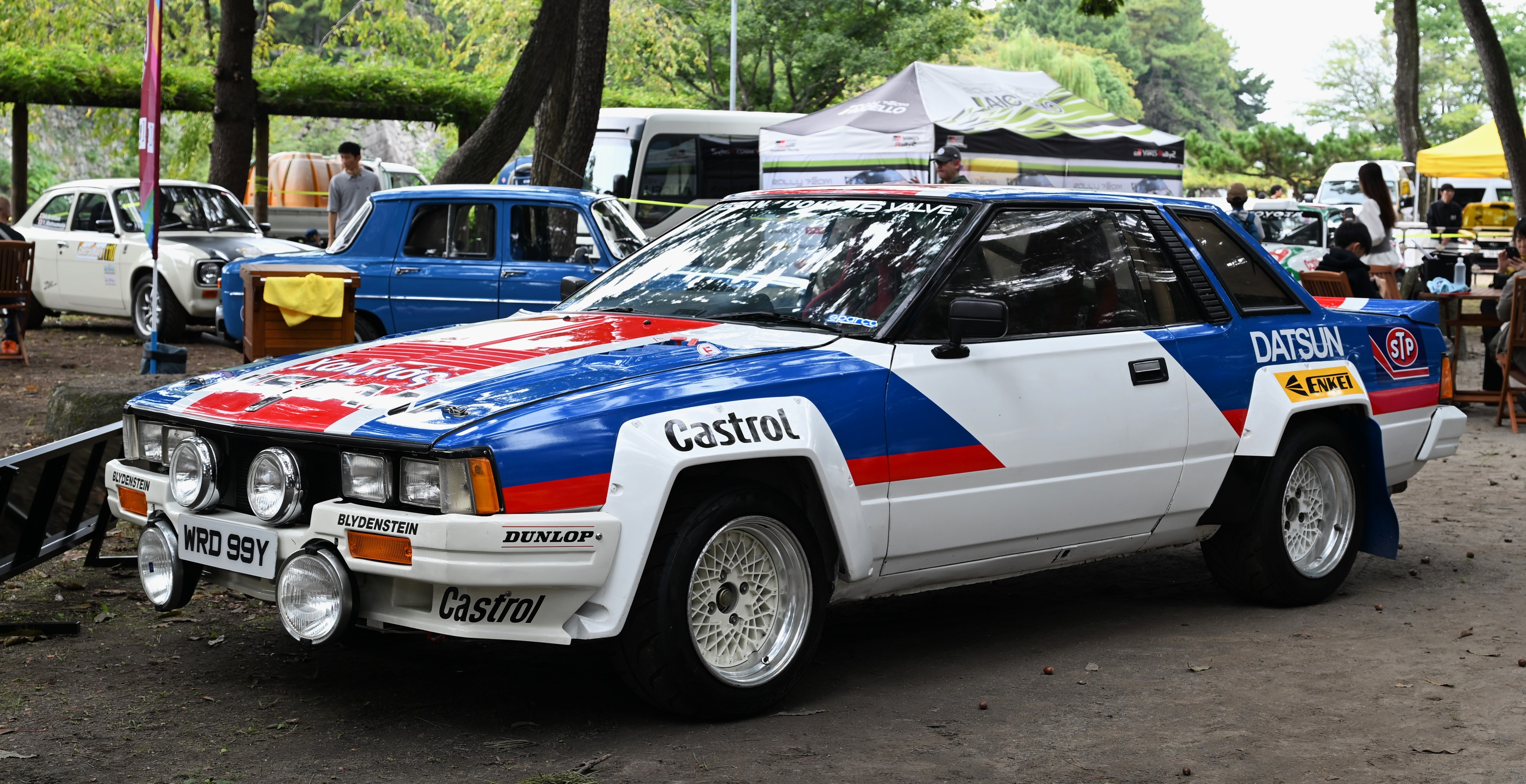

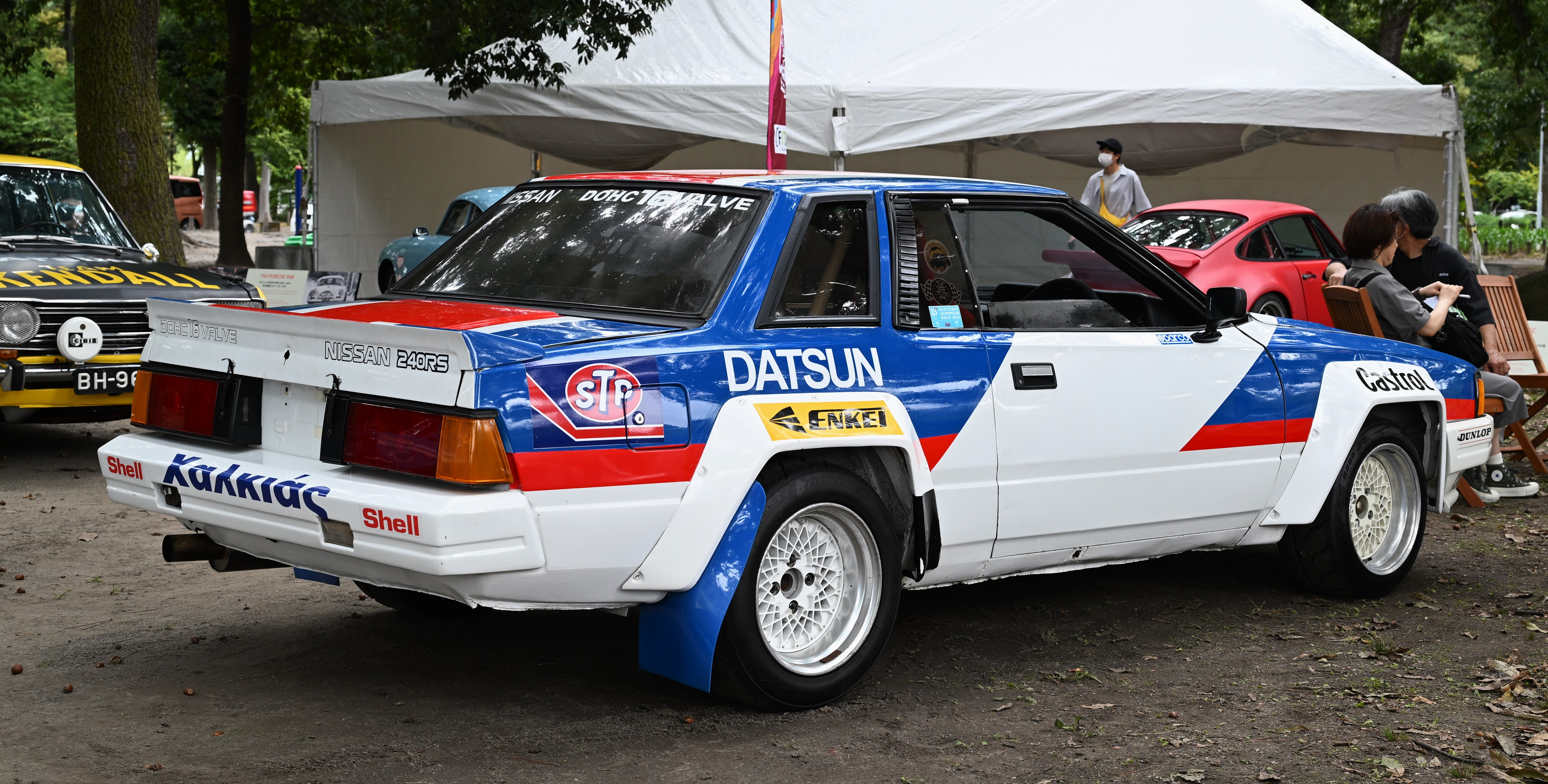
1983 Nissan 240RS Evolution

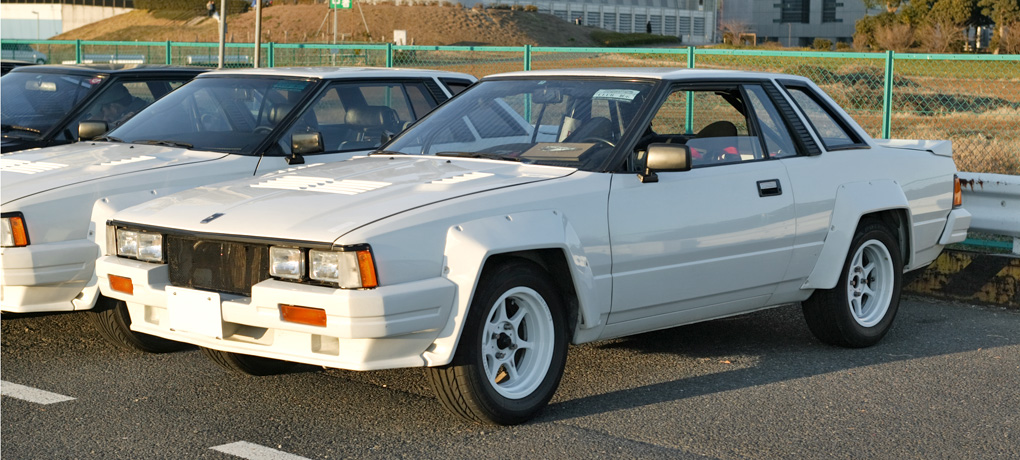
Road car version

This generation saw the introduction of the Nissan 240RS (BS110), a coupe fitted with the 2.4-liter DOHC FJ24 engine. About 200 road going examples were built between 1983 and 1985 for homologation purposes. Around 150 were left-hand drive and 50 were right-hand drive, with about 30 of these being used in the WRC and various national rally championships. its production extending the end of the S110 itself. The resulting machine became Nissan's official rally car in the World Rally Championship from 1983 to 1985, with its best result a second-place finish in the 1983 New Zealand Rally. Some 240RS units are sold privately in very limited quantities.

Nissan also briefly competed with the regular Silvia: in 1982 Nissan confusingly homologated it as a bodystyle variant of the Violet (A10) under the name Datsun Violet GTS. This model used the same twin cam LZ20B engine as was installed in late competition variants of the Violet; the model had already been raced as a Silvia at the 1981 Safari Rally. The Violet GTS' first outing was at the 1982 Rallye de Portugal, where team leader Timo Salonen failed to finish after the suspension broke. Best result for the Silvia-based Violet GTS was in the 1982 Rally New Zealand when Salonen finished 4th.

== S12 ==
Nissan Silvia (S12)
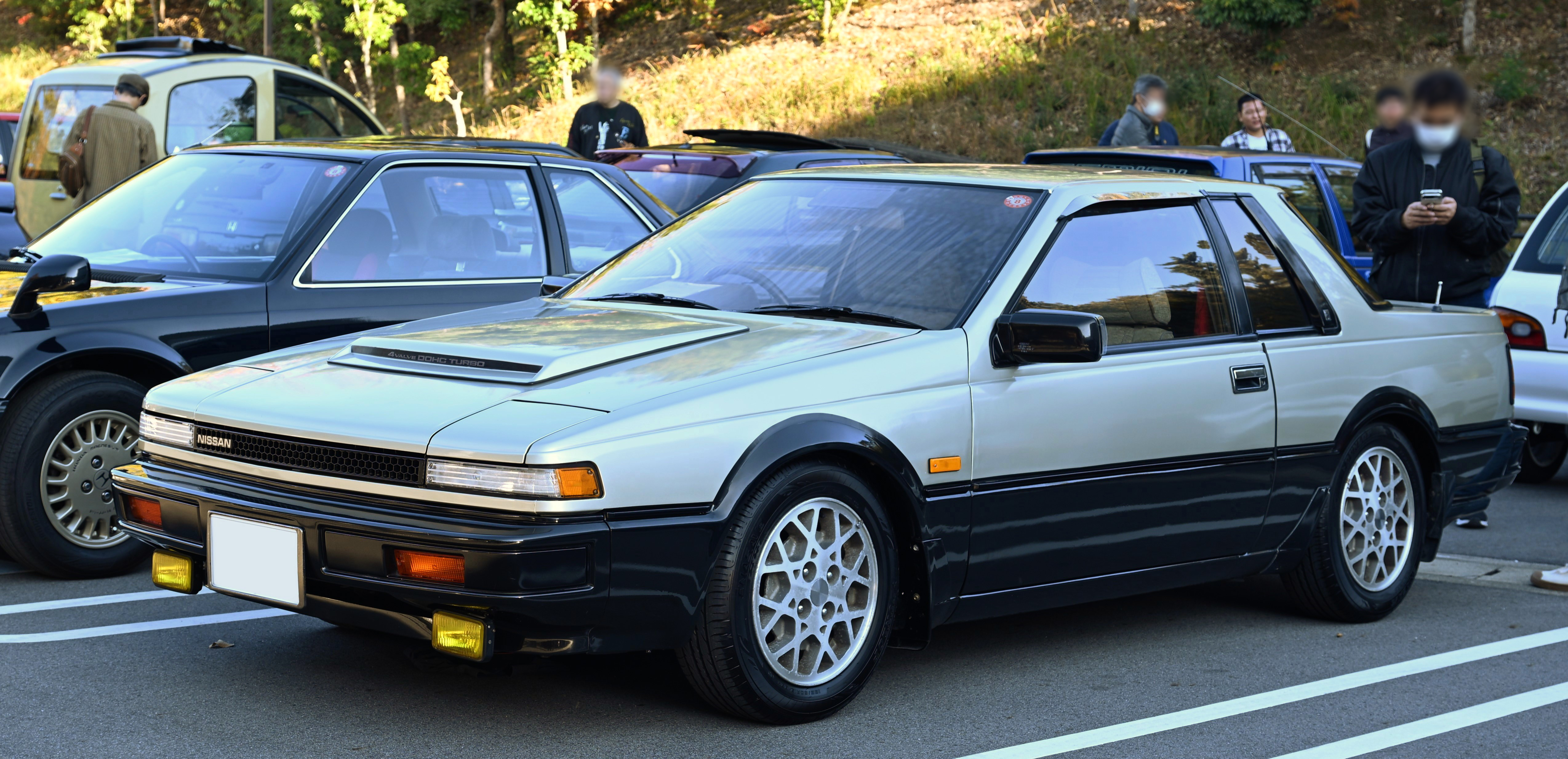
- Nissan Silvia RS-X Turbo (S12; pre-facelift) in Japan

Overview
- Also called: Nissan 180ZX (Sweden); Nissan 200SX (North America); Nissan Gazelle (Japan, Australia)
- Production: August 1983 – May 1988
- Assembly: Japan: Kanda, Fukuoka (Nissan Shatai Plant)
- Designer: Nobuyuki Ashizawa

Body and chassis
- Body style: 2-door coupé; 3-door hatchback
- Layout: FR layout
- Platform: Nissan S platform

Powertrain
- Engine: 1.8 L CA18S/E/DE I4; 1.8 L CA18ET/CA18DET turbo I4; 2.0 L CA20E I4; 2.0 L FJ20E I4 (GP); 2.0 L FJ20ET turbo I4 (RS-X); 3.0 L VG30E V6
- Transmission: 5-speed manual; 4-speed L4N71/E4N71 automatic

Dimensions
- Wheelbase: 2,425 mm (95.5 in)
- Length: 1984–1986: 4,430 mm (174.4 in); 1987–1988: 4,460 mm (175.6 in)
- Width: 1984–1986: 1,660 mm (65.4 in); 1987–1988: 1,669 mm (65.7 in)
- Height: 1984–1986: 1,330 mm (52.4 in); 1987–1988: 1,280 mm (50.4 in)
- Curb weight: 1,170 kg (2,580 lb)

The S12 was produced from August 1983 to 1989, with revisions to the exterior trim in 1986 (referred to as "Mark II"). It used retractable pop-up headlights and was sold in two configurations — a coupé (often called a "notchback" due to the side profile view of its rear window section) and a hatchback. The hatchback version bore some heavy resemblance to the 3-door liftback versions of the Toyota Corolla Levin and Sprinter Trueno AE86.

A number of different engines were equipped in the S12 chassis, depending on geographic market and production year, with an additional change in available engines again with the mid-cycle facelift. The NAPS system was carried over on the CA20E which replaced the Z engines of the S110 in North America. A CA18ET 1.8l turbo engine with ECCS was added for SE trims, Certain US trims had the S12 equipped with an optional VG30E V6 engine, also shared by the 300ZX (Z31). The FJ20 was replaced with the CA18DET in the Mk2 revision in markets where it was offered.

On the original, pre-facelift model, the bumpers featured matte-finish raised surfaces, and sides featured half-inch rubstripping. Cars featured a honeycomb radiator grille, and long corner lights. The RS-X trim in Japan and Europe received a hood bulge accent to accommodate the oversized dimensions of the FJ20E/ET engine, and featured a faux front vent with monogram (either FJ20, DOHC, or TURBO); In North America, the 1984 Turbo came with a "TURBO" monogrammed hood bulge accent, although all subsequent North American Mark I hoods were flat regardless of trim. In some markets, the 1984 and 1985 could be had with a foam rubber deck spoiler. In 1986 the foam rubber deck spoiler was changed for a fiberglass version with an integrated third brake light. Some hatchbacks and all Turbo models came with ground effects, as did the RS-X coupés These had a combination of plastic mudflaps (monogrammed as either "NISSAN", or "SILVIA" in applicable markets) and accommodating foam rubber sideskirts, as well as a foam rubber lower deflection lip. 1984 year foam rubber sideskirts featured the "NISSAN" monogram.

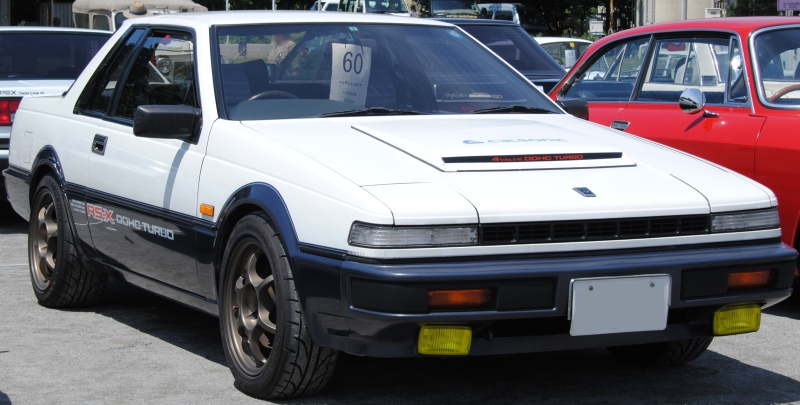
Nissan Silvia RS-X Turbo coupé (JDM; pre-facelift)

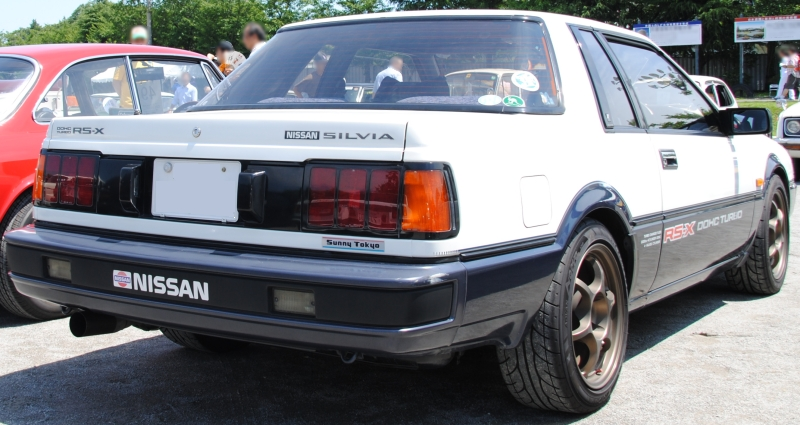
Nissan Silvia RS-X Turbo coupé (JDM; pre-facelift)

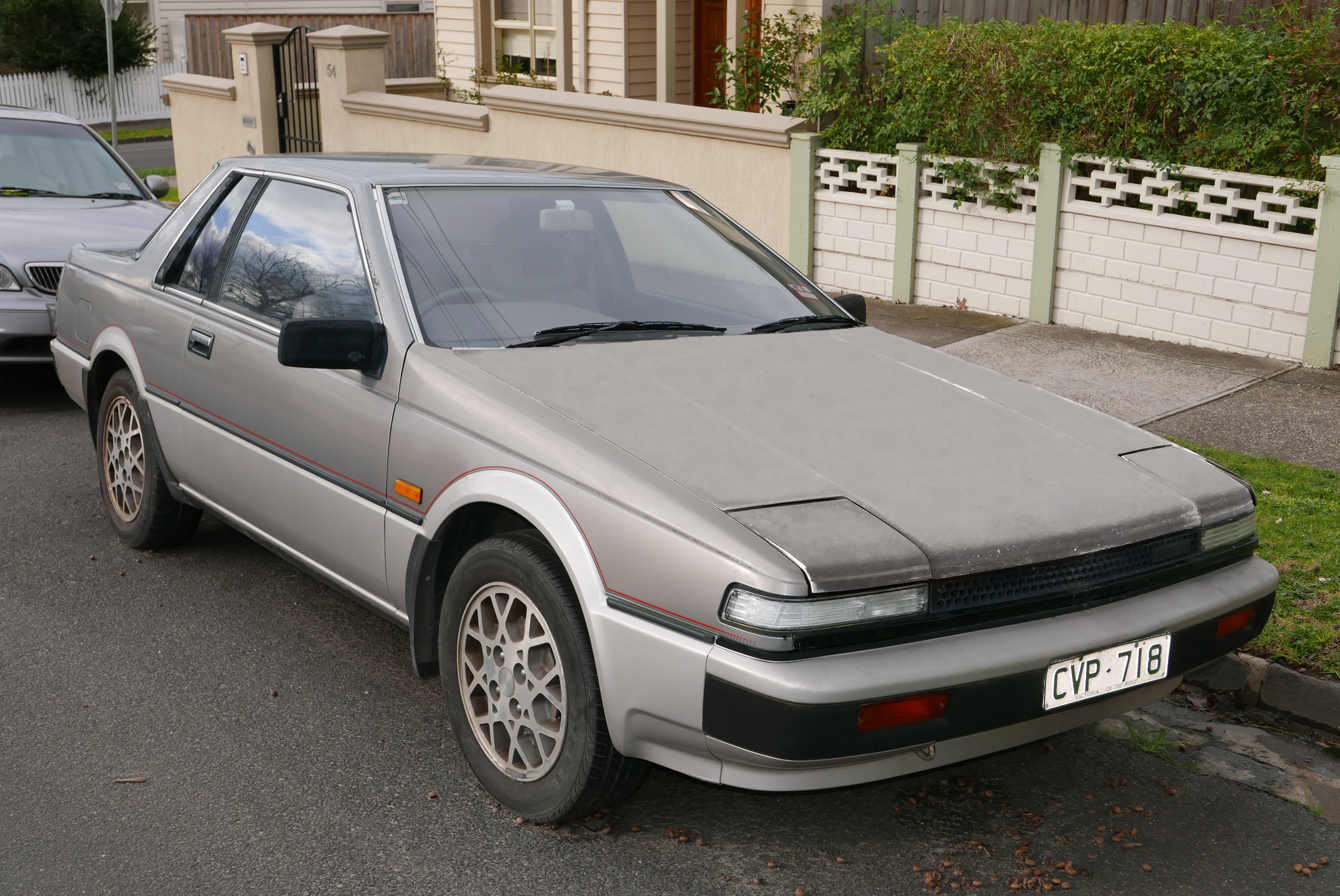
1986 Nissan Gazelle SGL coupè (Australia)

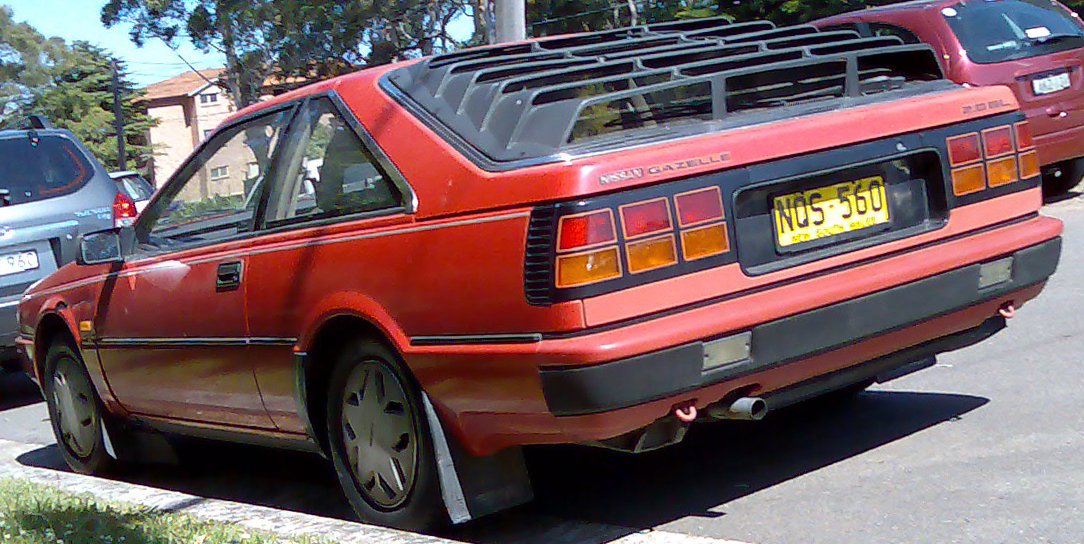
Pre-facelift Nissan Gazelle GL hatchback (Australia)

=== Facelift ===
In 1986, for the 1987 model year, the bumpers were updated, and the matte finished surfaces were eliminated for a more uniform surface. Rubstripping was increased to 2-inch height with scribe detailing. The honeycomb radiator grille was replaced with a slatted version that spanned the entire front end (previous was shorter), and cornerlights were shortened. The "SE" model and the Turbo (Canada, Europe) came with new fiberglass ground effects and mudflaps, painted in the color of the car, and a new and more pronounced lower deflection lip in the front. All facelift S12's received a new reverse-cowl hood bulge design to provide clearance for the new 3.0-litre V6. Optional rear mudflap accents were available.

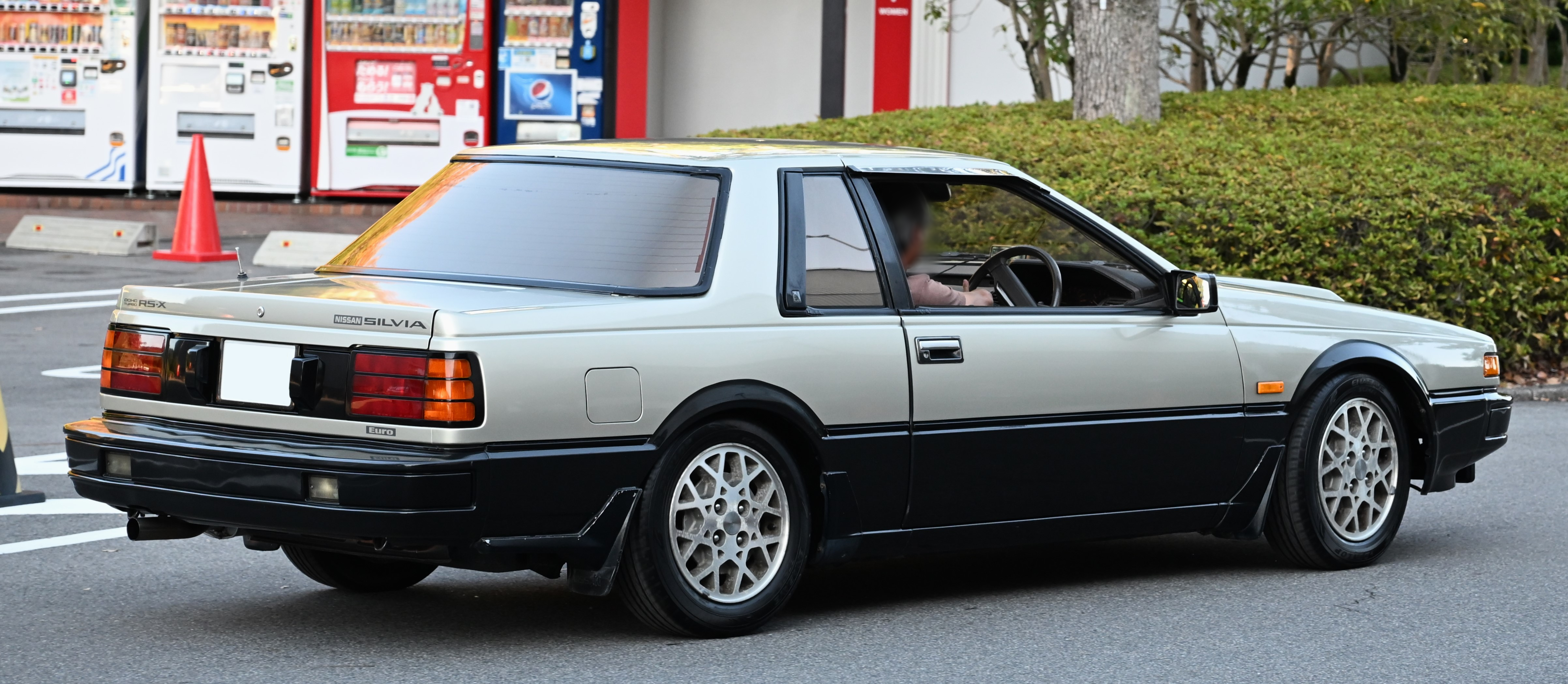
1985 Nissan Silvia Coupe (facelift)

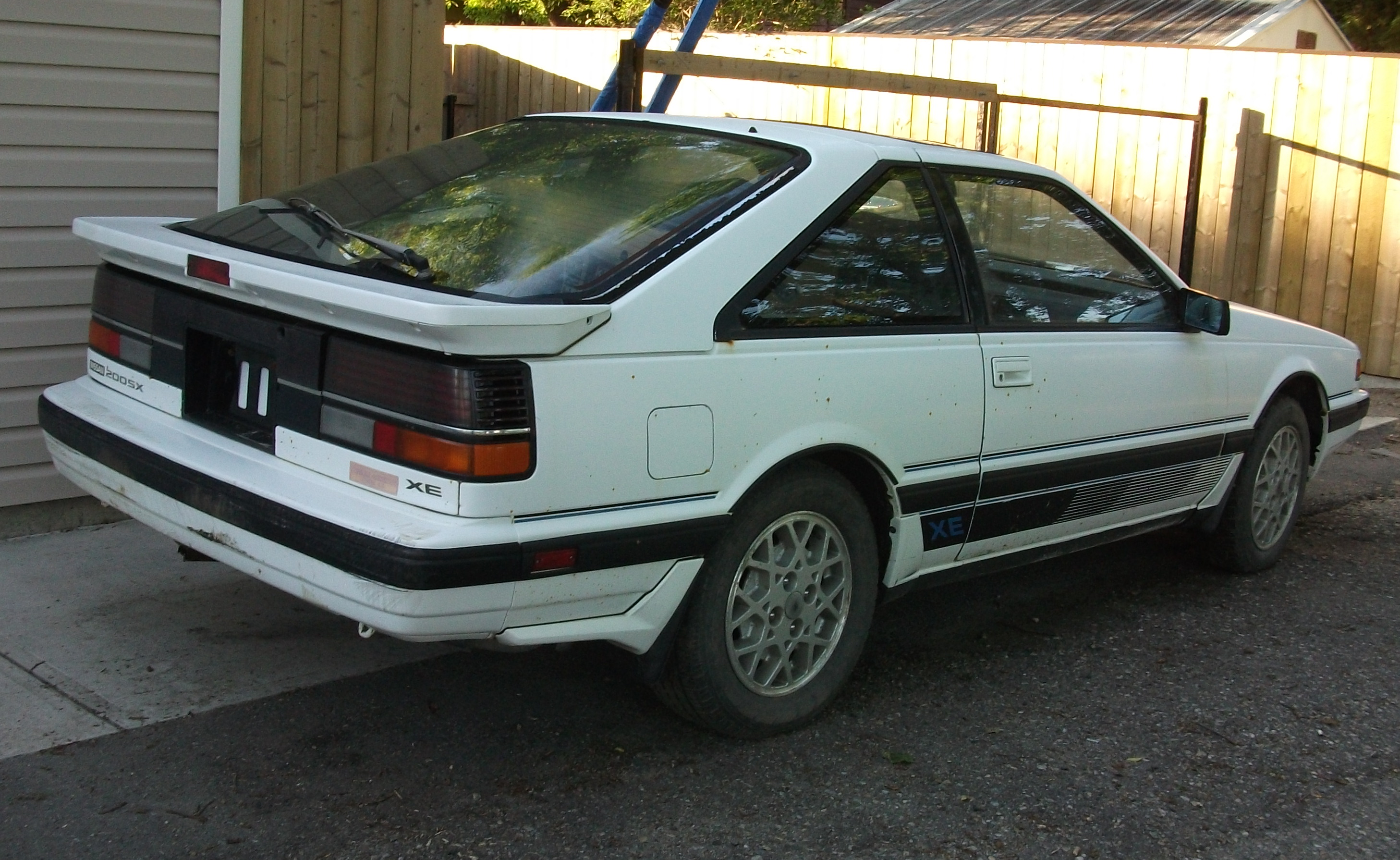
Nissan 200SX XE hatchback; new rear lamps

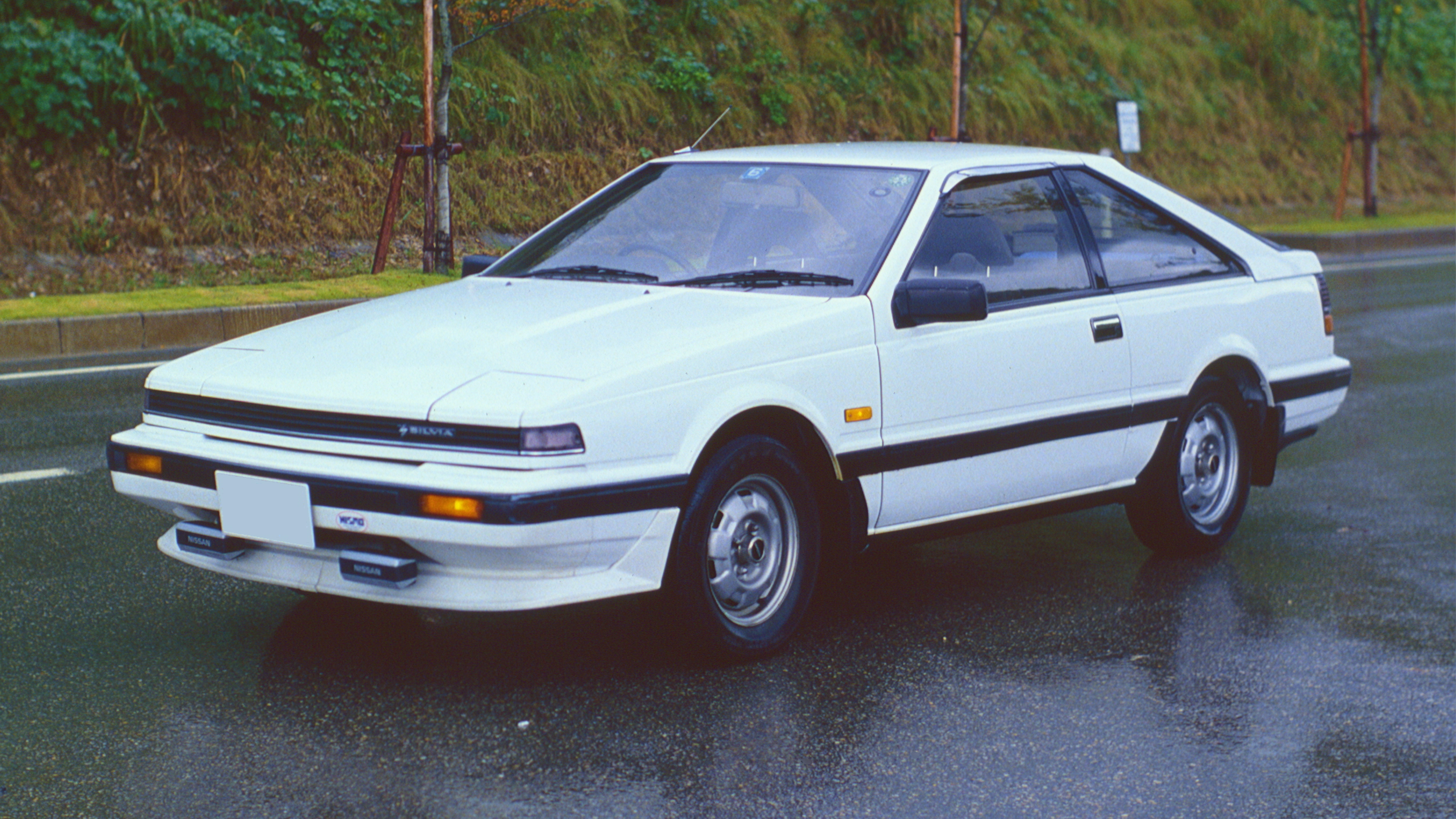
Nissan Silvia R-X Hatchback (JS12, Japan)

=== Markets ===
==== Japan ====
As with the S110, the S12 chassis in Japan was badged as both a Silvia and a Gazelle. The S12 Silvia in Japan was available in a hatchback as a basic model only, or as a coupé (notchback) in base, RS, and RS-X trims and exclusive to Nissan Prince Store Japanese dealerships as a junior companion to the Nissan Skyline. The S12 Gazelle was strictly a hatchback, available in regular, RS and RS-X variants and exclusive to Nissan Store locations as a junior companion to the Fairlady ZX. The RS was equipped with the 2.0-litre DOHC "FJ" engine (FJ20E), while the RS-X was equipped with a turbocharged version of the same engine (FJ20ET). In 1987 Nissan discontinued the FJ Series engine in the S12 and replaced it with the CA18DET (Also with dual cams but a bigger turbocharger — the CA18DET). Japanese spec Gazelle models came with many options like voice command, fog lights and a variety of different engine options (FJ20E, FJ20ET, CA18DE, CA18E, CA18DET.). The RS-X model also came with different factory alloy wheels. When the S13 Silvia was introduced in 1988 in Japan, sales of the Gazelle ended, and nameplate was replaced with the Nissan 180SX as a junior companion to the 300ZX. In Australia there would not be a replacement until the introduction of the Silvia-based Nissan 200SX in 1995.

==== North America ====
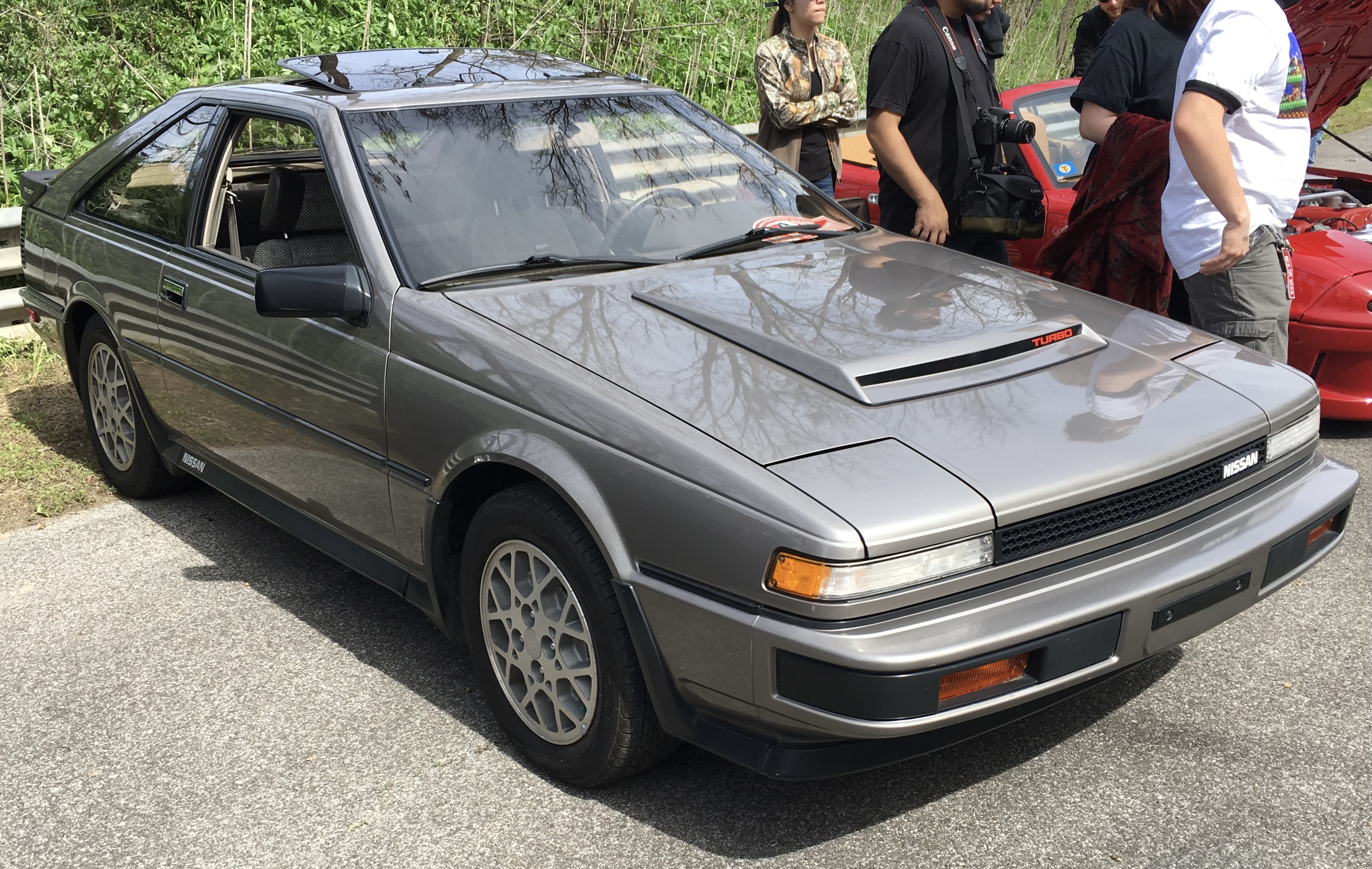
Nissan 200SX Turbo hatchback in the United States

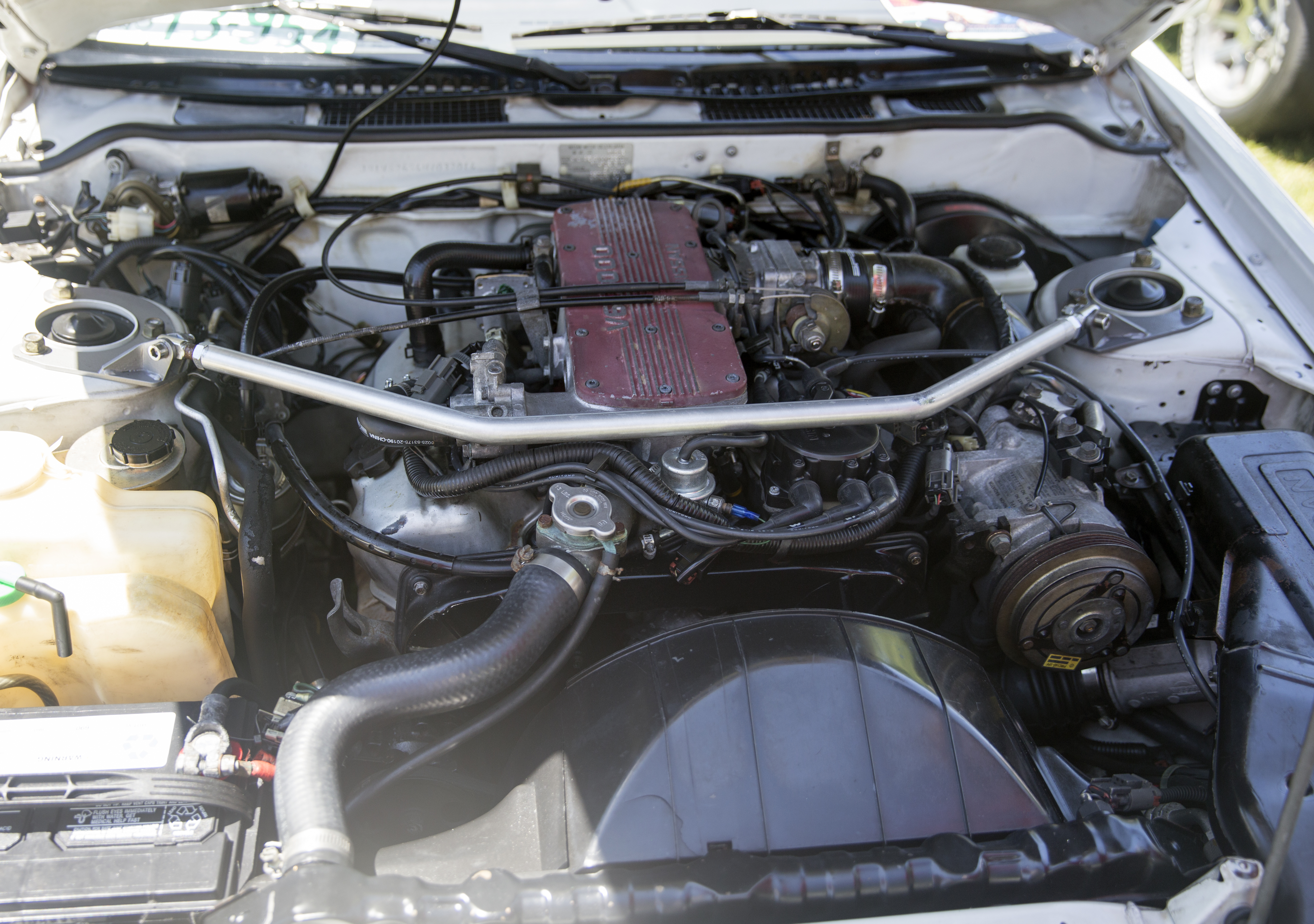
VG30E engine in a Nissan 200SX SE

The S12 series was badged as a "Nissan 200SX" in North America. It was introduced in February 1984, four months behind the rest of Nissan's 1984 models. For fear that the North American market would not be as profitable as other markets throughout, Nissan executives only scheduled the manufacturing of 5,000 of each trim package/engine options in the final two years before the halt of production for the United States, which was in 1988.

The S12 "XE" notchback coupé, was only available with a 2.0-litre SOHC, non-turbo engine and made available with either a 5-speed manual or 4-speed automatic gearbox. (CA20E) The hatchback received both the 2.0L SOHC engine, and a 1.8L SOHC Turbo (non-intercooled) engine (CA18ET). For 1987 in the United States, Nissan discontinued the Turbo model and created the "SE" model which had a 3.0L SOHC VG30E V6 engine, generating 160 hp (119 kW) and 174 lbf⋅ft (236 N⋅m) of torque. This was similar to the engine offered in the non-turbo Z31 300ZX for that generation. This model received the RVS12 model code. For 1988 the "SE" model received a 5 hp (3.7 kW) gain from using the later "W" series revisions of the VG30E with a total output of 165 hp (123 kW) while torque remained the same at 174 lbf⋅ft (236 N⋅m).

==== Europe ====
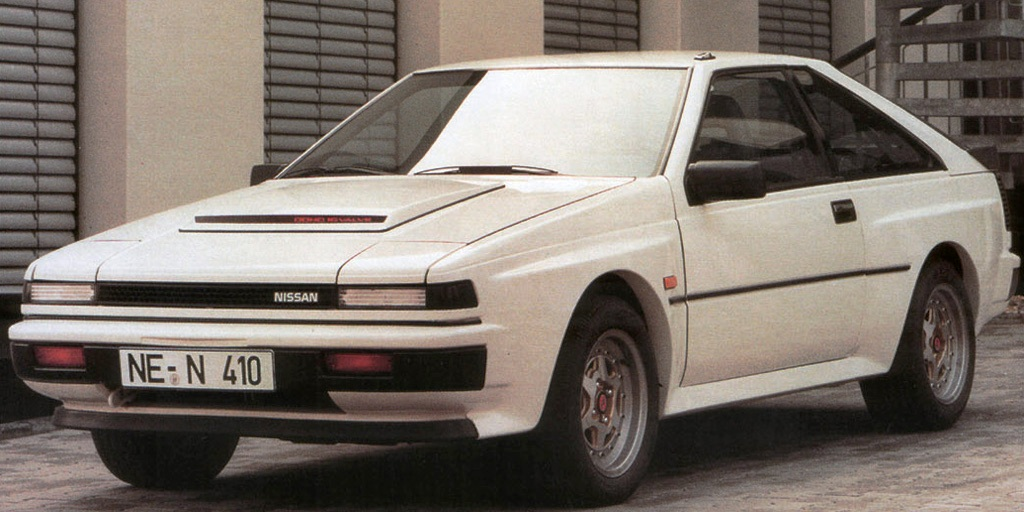
Nissan Silvia Grand Prix (Germany)

The S12 chassis in Europe was badged as a "Silvia", with a notable exception of Sweden where it was sold as the "180ZX". "ZX" is traditionally associated with the Nissan Z-cars; the name change was done to avoid giving the car the same name as the Queen of Sweden. The ZX name was also used because Nissan's Swedish importer decided to stop carrying the Z31 300ZX when the naturally aspirated version was discontinued for Europe; the Silvia acted as a partial replacement for the Z-car in that region.

The European S12 was available only in the hatchback configuration, few were equipped with a rally package that included a rally foot brace for the navigator, headlamp guards, headlamp dust cleaners, with the same 1.8L SOHC Turbo (CA18ET) used in North America, and in some areas the 2.0L DOHC "FJ" engine (FJ20E). These models equipped with the rally package were dubbed "Rally Spec". The "FJ" engine series was originally designed for the "DR30" Nissan Skyline chassis, in both turbocharged and naturally aspirated versions. The CA18ET was also available catalyzed, producing 122 PS (90 kW).

==== Australia ====
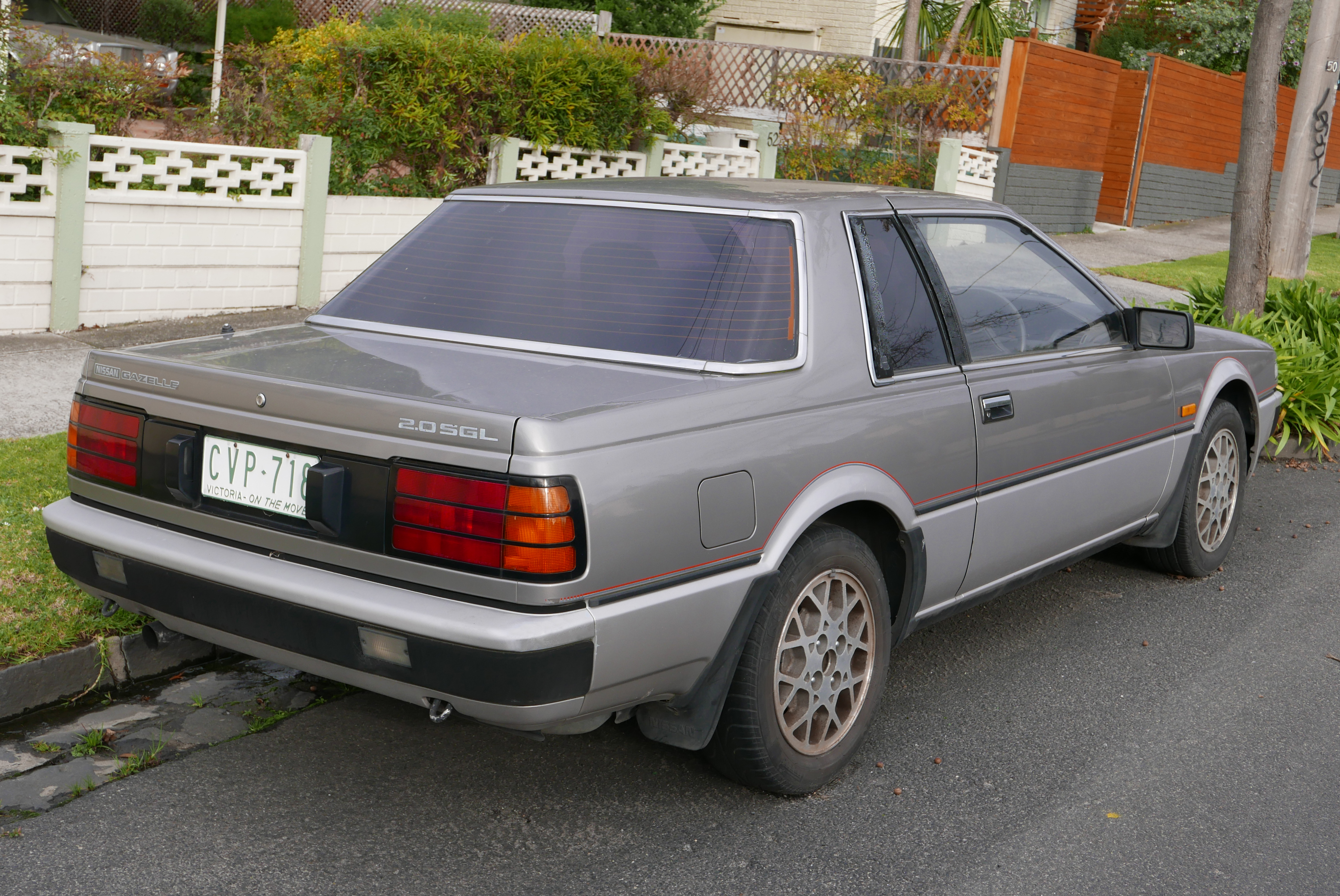
1985–1986 Nissan Gazelle SGL coupé (Australia)

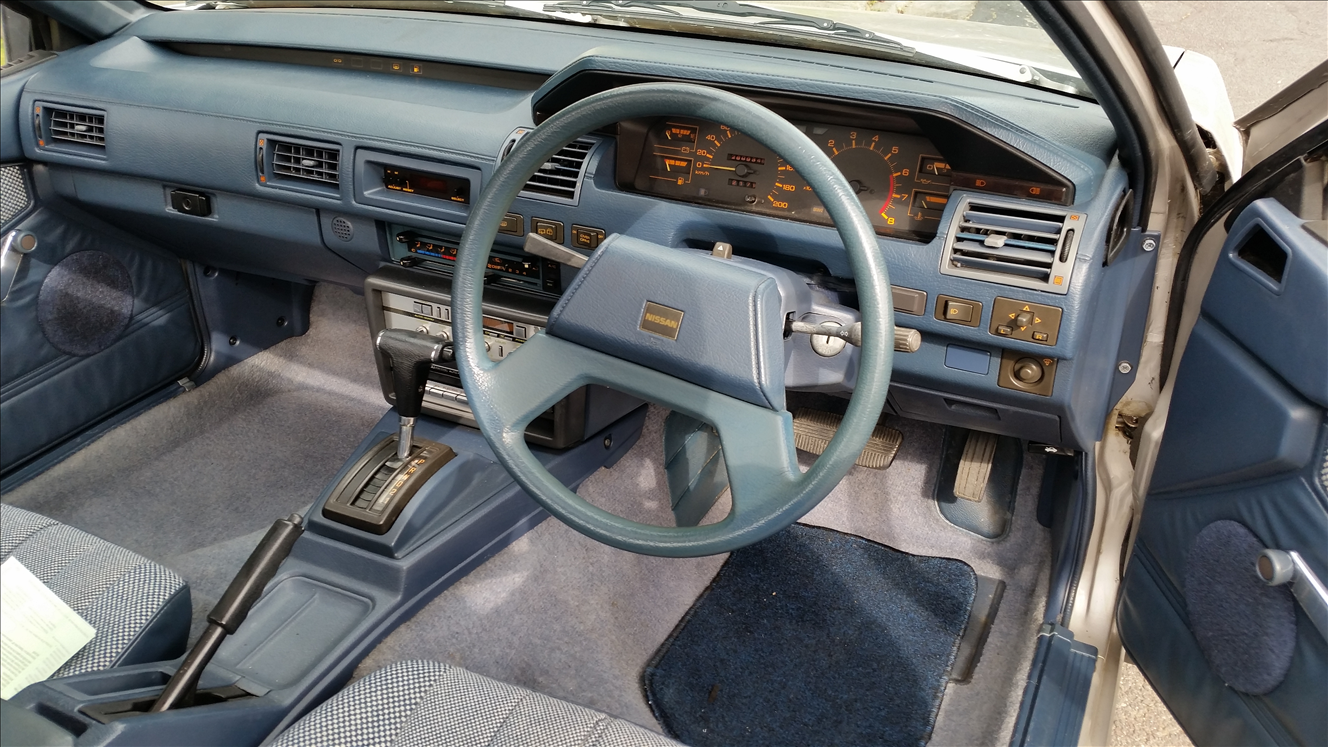
Nissan Gazelle GL interior (Australia)

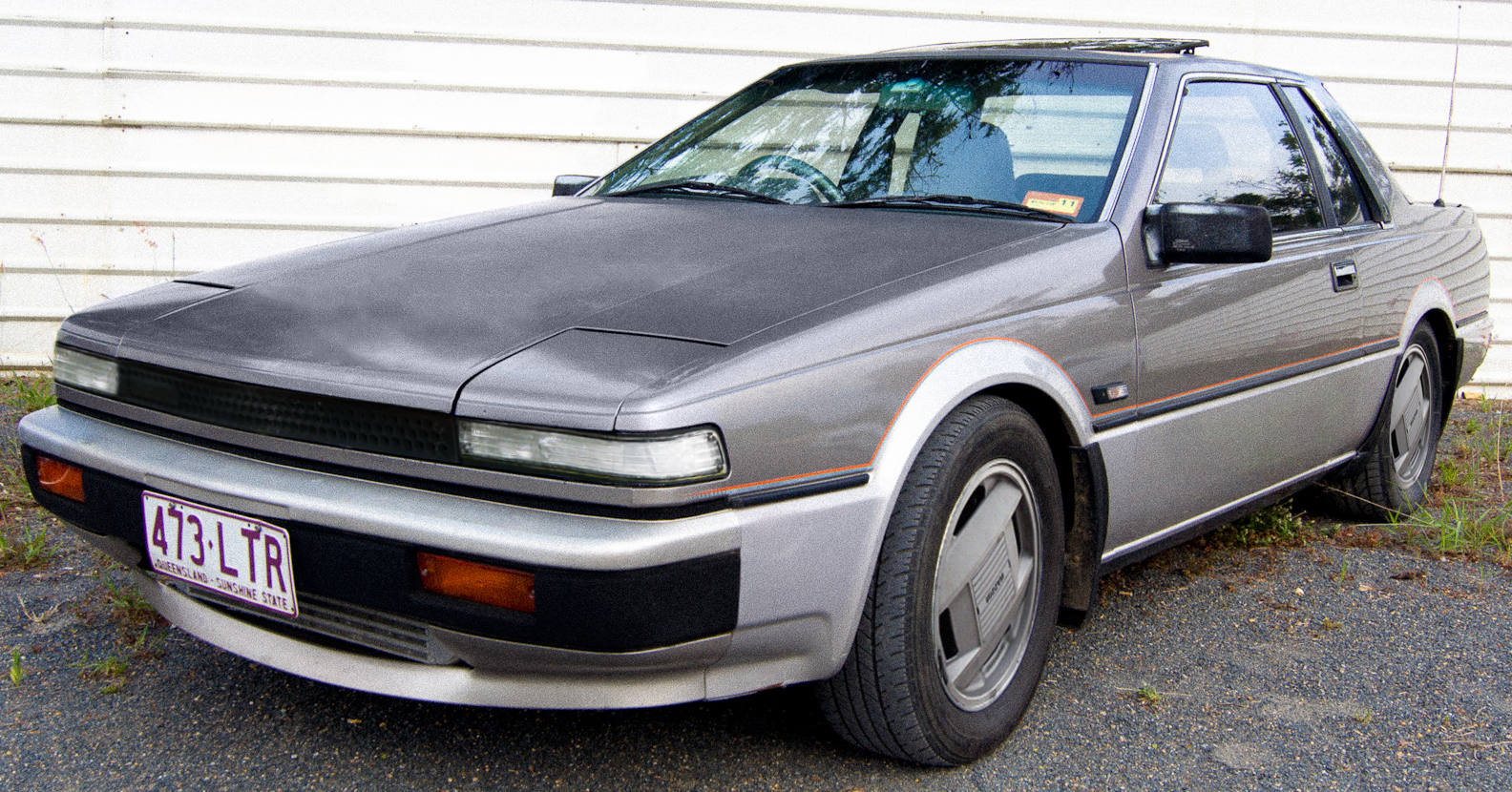
1984–1985 Nissan Gazelle SGL coupé (Australia)

The S12 chassis in Australia, released in October 1983, was badged as a Gazelle. The Australian Gazelle was available in both hatchback and coupé variants. It was equipped with the same 2.0-litre SOHC CA20E engine found in North America producing 78 kW (105 hp) at 5,200 rpm, and 160 N⋅m (118 lb⋅ft) of torque at 3,200 rpm. This engine was mated to either a five-speed manual gearbox or a four-speed automatic.

Trim levels comprised the GL hatchback (basic) and the luxury-oriented SGL coupé.

According to the May 1984 brochure, the coupé added: alloy wheels, mudflaps, electric windows/mirrors/antenna, a six speaker sound system (over four), time delay interior lighting, variable intermittent wipers, an armrest, carpet kickpads, and cloth headlining/sunvisors/door trims (over vinyl). An option pack for the coupé added air conditioning, power steering, and power sunroof. The hatchback's option pack added air conditioning, power steering, and power sunroof.

By the time of the August 1985 brochure, the coupé's option pack had been deleted, but the standard SGL coupé added power steering and a manual sunroof (a power sunroof was no longer offered). Air conditioning remained as an option, while power steering was added to the hatchback's option pack. The alloy wheel design was also changed.

The facelift model was released to Australia in late 1986.

=== Engine ===
Engine	Variance	Cylinders	Displacement	Valvetrain	Aspiration	Power	Torque	Drivetrain	Transmission
CA18S	Japan	4	1809 cc	SOHC 8-valve	natural	100 PS (99 hp; 74 kW) at 5600 rpm	149 N⋅m (110 lb⋅ft) at 2800 rpm	Rear-wheel drive	3-speed automatic / 5-speed manual
CA18E	Japan	4	1809 cc	SOHC 8-valve	natural	115 PS (113 hp; 85 kW) at 6000 rpm	162 N⋅m (119 lb⋅ft) at 3600 rpm	Rear-wheel drive	3-speed automatic / 5-speed manual
CA18ET	North America	4	1809 cc	SOHC 8-valve	Single turbo	120 hp (122 PS; 89 kW) at 5200 rpm	134 lb⋅ft (182 N⋅m) at 3200 rpm	Rear-wheel drive	4-speed automatic / 5-speed manual
CA18ET	Europe (cat.)	4	1809 cc	SOHC 8-valve	Single turbo	122 PS (120 hp; 90 kW) at 5200 rpm	184 N⋅m (136 lb⋅ft) at 3200 rpm	Rear-wheel drive	4-speed automatic / 5-speed manual
CA18ET	dual ignition, Japan/Europe	4	1809 cc	SOHC 8-valve	Single turbo	135 PS (133 hp; 99 kW) at 6000 rpm	196 N⋅m (145 lb⋅ft) at 4000 rpm	Rear-wheel drive	4-speed automatic / 5-speed manual
CA18DET	Japan	4	1809 cc	DOHC 16-valve	Single turbo	145 PS (143 hp; 107 kW) at 6400 rpm	201 N⋅m (148 lb⋅ft) at 4000 rpm	Rear-wheel drive	4-speed automatic / 5-speed manual
CA20E	North America	4	1974 cc	SOHC 8-valve	Natural	102 hp (103 PS; 76 kW) at 5200 rpm	116 lb⋅ft (157 N⋅m) at 3200 rpm	Rear-wheel drive	4-speed automatic / 5-speed manual
CA20E	dual ignition, Australia	4	1974 cc	SOHC 8-valve	Natural	78 kW (105 hp; 106 PS) at 5200 rpm	160 N⋅m (118 lb⋅ft) at 3200 rpm	Rear-wheel drive	4-speed automatic / 5-speed manual
FJ20E	Germany	4	1990 cc	DOHC 16-valve	Natural	145 PS (143 hp; 107 kW) at 6400 rpm	129 lb⋅ft (175 N⋅m) at 4800 rpm	Rear-wheel drive	5-speed manual
FJ20ET	—N/a	4	1990 cc	DOHC 16-valve	Single turbo	190 PS (187 hp; 140 kW) at 6500 rpm	226 N⋅m (166 lb⋅ft) at 4800 rpm	Rear-wheel drive	5-speed manual
VG30E	North America (1987)	6	2960 cc	SOHC 12-valve	Natural	160 hp (162 PS; 119 kW) at 5200 rpm	174 lb⋅ft (236 N⋅m) at 4800 rpm	Rear-wheel drive	4-speed automatic / 5-speed manual
VG30E	North America (1988)	6	2960 cc	SOHC 12-valve	Natural	165 hp (167 PS; 123 kW) at 5200 rpm	174 lb⋅ft (236 N⋅m) at 4800 rpm	Rear-wheel drive	4-speed automatic / 5-speed manual

== S13 ==
Nissan Silvia (S13)
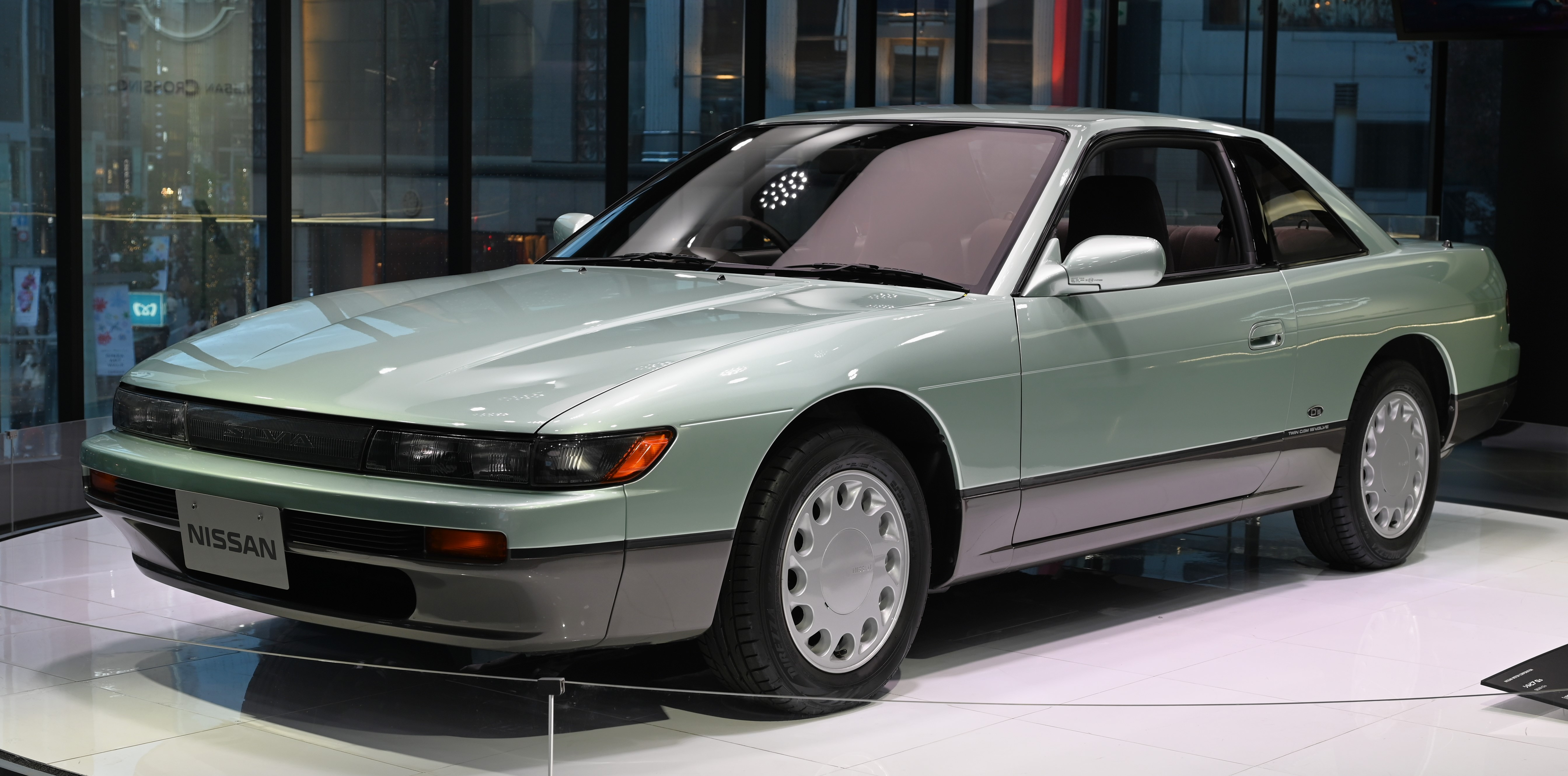
- Pre-facelift Nissan Silvia Q's (PS13, Japan)

Overview
- Production: May 1988 – October 1993
- Assembly: Japan: Kanda, Fukuoka (Nissan Shatai Plant)
- Designer: Kōichirō Kawamura

Body and chassis
- Body style: 2-door coupé 2-door convertible 2-door fastback/hatchback
- Platform: Nissan S platform
- Related: Nissan 180SX; Nissan 200SX (Europe and Asia); Nissan 240SX (North America)

Powertrain
- Engine: 1.8 L CA18DE I4; 1.8 L CA18DET turbo I4; 2.0 L SR20DE I4; 2.0 L SR20DET turbo I4
- Transmission: 4-speed automatic 5-speed manual

Dimensions
- Wheelbase: 2,475 mm (97.4 in)
- Length: 4,521 mm (178.0 in)
- Width: 1,689 mm (66.5 in)
- Height: 1,290 mm (50.8 in)
- Curb weight: 1,180–1,224 kg (2,601–2,698 lb)

The S13 Silvia was introduced in May 1988. Beginning with this generation, Nissan replaced the Gazelle with the 180SX, which served as the junior companion to the Fairlady Z at Nissan Store Japanese dealerships. As before, the Silvia was exclusive to Japanese dealerships called Nissan Prince Store next to the Skyline. This generation became popular in its home market and won the 1988 Car of the Year Japan Award in its first year of production.

Starting with this generation, the Silvia was no longer exported; instead, rebadged 180SXs were sold in most markets. European versions of the S13 Silvia were sold as the 200SX, while in North America it was known as the 240SX, all of which used the 180SX front-end. The 200SX nameplate was on hiatus in that region, however it would eventually return on a 2-door coupé version of the B14 Sunny/Sentra (1995–99) (itself based on the Japan-only 2-door Lucino) that replaced the 2-door coupé B13 Sunny/Sentra (1991–94) and NX.

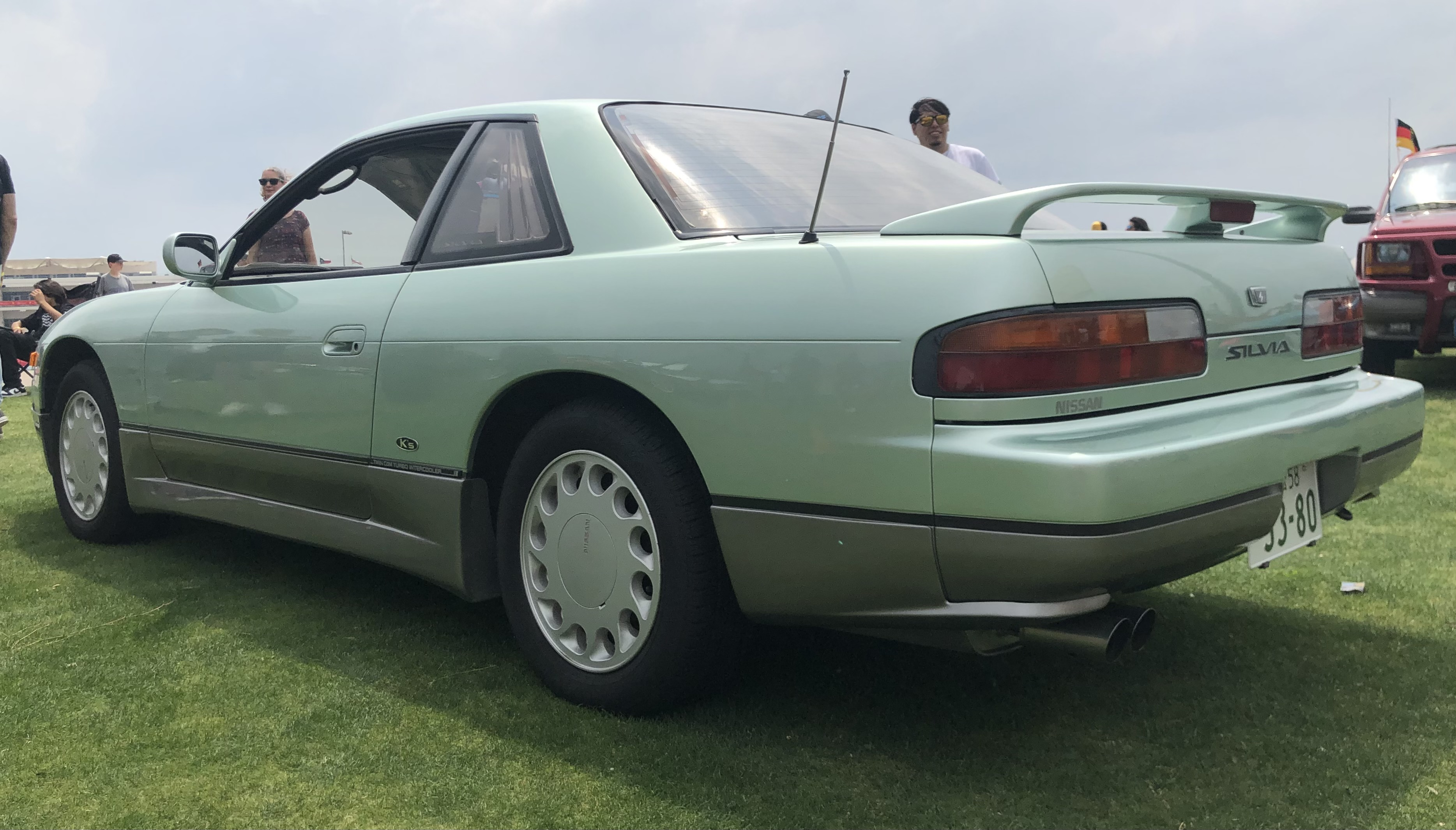
Pre-facelift Nissan Silvia K's rear

The S13 Silvia was primarily sold as a 2-door coupé (with some convertible models being sold in limited quantities). The 3-door hatchback version of the S13 Silvia was called the 180SX (which replaced the Gazelle). The North American 240SX, itself an export version of the 180SX, was offered in all three different body-styles, including hatchback, coupé and convertible models (all of which wore the 180SX's front clip, the fixed headlight Silvia front end was never an option in that market). Following industry trends, the S13 Silvia switched to fixed relampable headlights. The 180SX, introduced at the same time as the S13 Silvia, used retractable pop-up headlights. Projector optics were offered as an option.

The S13 was one of the first uses of Nissan's multi-link rear suspension, the technology of which was previewed in concept cars in previous years such as the Nissan MID4. It also offered a four-wheel steering system for the first time, known as HICAS. The S13 Silvia came with an updated version of HICAS as used on the R31 Skyline GTS known as HICAS-II, which was updated and renamed as Super HICAS in 1990. The S13 also saw the introduction of a viscous-type limited-slip differential for some models. The Silvia also featured Head Up Display (HUD), front windshield display which was very high-tech at in the late 1980s.

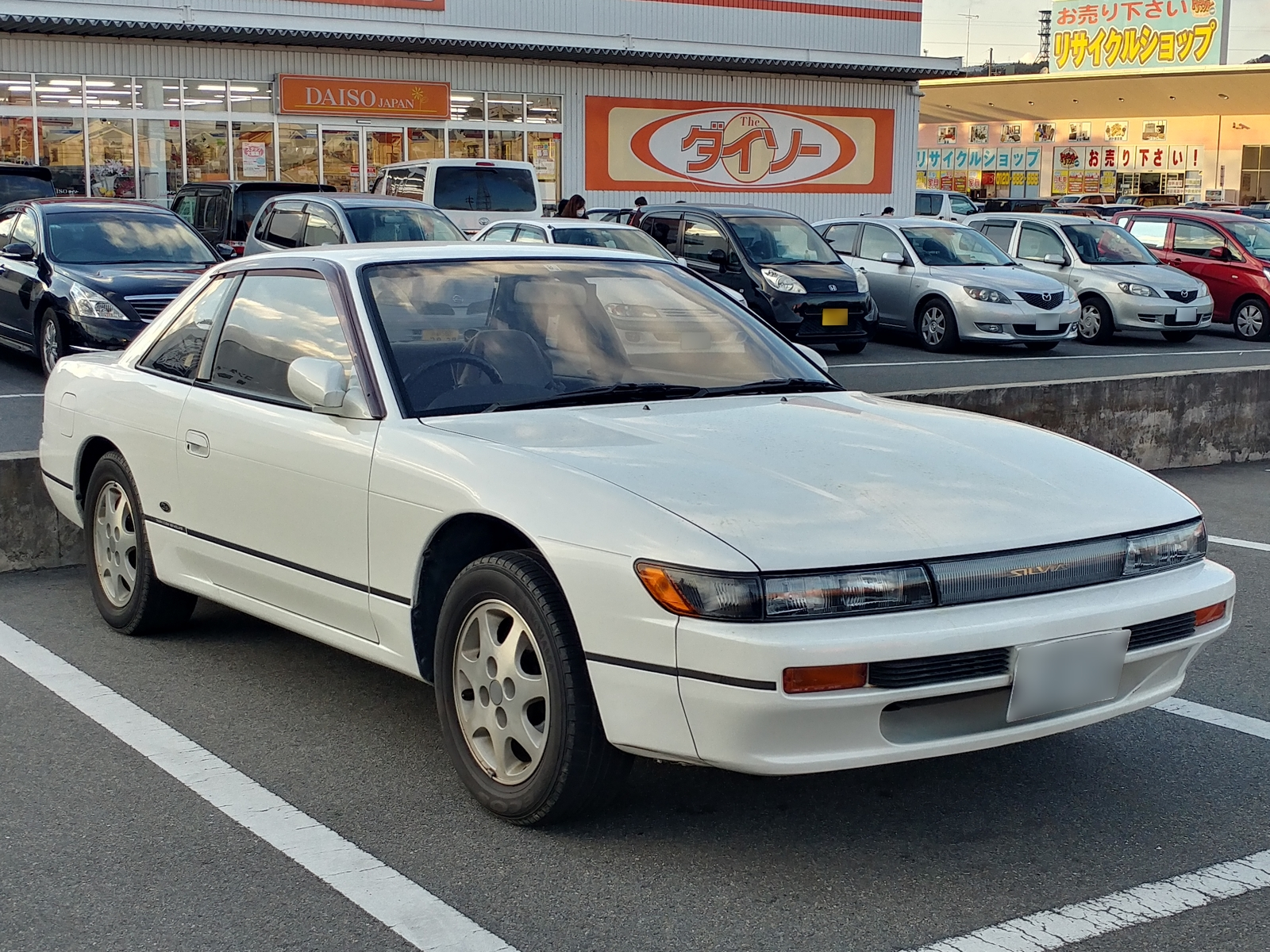
Facelift Nissan Silvia Q's (PS13)

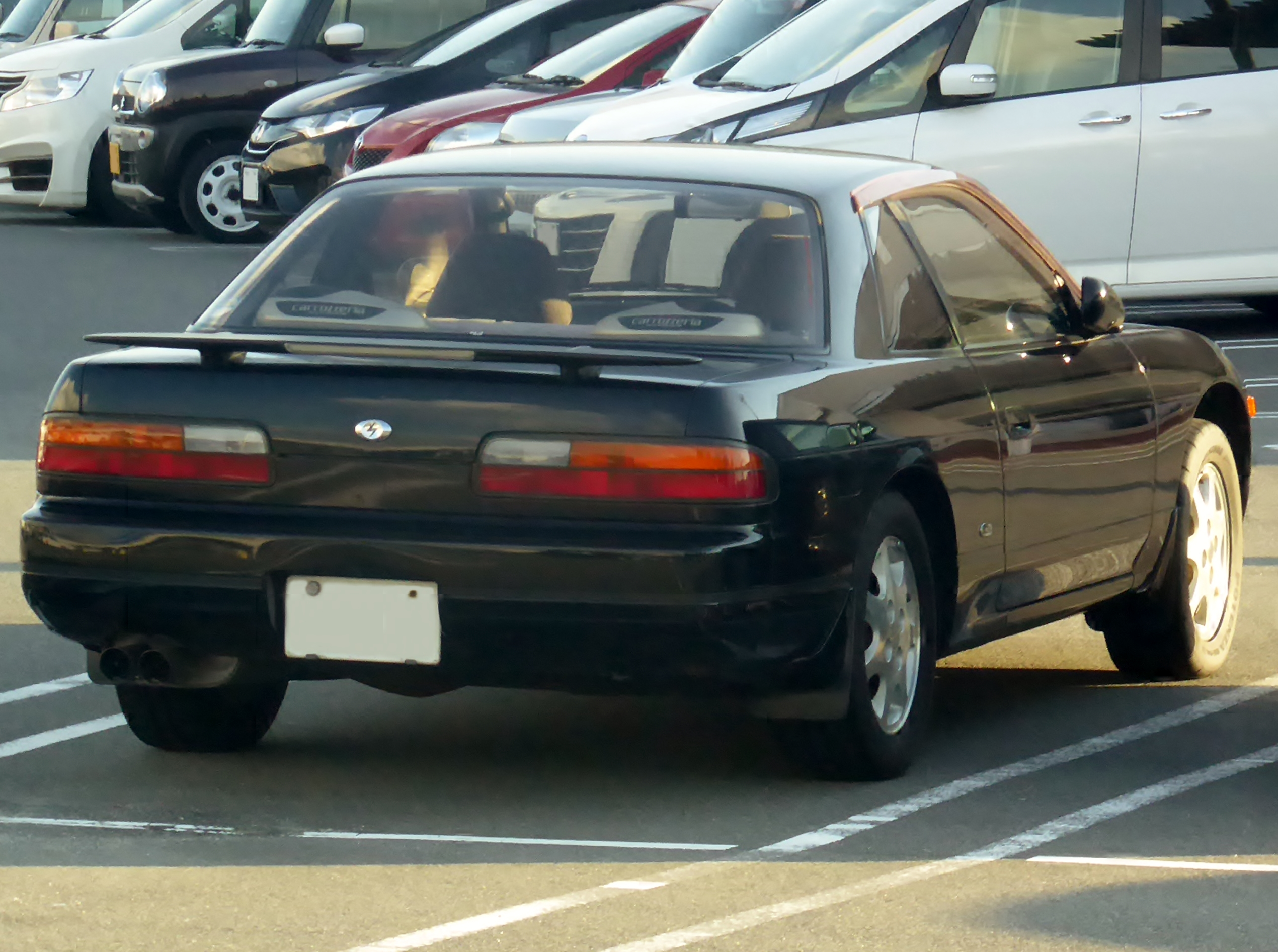
Facelift Nissan Silvia Q's rear (PS13)

S13 Silvias were initially powered by the CA18DE and CA18DET engines carried over from the end of S12 production, with an intercooler added to the CA18DET for a slight increase in stability and power. The naturally aspirated engine was offered in the J's and Q's model, while the turbocharged engine came in the K's.

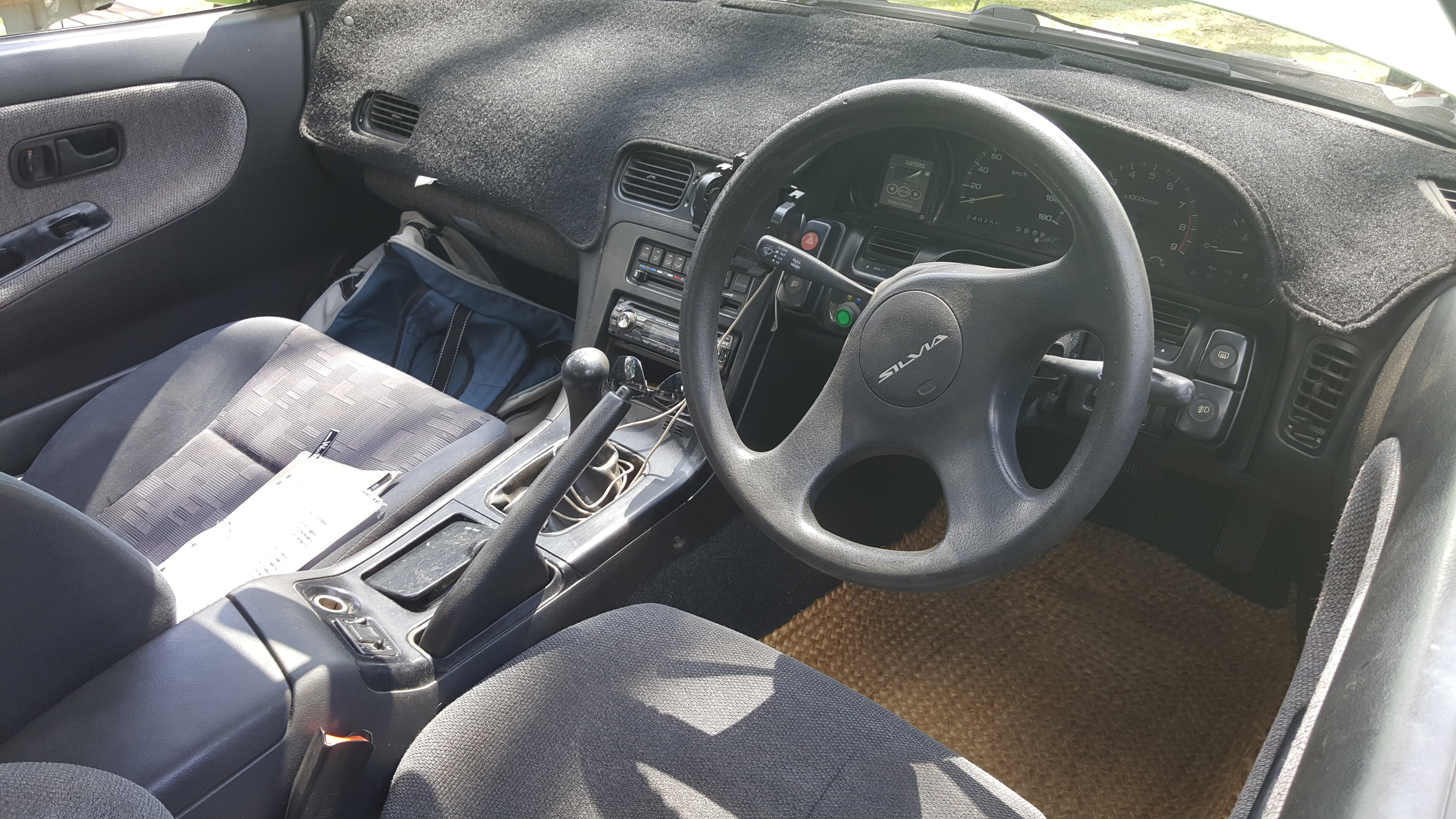
Facelift Interior

In January 1991, the SR20DE and SR20DET engines debuted, offering improvements across the board in power and torque due to increased displacement and a more efficient turbocharger than was offered on the previous cars. On top of this, the SR motor later debuted another variant of the platform known simply as the "blacktop". Identifiable by its black and silver rocker-cover (as opposed to the traditional red/silver cover), it featured a number of minor changes, which resulted in little performance gains. It is vastly different from the more powerful "notch top" used in the S14 and S15 variants. One of the simple changes that were made between the CA generation and the SR generation was the switch to a single colour paint job instead of the two-tone colour sets that were previously offered, with only a few two-tone colour options available.

The S13 Silvia coupé was made from 1988 to 1993, overlapping with the S14 Silvia when it was introduced in 1993. In the U.S., the S13 was replaced after the 1994 model year by the new S14 design, however it lived on in Japan for a few years with a major facelift, the revised 180SX Type X/Type S/Type R in 1996. This is known as the "Kouki" generation, while the previous (or 'middle') generation was referred to as "Chuki" (the earliest generation was referred to as "Zenki"). Sold alongside the then-current S14 models, these Kouki models featured newly designed tail-lights and a redesigned aero body kit, along with being outfitted with an airbag. The 180SX hatchback remained in production until 1998.

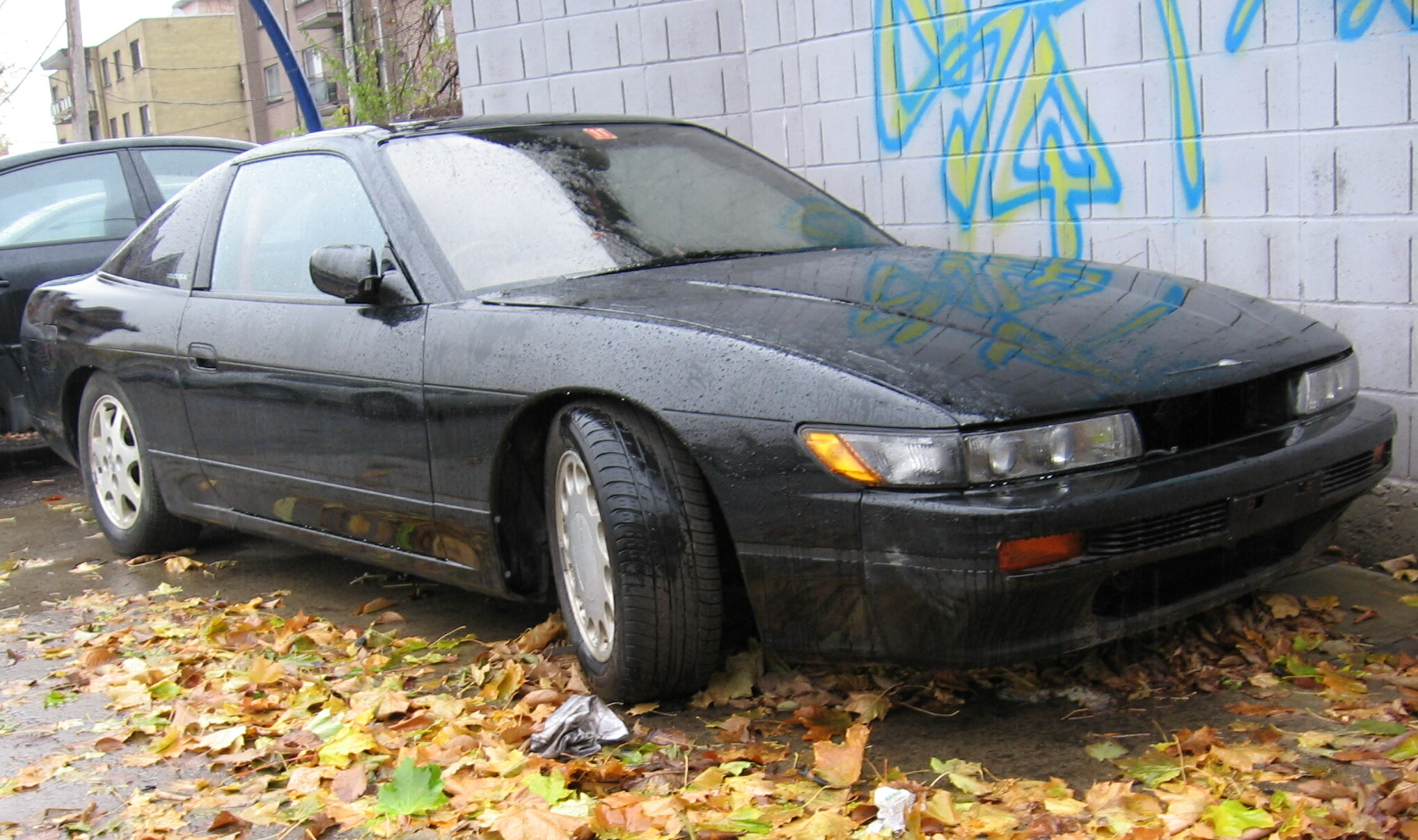
An unofficial Sileighty

In May 1998, the S13 Silvia was resurrected, in part, by a variant produced by Japanese tuning company Kid's Heart for Nissan called the Sileighty, featuring the 180SX hatchback body with the front end of the Silvia. Despite being a modified car, the original Sileighty was sold through Nissan dealers, with only about 500 units being produced. Originally created by Japanese enthusiasts for their own 180SXs, the Sileighty remains a common modification for both the 180SX and 240SX fastback. It was then followed up by another version of the Silvia known as the Onevia. Based on the chassis of the S13 Silvia coupé, the front end was replaced with the front end of a 180SX. The Onevia was never retailed as a complete car in Japan (though it was in North America: the coupé version of the 240SX uses the same body shell as the S13 Silvia but with the 180SX/240SX nose). A Sileighty appears in the Japanese manga and anime series Initial D (based around the Japanese motorsports of tōge and drifting), where it was featured in one of the earliest battles in the manga and one of the last battles in the First Stage anime.

Mitsuoka also produced a limited-run retro-styled car based on the S13 Silvia called the Le-Seyde, which was built in a very limited series in 1990. It uses the S13 Silvia's centre portion, engine, and underpinnings.

=== Convertible ===
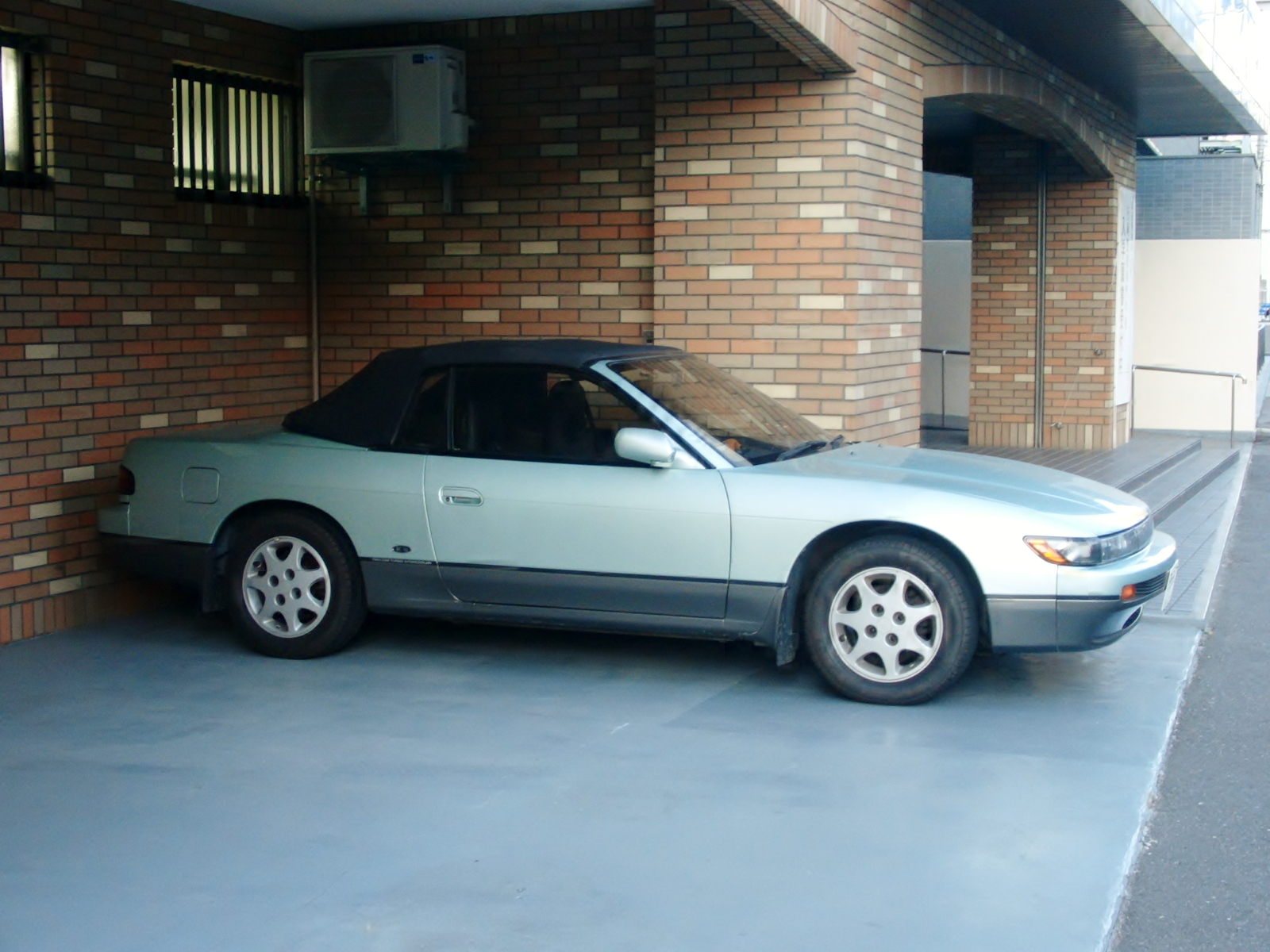
1988 Nissan Silvia Convertible finished in two-tone green lime

A Silvia convertible was briefly offered soon after it started production and was sold in limited numbers. It was a conversion done by Autech, and production was entrusted to Takada Kogyo and began production in July 1988.

A total of 603 Autech convertibles were produced, and came with the following colour codes: TH1 - velvet blue (430), 5G7 - green two-tone lime (50), 5H6 - warm two-tone white (70), AH3 - cranberry red (40), and DH0 dark green (10). The other three were made to order for Nissan and the colours are unknown. All of the 600 publicly available cars came equipped with the K's trim grade, which includes the turbocharged CA18DET engine, and was sold with a 4-speed automatic transmission. Demand was low due to high cost (3.25 million Yen in 1988), heavier curb weight, and chassis flex.

The 240SX convertible offered in North America in 1993 to 1994 was built separately from the Japanese market Silvia convertible and is unrelated to it, and was a local conversion done by ASC rather than Autech.

=== Trim level designations ===
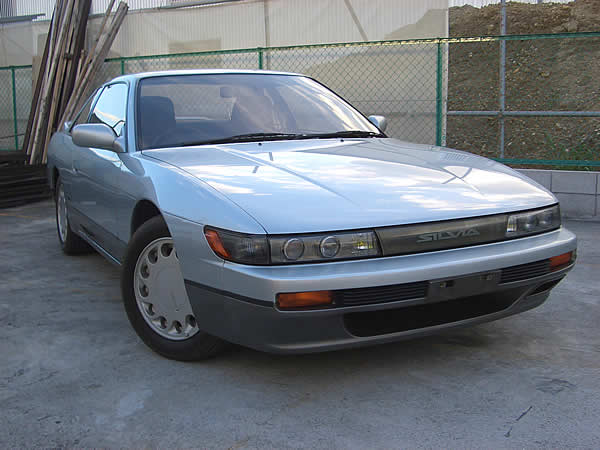
Pre-facelift Nissan Silvia K's (S13)

The S13 Silvia was the first S-series car to use the J's, Q's, and K's designations for its different trim packages. These names are references to the face cards of English playing cards.

The J's was the base model. The Q's model offered a slightly more refined experience and received electric options and an available LSD. The K's grade received the turbocharged CA18DET or SR20DET (depending on the year of manufacture) in addition to the options offered on the Q's.

On top of the K's and Q's models, the Diamond Selection (released in 1990) and Club packages (released in 1992) came with specific options bundled together. For example, all K's Club Selections came with projector headlamps, a rear spoiler, and 15-inch aluminum wheels while all Q's models came out with automatic climate control.

Late in the S13 Silvia's production, the J's base model trim was replaced with the new A's "Almighty" (or "Ace") base model trim in December 1992. Trim-wise, the Almighty offered options not available on the J's (such as the 15-inch alloy wheels) but also not including all the standard features of the Q's (power windows and sunroof). The only available powertrain was the naturally aspirated SR20DE with a five-speed manual transmission, the same as on the Q's.

At least three different headlight designs were used during the lifespan of the S13 Silvia, including triple projectors, dual projectors and square projectors (usually referred to as "bricks").

=== Engine ===
	CA18DE	CA18DET	SR20DE	SR20DET
Aspiration	Naturally Aspirated	Single Turbo	Naturally Aspirated	Single Turbo
Valvetrain	DOHC 16 valve			
Cylinders	4			
Displacement	1809cc		1998cc	
Power at rpm	135 PS (99 kW; 133 hp) at 6400	175 PS (129 kW; 173 hp) at 6400	140 PS (103 kW; 138 hp) at 6400	205 PS (151 kW; 202 hp) at 6000
Torque at rpm	159 N⋅m (117 lb⋅ft) at 4000	225 N⋅m (166 lbf⋅ft) at 4000	178 N⋅m (131 lbf⋅ft) at 4800	274 N⋅m (202 lbf⋅ft) at 4000
Drivetrain	Rear wheel drive			
Transmission	4-speed automatic/5-speed manual			

== S14 ==
Nissan Silvia (S14)
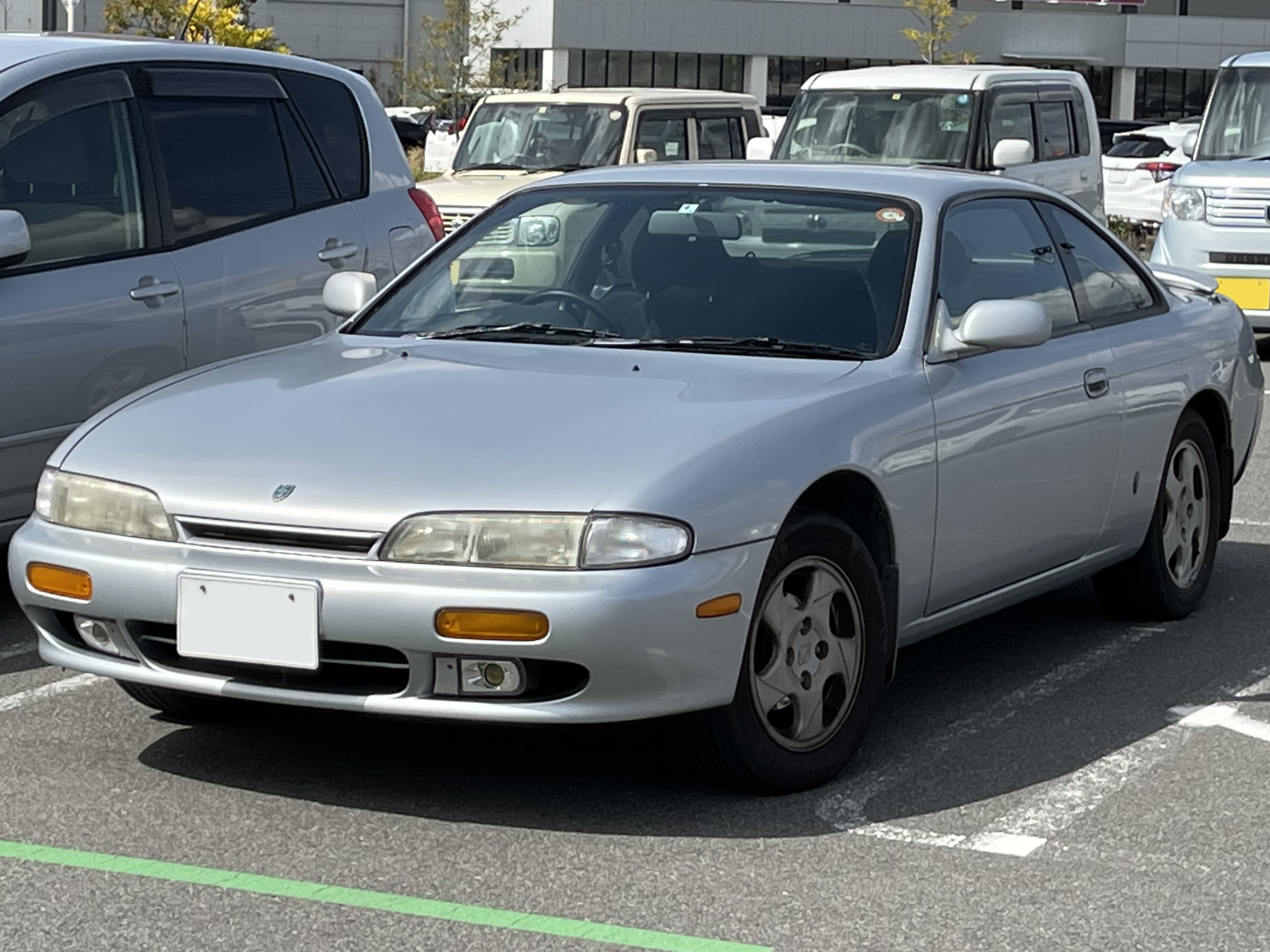
- Pre-facelift Nissan Silvia Q's (E-S14; Japan)

Overview
- Also called: Nissan 200SX; Nissan 240SX (North America)
- Production: October 1993 – November 1998 (Japan); 1994–2000 (International)
- Assembly: Japan: Kanda, Fukuoka (Nissan Shatai Plant)
- Designer: Hiroshi Hasegawa

Body and chassis
- Body style: 2-door coupé
- Platform: Nissan S platform

Powertrain
- Engine: 2.0 L SR20DE I4; 2.0 L SR20DET I4 turbo; 2.4 L KA24DE I4
- Transmission: 4-speed automatic; 5-speed manual

Dimensions
- Wheelbase: 2,525 mm (99.4 in)
- Length: 4,520 mm (178.0 in)
- Width: 1,730 mm (68.1 in)
- Height: 1,295 mm (51.0 in)
- Curb weight: 1,253 kg (2,762 lb)

The S14 Silvia debuted in Japan towards the October 1993. It was lower and wider than the S13. New rounded styling contributed to the illusion of a greater increase in size than actually occurred. Wheelbase and track were both increased, leading to slightly improved handling. The fastback and convertible bodystyles were discontinued internationally, leaving only the coupé in production. It was sold as the second generation 240SX in North America from 1995 to 1998, equipped with the non-turbo KA24DE engine.

Trim level designations were similar to the S13, however the Club Selection package was dropped. "Aero" variants of the Q's and K's were offered that featured large rear wings and mild ground effects. The S14 Silvia K's received a new version of the SR20DET, with a slight bump in power due to the implementation of Nissan's variable cam timing system known as N-VCT, on the intake cam, and a larger T28 turbocharger. The engine now produced 220 PS (162 kW; 217 hp) at 6000 rpm and 274 N⋅m (202 lb⋅ft) of torque at 4800 rpm.

There was a mild styling update to the S14 during 1996, which added aggressive-looking projector headlamps and tinted taillights to all models. The older version is known as the zenki (前期, literally "prior period"). Fascias and other exterior trim pieces were also revised. The turbocharger now used a more efficient ball bearing center section. This updated version is also known as the kouki (後期, literally "later period") S14, or by enthusiasts as the S14A.

Unlike export markets, where sales of the S14 chassis variants faltered, the Silvia remained popular in Japan. However, the width dimension exceeded 1,700 mm (67 in), which pushed this generation out of the compact class tax bracket and made Japanese buyers liable for higher road taxes. Sales of the S14 also faltered because specialty car buyers at the time were moving to RVs and SUVs.

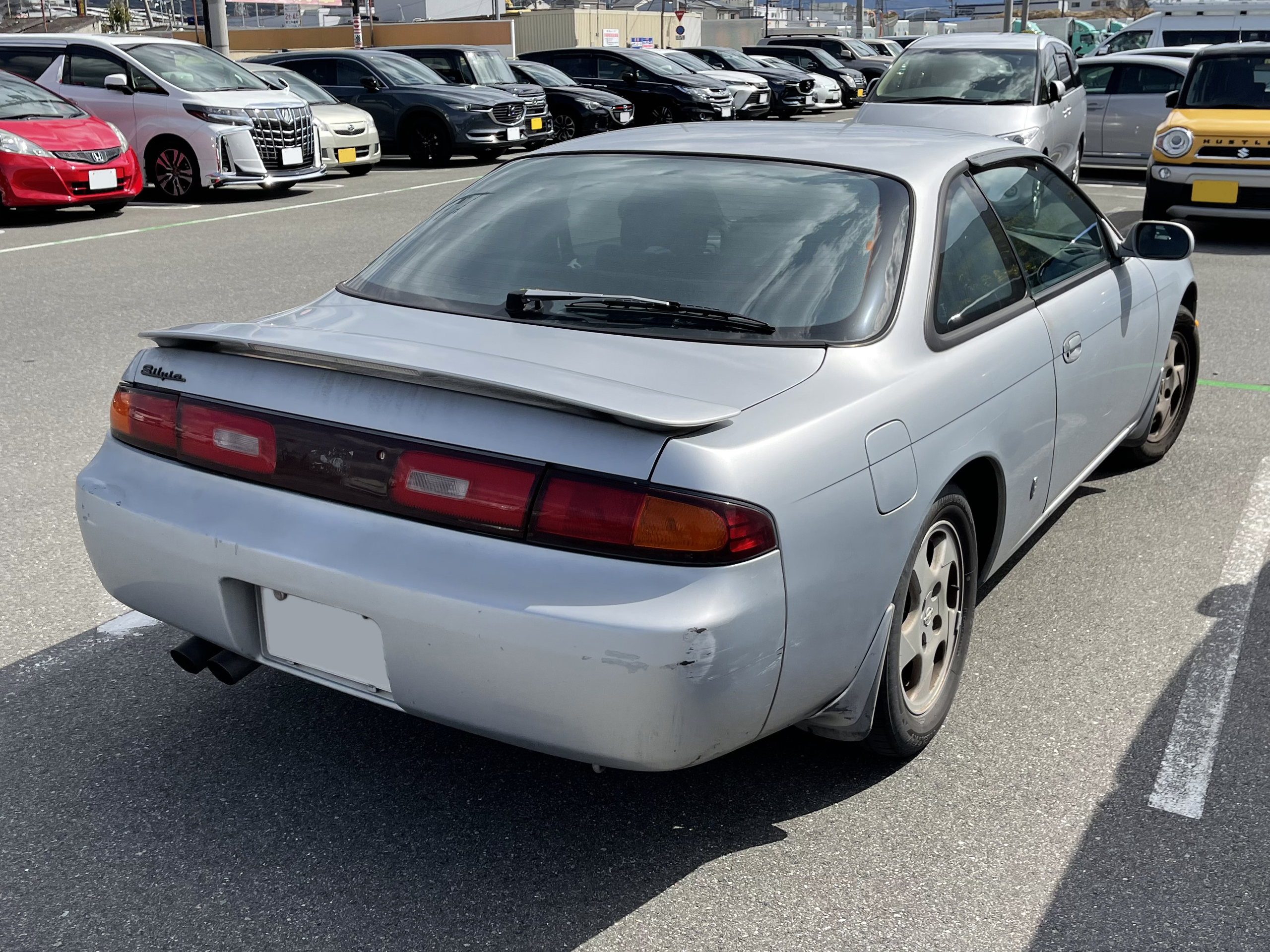
Rear view (pre-facelift)

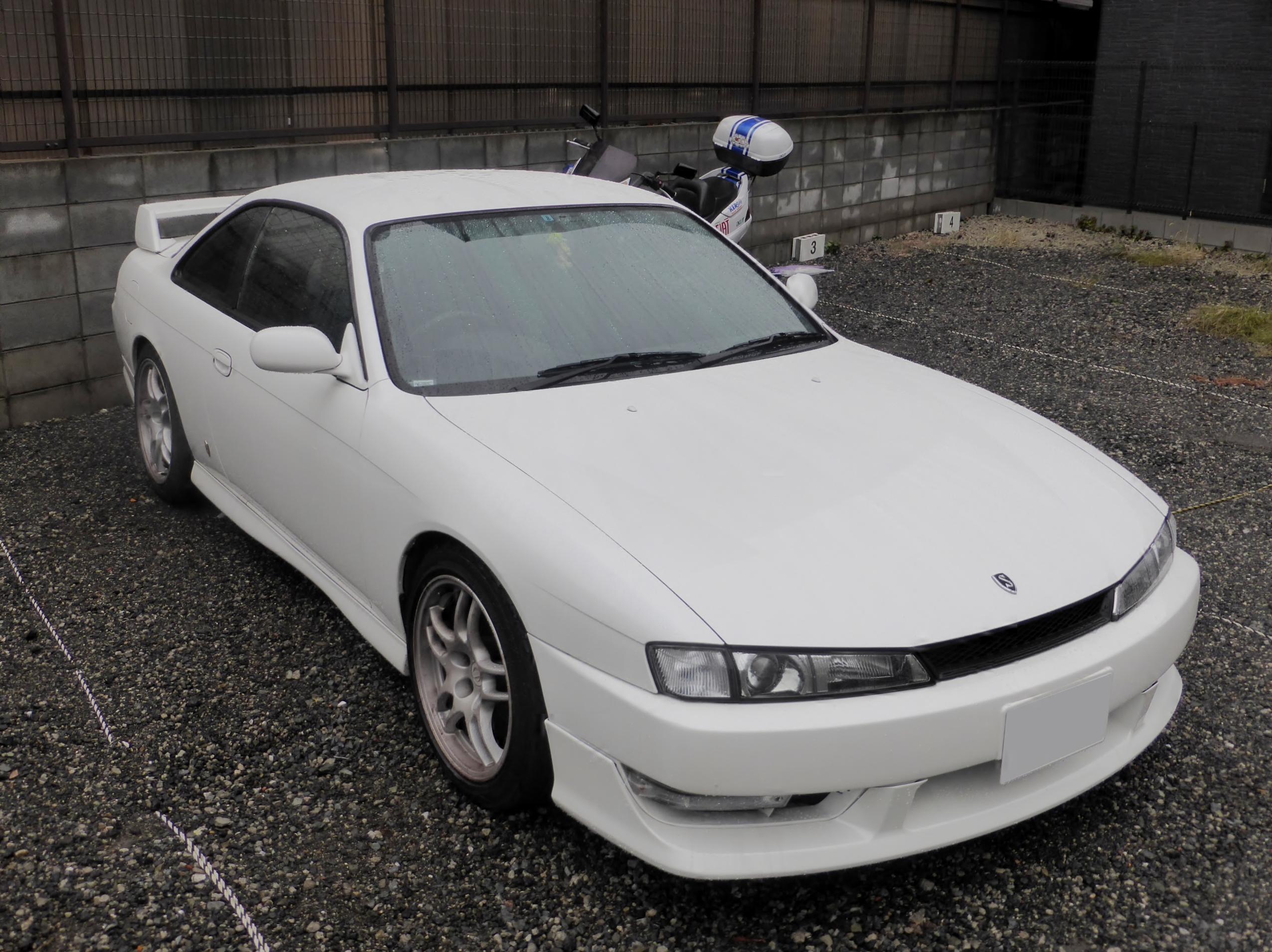
Nissan Silvia K's SE

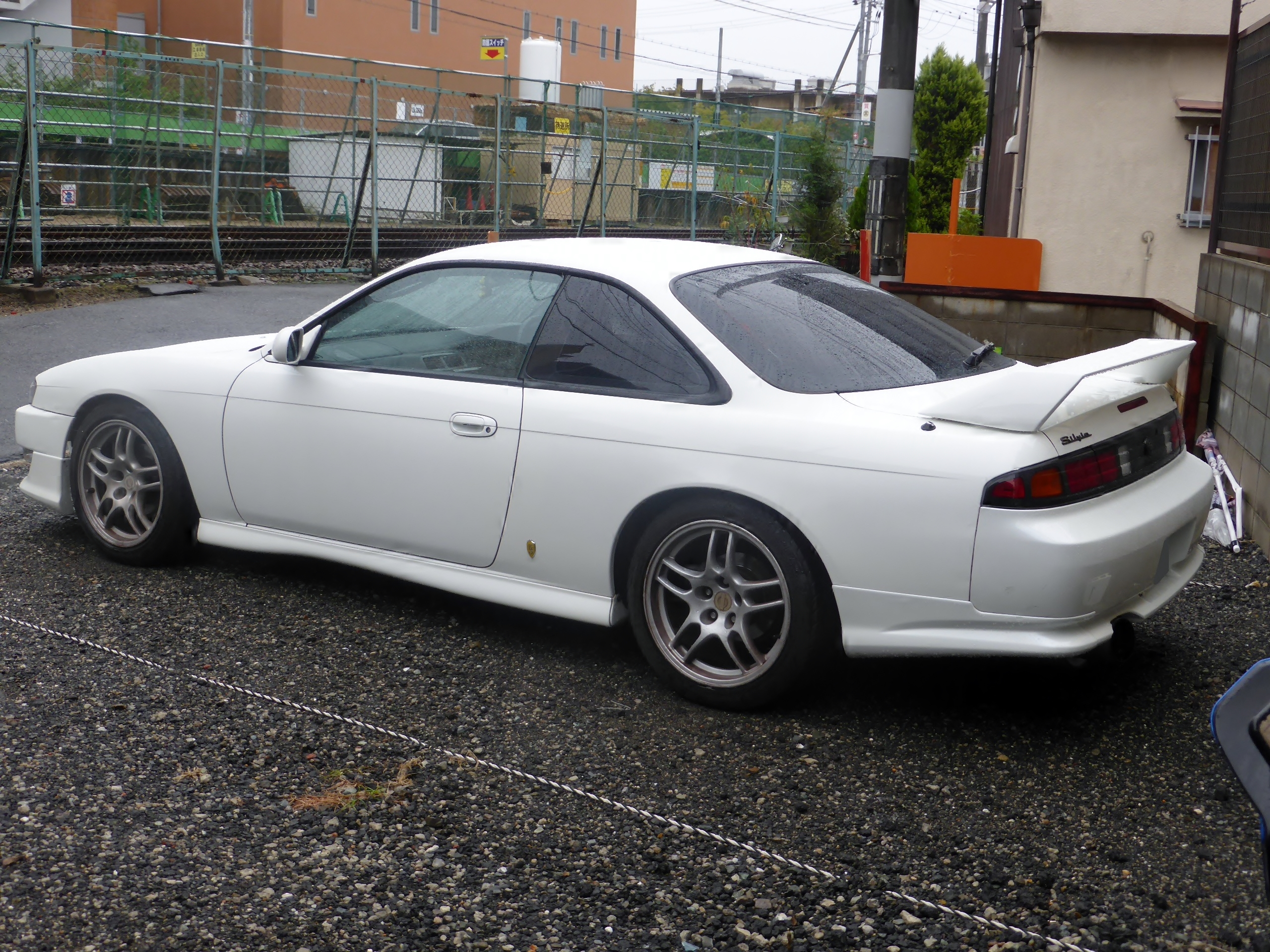
Nissan Silvia K's SE

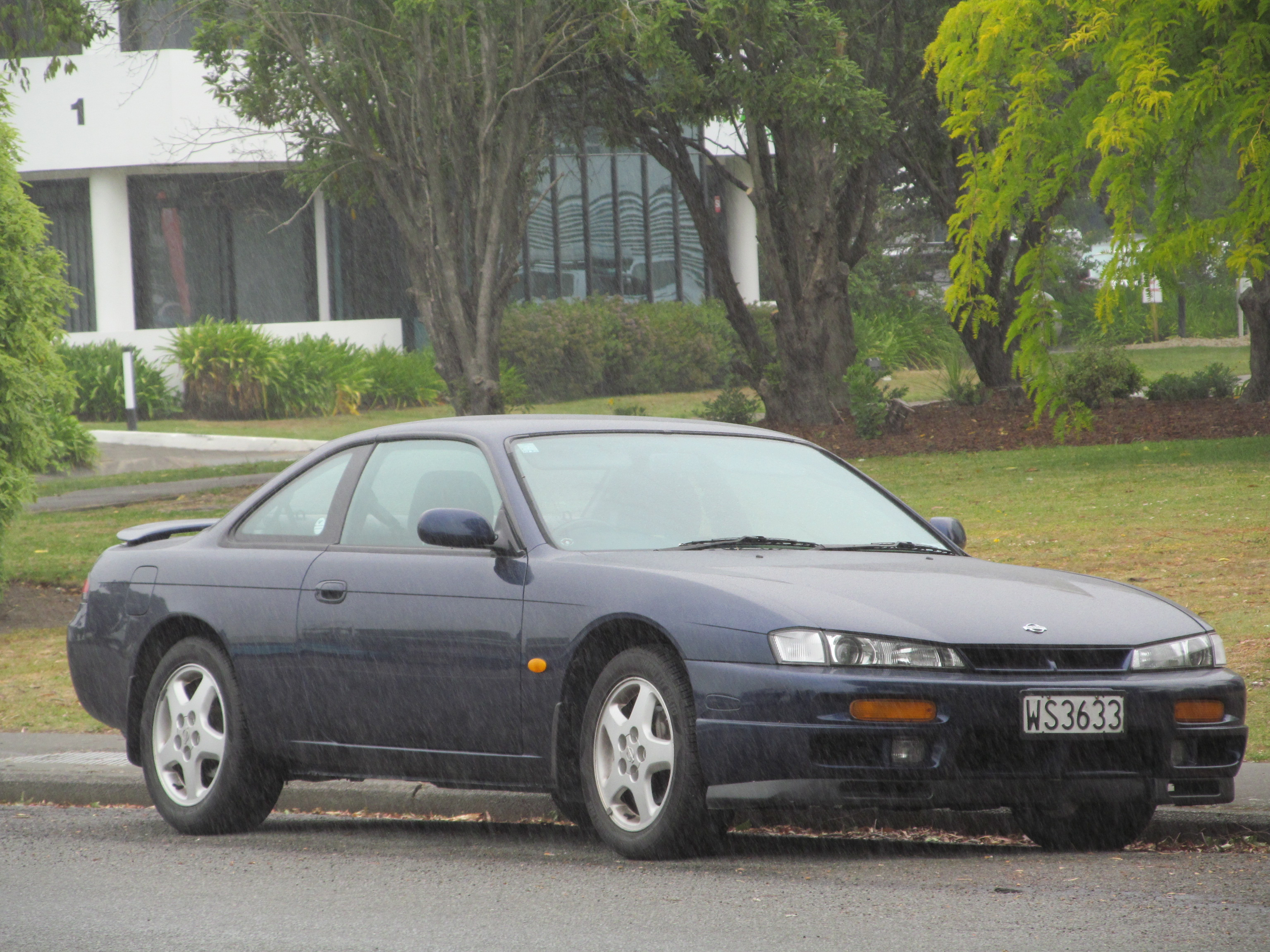
Facelift model Nissan 200SX (S14) in New Zealand

=== Nismo 270R ===
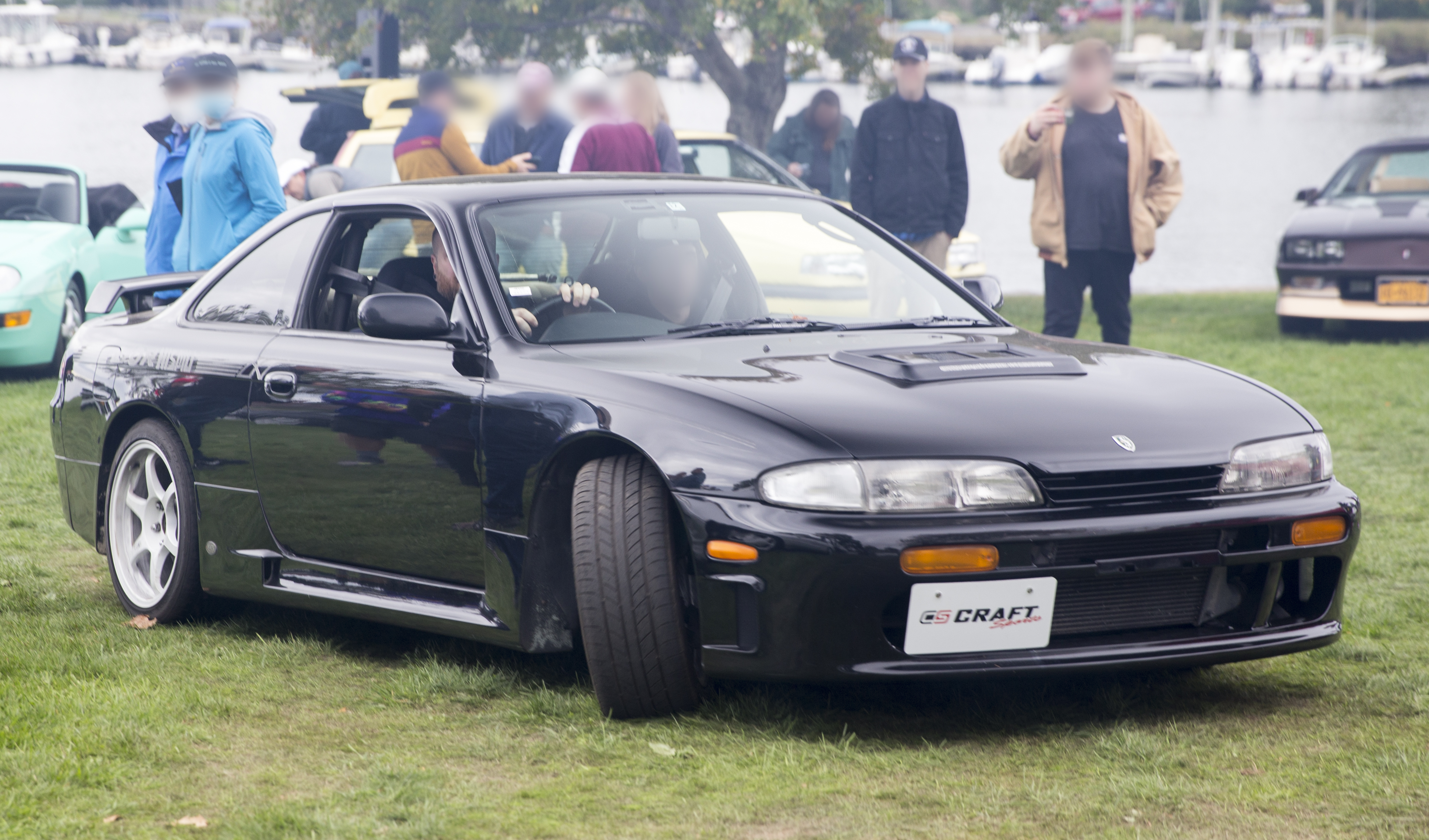

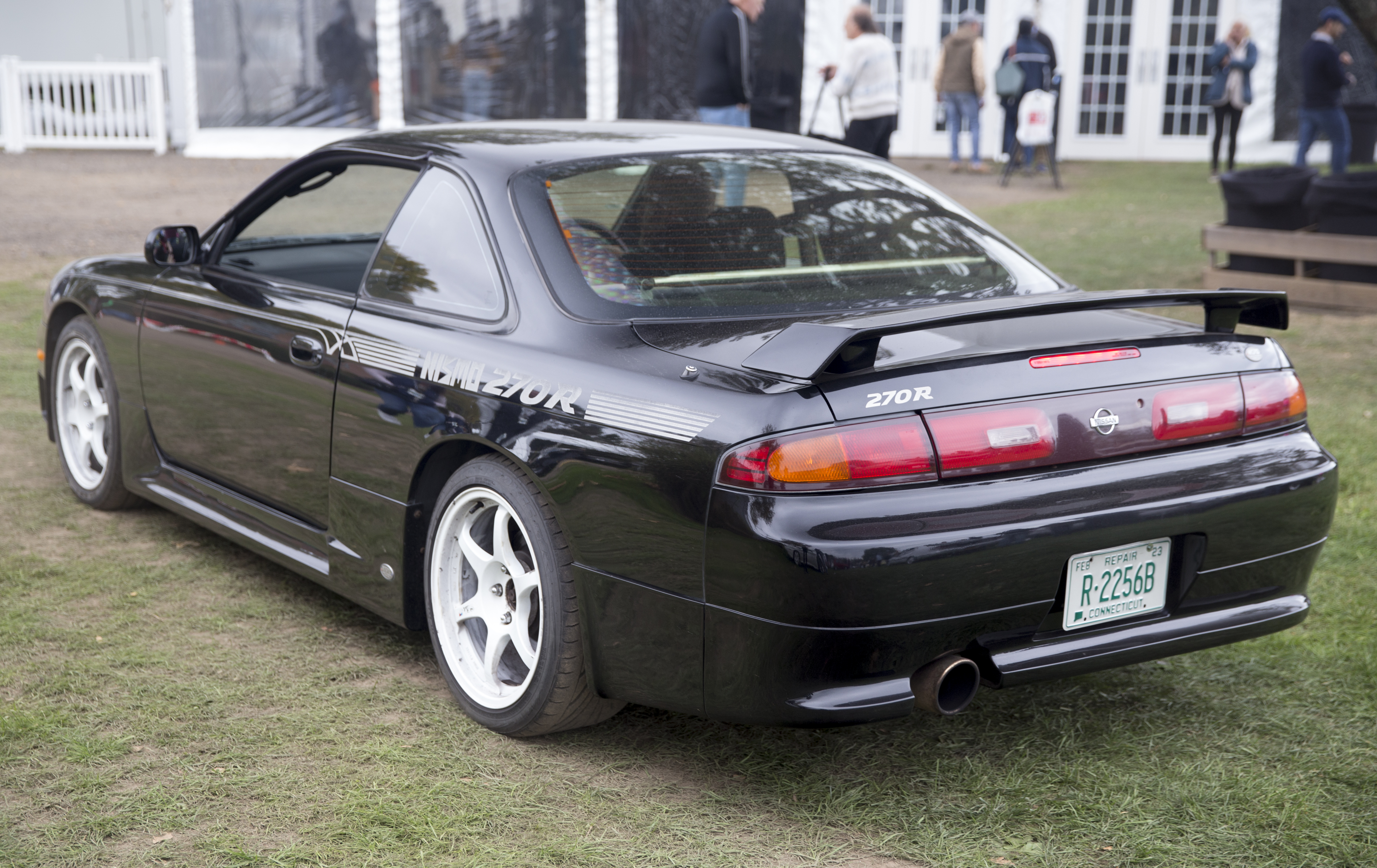
1994 Silvia Nismo 270R

The 270R is a limited-edition version of the S14 developed by Nissan Motorsports to commemorate the 10th anniversary of Nismo, produced only in 1994. The vehicle was built on the S14 chassis but had many enhancements over the Silvia. The '270' is in reference to the horsepower of the car as opposed to the displacement of the engine. The 270R featured a vented hood with a front-mounted intercooler, Nismo 'Edge' Aero kit, heavy duty clutch, 2-way limited-slip differential, NISMO logo front and rear seats among other upgrades. All the 270s were painted Black with 'Nismo 270R' badging above the rear wheels and a product numbered plaque in the glove compartment. Only 50 270Rs were built.

=== Autech Version K's MF-T ===
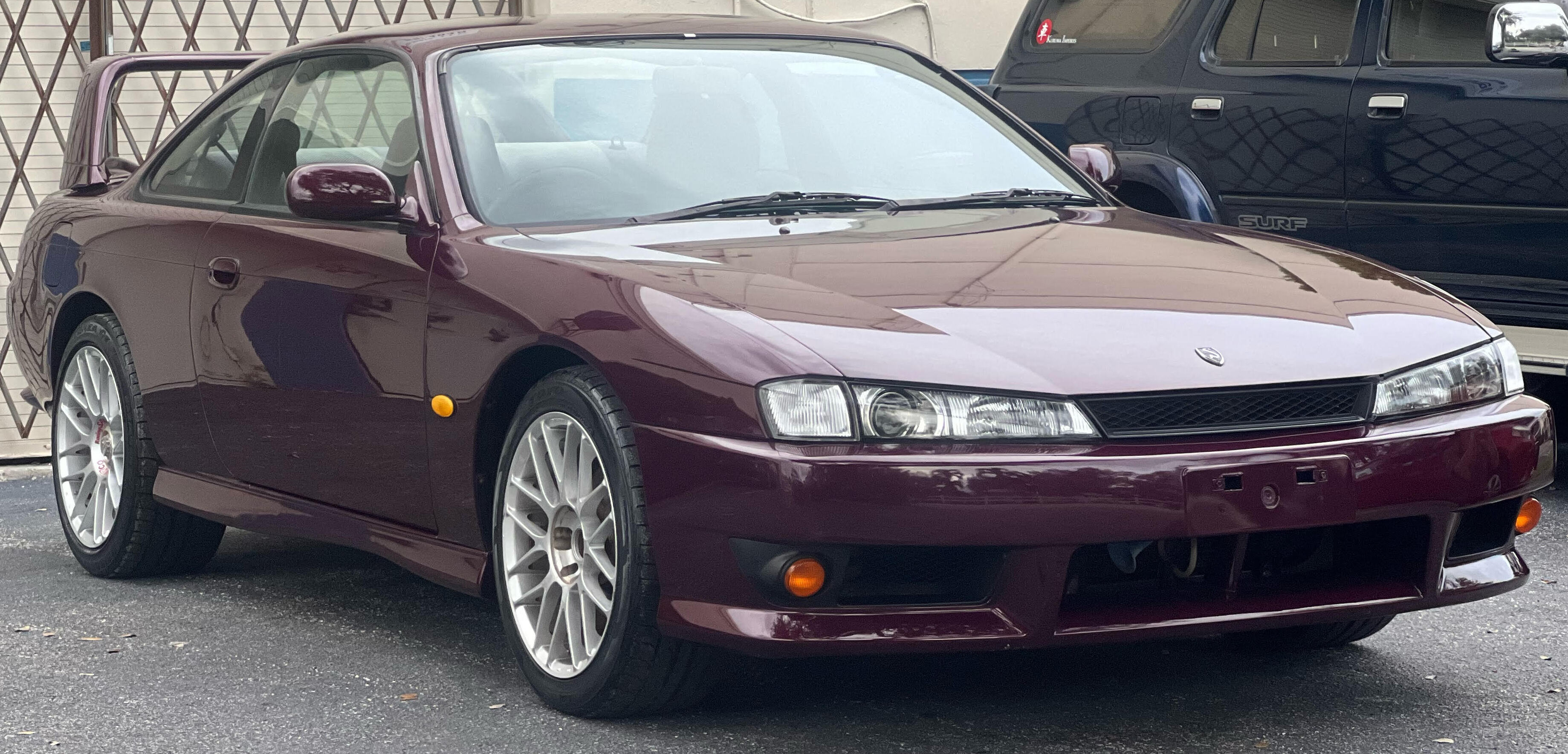
Autech Version K's MF-T

Tuning company Autech built a tuned adaption of the CS14 K's variant. It includes an Aero style HUD with white displays and gauges for oil pressure, boost, and voltage in the centre console, along with a MOMO steering wheel and leather gear knob. The interior trim is also revised.

It is powered by an Autech-tuned SR20DET that produces 182 kW (244 hp; 247 PS). An IHI ball bearing turbo (VN14) was fitted in favour of the Garrett T28 for slightly quicker response and flow. Larger 480 cc injectors found in the later S15 Spec Rs were also fitted, as well as a thicker 80 mm intercooler also found in S15s, and a higher flowing Fujitsubo Giken (FGK) exhaust. Handling improvements include multi-link suspension, firmer shocks and springs, front strut brace, and a rear sway bar. A large F40 style rear spoiler and aero bodykit with Autech indicators are also fitted. An "Autech Version K's MF-T" badge and sticker can be found on the boot.

== S15 ==
Nissan Silvia (S15)
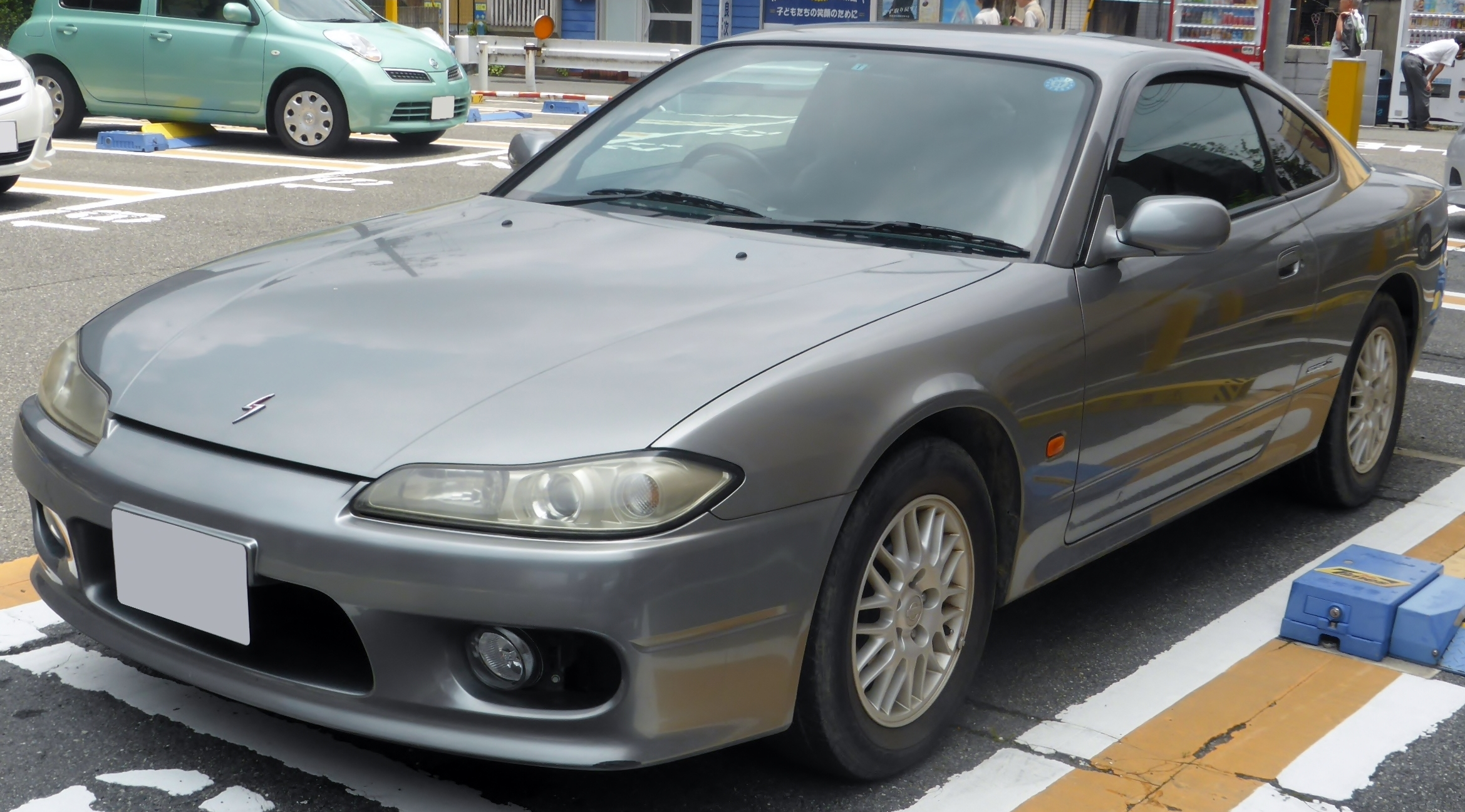
- Nissan Silvia (S15) Spec-S in Japan

Overview
- Also called: Nissan 200SX (Australia and New Zealand)
- Production: January 1999 – August 2002; 43,097 produced
- Assembly: Japan: Kanda, Fukuoka (Nissan Shatai Plant)
- Designer: Ryōji Ōtake

Body and chassis
- Body style: 2-door coupe; 2-door convertible (Silvia Varietta)
- Layout: FR layout
- Platform: Nissan S platform

Powertrain
- Engine: 2.0 L SR20DE I4; 2.0 L SR20DET I4 turbo
- Transmission: 5-speed manual; 6-speed Aisin AZ6 manual; 4-speed automatic

Dimensions
- Wheelbase: 2,525 mm (99.4 in)
- Length: 4,445 mm (175.0 in)
- Width: 1,695 mm (66.7 in)
- Height: 1,285 mm (50.6 in)
- Curb weight: 1,200–1,450 kg (2,646–3,197 lb)

In January 1999, Japan saw a new version of the Silvia, the S15, now producing 250 PS (247 bhp; 184 kW) at 6,400 rpm and 275 N⋅m; 203 lbf⋅ft (28 kg⋅m) of torque at 4,800 rpm from its SR20DET inline-four engine, thanks to a ball bearing turbocharger upgrade, as well as an improved engine management system. The non-turbo SR20DE produces 165 PS (163 bhp; 121 kW). This generation of the Silvia included aggressive styling inside and out, updating the previous Silvia styling in-line with modern car design trends. The body dimensions were reduced from the previous generation so that it would comply with Japanese Government compact class, which had an effect on sales of the previous model. It was only sold new in Japan, Indonesia, Australia and New Zealand, with the latter two being sold as the Nissan 200SX with various differences between the two markets.

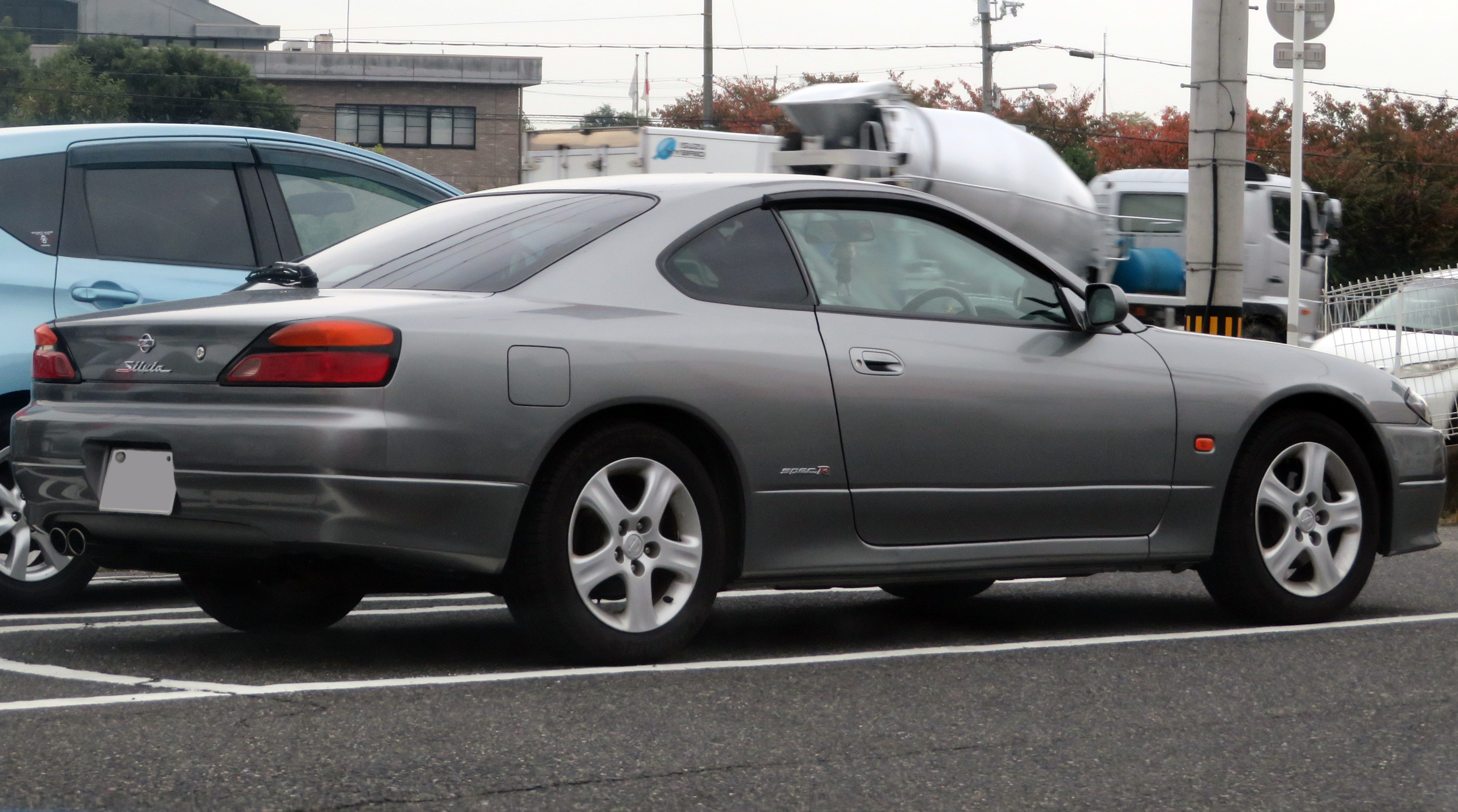
Nissan Silvia Spec-R b package (Japan)

The S15 Silvia model lineup was initially simplified to just Spec-S and Spec-R, with both models offering an "Aero" variant with a large rear wing, side skirts, valances and front bumper. The S15 line was later expanded to include various luxury and upgrade option packages for both the Spec-S and Spec-R, such as the b package luxury option package in October 1999 which featured blue suede-like fabric for the front seats and door trim (the rear seats remain the same), blue stitching on the steering wheel and a leather-wrapped shift knob, fog lamps, and chrome-like 16-inch aluminum wheels exclusively for the Spec-R b package.

Autech, a specialty car developer, also offered several tuned versions of the S15; one with body and interior trim modeled after the Ferrari 456, called the style-A, available in both Spec-S and Spec-R based trims; and a second tuned version was based on the Spec-S trim level with the engine output increased to 200 hp (149 kW) through the use of increased compression, more aggressive camshafts, and free-breathing intake and exhaust tracts to increase combustion efficiency by reducing back pressure, along with ECU tuning and upgrades to the chassis and suspension. Valve timing and lift were also tuned to achieve the desired torque characteristics. This version also included the 6-speed transmission and other upgrades normally found only in the Spec-R.

Production of the Silvia ended amidst Nissan's efforts to reduce its myriad of platforms. Nissan stopped producing the S platform in August 2002, with the S15-series Nissan Silvia being the final variant. The S15 Silvia was therefore the last car to use the Silvia name, as well as one of the last sports cars developed by Nissan to use a traditional (non-midship) FR layout. Nissan's current worldwide sports car platform is the front midship FM platform, which underpins the Z33/34 Fairlady Z (the 350/370Z outside Japan) sports car and the V35/37 Nissan Skyline (the Infiniti G35/37 in North America) luxury-sport sedan and coupé.

=== Variants ===
==== Spec-R ====
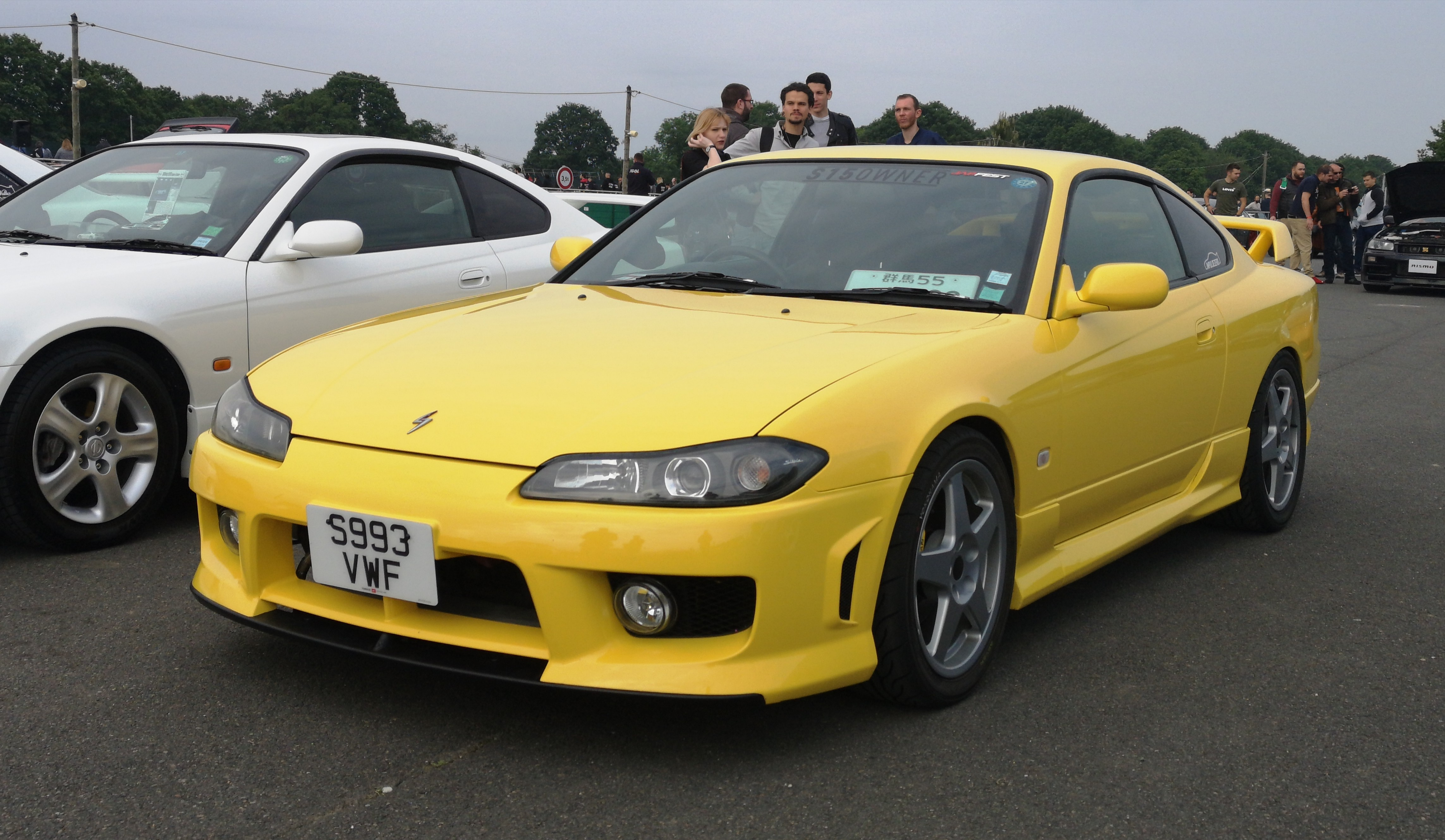
1999 Nissan Silvia Spec-R Aero

The Spec-R was fitted with a turbocharged SR20DET engine, and differed from previous Silvia models by featuring a 6-speed manual gearbox built by Aisin Seiki as well as a 4-speed automatic transmission. The Spec-R also included extensive chassis and suspension strengthening via the use of larger anti-roll bars and strut bracing. The S15 featured the same 4-piston front brake calipers that were found in the Z32 300ZX but with a larger brake booster.

One of the biggest changes to the Spec-R was the implementation of a helical limited-slip differential. The result was a safer, more track suited drive; in some contrast to its drifting heritage and subsequent media attention. All other versions of the Silvia (S14, S15 Spec S JDM) came with a viscous limited-slip differential. HICAS (High Capacity Active Steering) four-wheel steering was also available as an option.

==== Spec-S ====
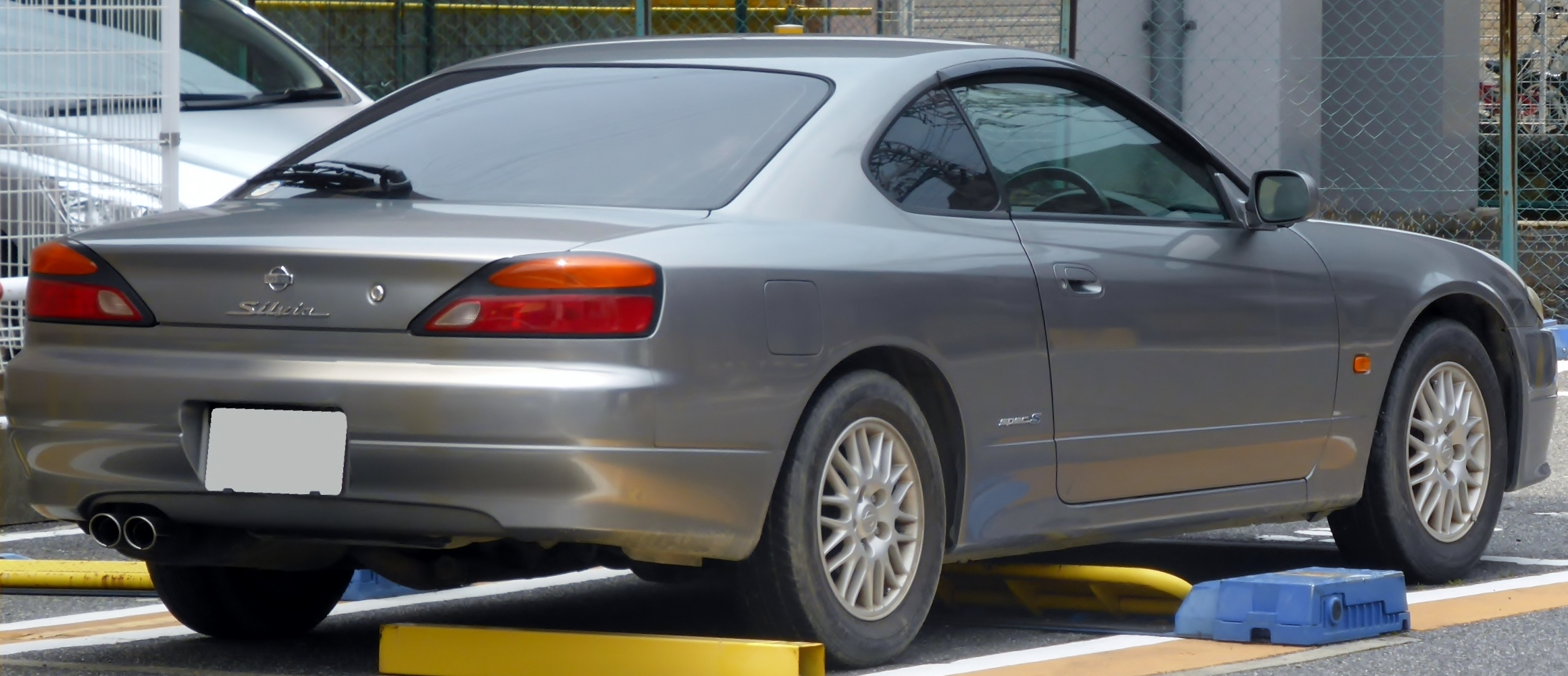
Nissan Silvia Spec S (S15, Japan)

The Spec-S was fitted with a naturally aspirated SR20DE engine, and featured a 5-speed manual transmission (in addition to a 4-speed automatic available on both the Spec-S and the Spec-R). It lacked the additional chassis support of the Spec-R, featured 2-piston front brake calipers and a slightly smaller brake booster. The Spec-S came only with an open differential with an optional viscous LSD.

==== Silvia Varietta ====
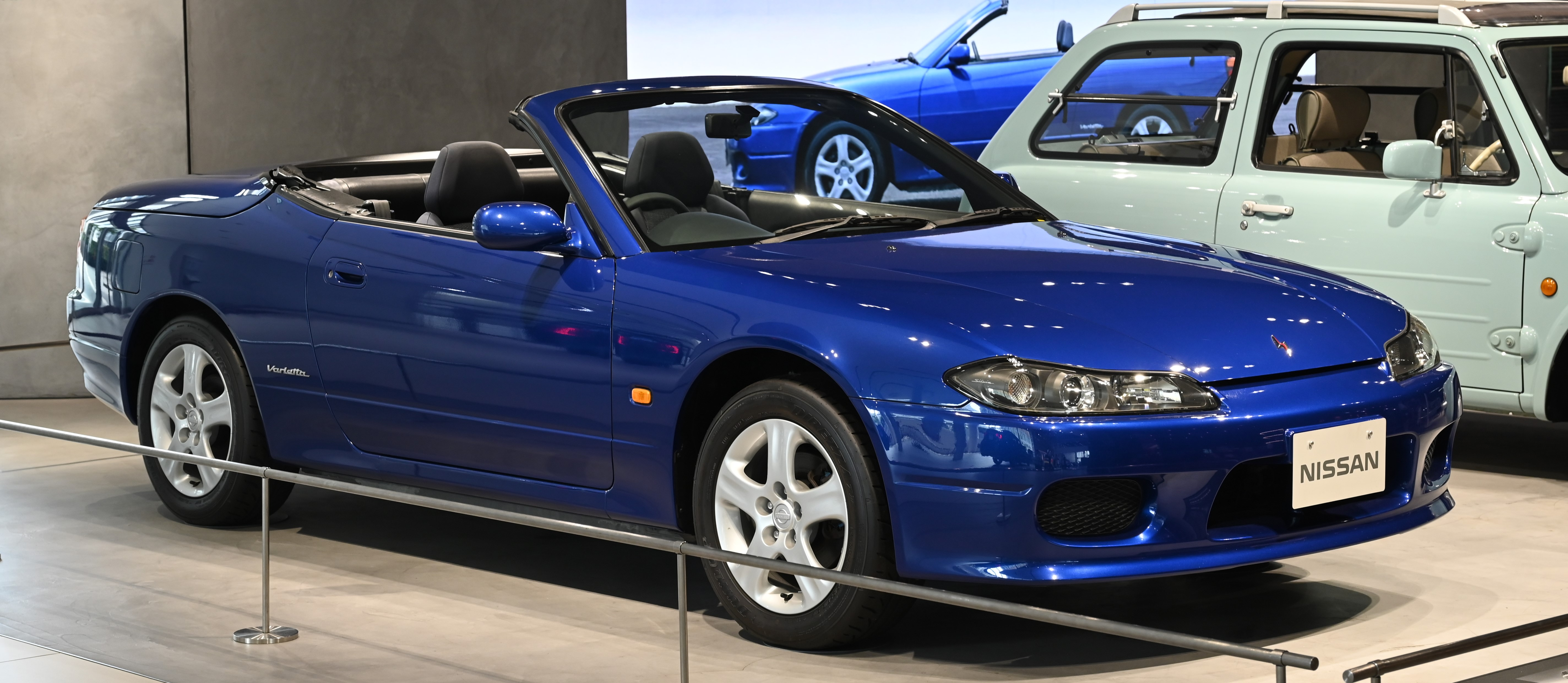
Nissan Silvia Varietta (S15, Japan)

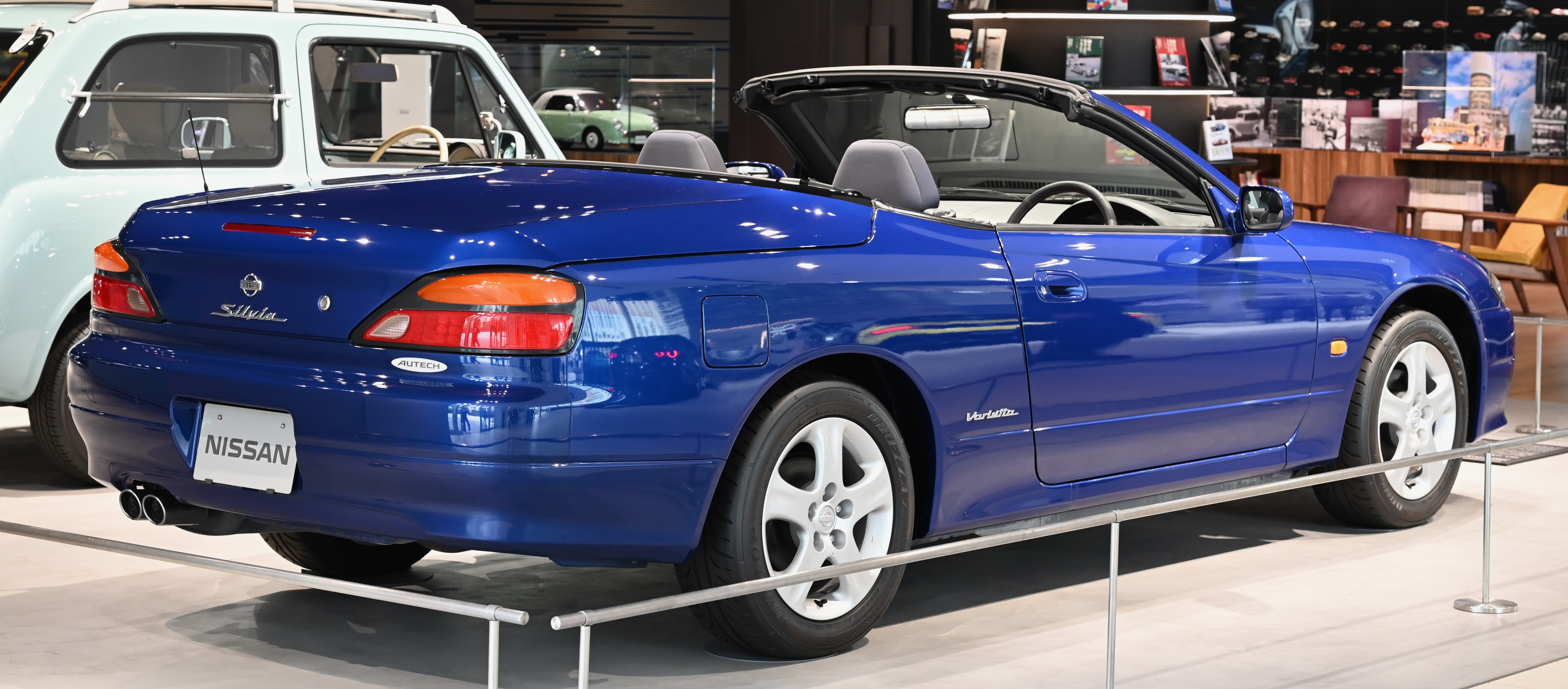
Nissan Silvia Varietta rear (S15, Japan)

In Japan, Nissan offered a retractable hardtop variant of the Silvia, called the Varietta. The Varietta was built by Autech and was based on the Spec-S model, featuring the same naturally aspirated engine, with a choice of the 5-speed manual transmission or the 4-speed automatic transmission. Only 1143 cars were produced.

==== New Le-Seyde ====
Mitsuoka produced an updated version of their Mitsuoka Le-Seyde (also known as the New Le-Seyde) based on the S15 Silvia, built in limited quantities in 2000. As with the original Le-Seyde, it used the S15 Silvia's centre portion, engine, and underpinnings.

=== Export markets ===
Unlike previous generations, the S15 Silvia was only officially available in Indonesia, Australia and New Zealand. with the latter two being exported as the 200SX with the two regions having differences between each other. With the exception of the 200SX branding, these models retained the Silvia name on some areas of the cars. Excluding Indonesia, most export models never came with the option of a naturally aspirated SR20DE in those regions (especially with the Australian-spec Spec-S model, which uses the turbocharged SR20DET instead).

The S15 Silvia has also been made available as a grey import in other countries, including the United Kingdom, Sweden, France, the United States, Singapore, Thailand and Malaysia.

==== New Zealand ====
New Zealand first received the S15 Silvia in May 1999, provided by Nissan by importing the models from Japan and then having them modified by New Zealand vehicle dealerships to meet New Zealand road requirements so that they can be sold in that region. These include an antenna on the rear right quarter panel, an optional 2-spoke spoiler, the removal of the Silvia badge on the boot lid and its replacement with a 200SX badge on the rear bumper, as well as a New Zealand-spec brochure. To comply with New Zealand's road regulations, the New Zealand S15s had a "JN1" VIN on a metal plaque, placed over the original JDM one ("S15-XXXXXX") on the firewall. All models came in the Spec-R trim including the turbocharged SR20DET engine.

In total, 477 200SXs were sold in New Zealand from July 1997 to August 2002, which also included S14 models. The first few 40+ 200SXs made between May 1999 to July 1999 (which were S15 models) are excluded from Nissan's official databases; the reasons for these exclusions are unknown.

==== Australia ====
Nissan 200SX Spec-R in Australia

Australia received the S15 Silvia after New Zealand in October 2000. They were imported separately from the manufacturer by local importers without Nissan's involvement (as the company did not provide the models directly to the region unlike the ones in New Zealand) and then modified to different specs from the factory so that they could be sold in the region. Initially offered in the same trim levels as the Japanese version (Spec-S and Spec-R), a limited edition "GT" version for both the Spec-S and Spec-R models was offered at the end of 200SX production for that region.

All models (including the Spec-S models) came with the turbocharged SR20DET engine, which was de-tuned to meet Australian fuel regulations; power outputs decreased from 247 bhp (184 kW; 250 PS) to 197 bhp (147 kW; 200 PS) at 6,400 rpm and 275 N⋅m; 203 lbf⋅ft (28 kg⋅m) to 218 N⋅m; 161 lbf⋅ft (22.2 kg⋅m) of torque at 4,800 rpm. The Australian market Spec-S differed from the Japanese market Spec-S in that it came with the same helical LSD, chassis bracing and 6-speed manual transmission as found on the Japanese market Spec-R.

To reduce manufacturing costs, the 200SX received some changes carried over from the Japanese models such as the removal of the rear window wiper, sun-visor mirrors, A-pillar boost gauge, auto-climate control and electric folding mirrors. The Spec-R also offered a factory sunroof that was not available on the Spec-S. The original steering wheel was replaced with the one taken from the R34 Skyline 25GT Turbo (GT-T) and a 260 km/h speedometer was used in place of the original 180 km/h one from the Japanese models. A 200SX badge replaces the original Silvia badge on the boot lid (unlike the New Zealand models, where the badge is placed on the rear bumper instead). All cars featured a unique 17-digit VIN instead of the original Japanese one ("S15-XXXXXX") to comply with Australia's road regulations.

The GT models offered at the final year of production had the "L Package" interior and the "Aero" wing found in the Japanese models, and received darker colour wheels finished in a silver shadow chrome. The GT badges were taken from the Skyline GT-R and are located on the fenders. Additionally, chrome interior door handles, chrome gear selector surround and "sports" metal pedal sets were standard on the GT.

In total, 3,879 200SXs for Australia were produced, making up just over 10 percent of S15 production from 1999 to 2002.

==== Indonesia ====
The Silvia was imported in very small numbers by Nissan Motor Indonesia, which had the same specifications as the Japanese models. It was only available in the Spec-S trim with the SR20DE engine mated to a 4-speed automatic transmission.

== Revival ==
On 5 September 2024, an interview from the Australian "Drive." magazine, Nissan Vice-President Global Product Strategy "Ivan Espinosa" confirmed a new third sports car in the works slotted below the Z and the GT-R and will revive the Silvia name. It is unclear whether if the next generation of the vehicle will be fully electric (EV) or will use a hybrid system, as the project is still at its infancy and has yet to have any product confirmation.

== Motorsports ==
=== Rallying ===
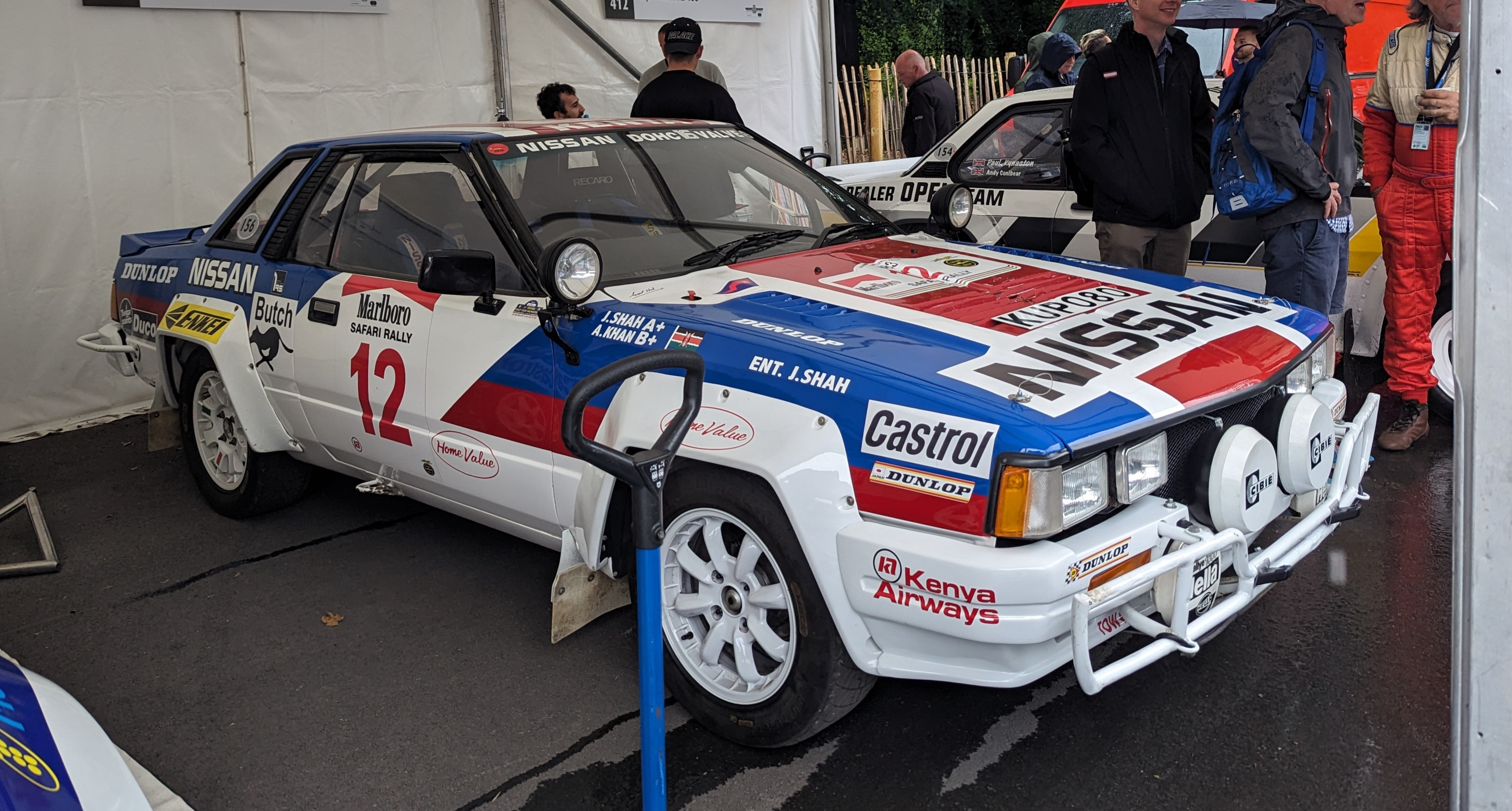
Nissan 240RS 1983 Safari Rally

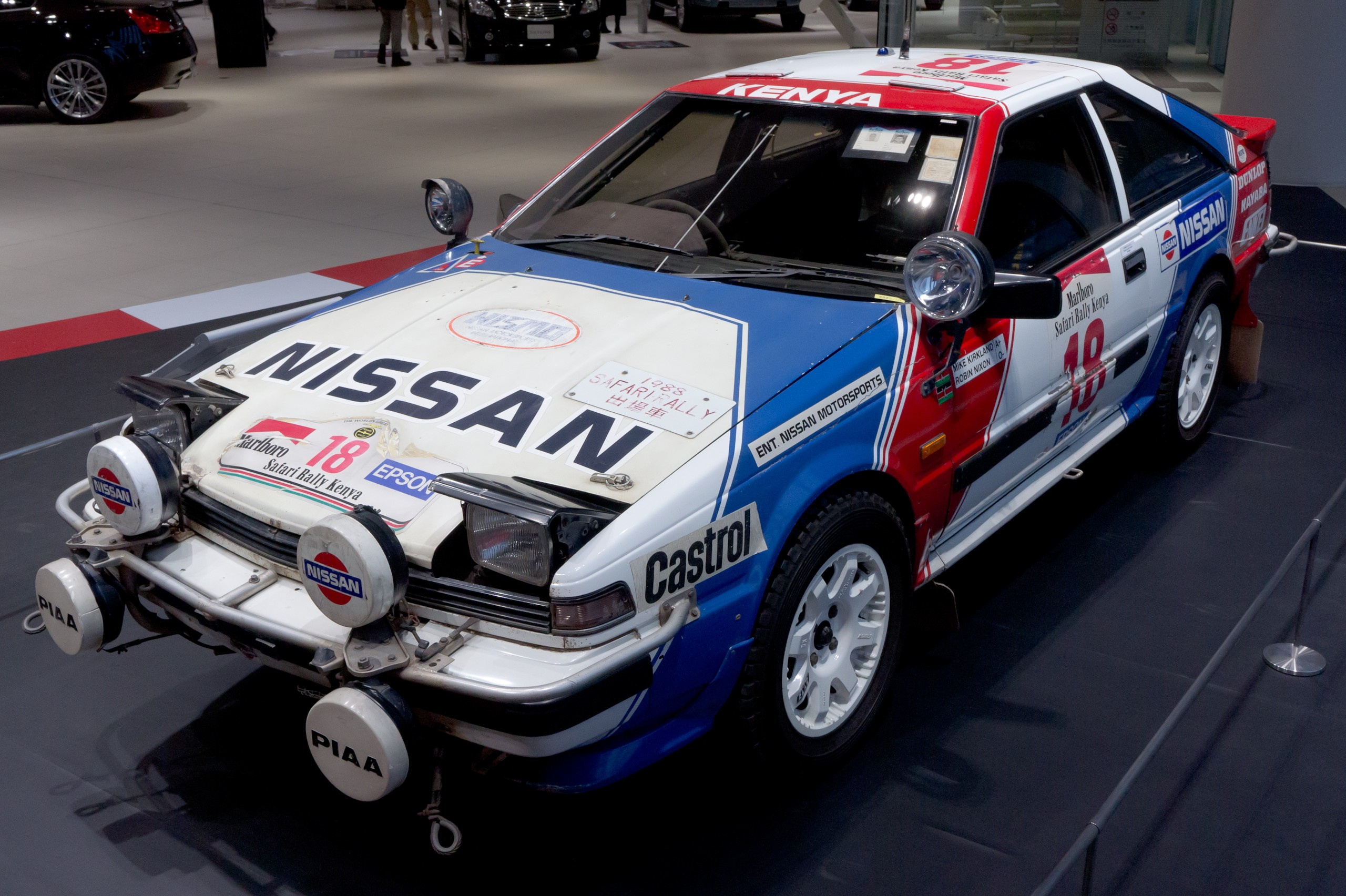
Nissan Silvia 200SX 1988 Safari Rally runner-up car

The Silvia 240RS was the official car entered by Nissan in the 1983-1985 WRC. The rally drivers were Timo Salonen, Shekhar Mehta, and Mike Kirkland. The 240RS achieved few podiums, but did not win any WRC event and could not match the more powerful Group B rally cars like Audi Quattro, Lancia 037, Peugeot 205 Turbo 16, and Toyota Celica Twincam Turbo.

The elimination of Group B from the WRC signified the end of Nissan's FJ24-powered 240RS. The FJ20ET-powered Silvia RS-X of 1986 would have been Nissan's first choice – however, not enough examples of this Japan-only model were sold to meet the WRC's Homologation requirements (minimum 5000 units). Therefore, Nissan had to quickly find a car to replace the 240RS.

The 1987 200SX SE V6 was chosen and competed on the global stage from 1986 through 1989 as a 200SX. The V6-engined SE was only sold in the North American market but was selected as Nissan projected to easily sell the 5000 cars required for WRC homologation. The V6 was an unusual choice as the WRC was dominated by four-cylinder, 2.0-liter turbocharged engines – although Toyota entered WRC with the six-cylinder Supra at the same time, for similar reasons. The 200SX best finish was a first place in the 1988 Rallye Côte d'Ivoire. The 200SX also reached second place for two years running in the very challenging Safari Rally, in 1988 and 1989.

=== Circuit Racing ===
Mark Skaife won the 1987 Australian 2.0 Litre Touring Car Championship driving a Nissan Gazelle entered by the Nissan Motor Company.

The Silvia S12 competed in the JSS (Japan Supersports Series) throughout the 1980s, when many of the top tuners got their start. They featured 15"x10"J wheels under the "Fisco" wide body kit. The JSS S12's made between 280PS to 340PS from the FJ20ET and CA18DET from 1987. The "HKS World Trade Silvia" sponsored and engineered by tuners HKS and Tomei ran in this series.

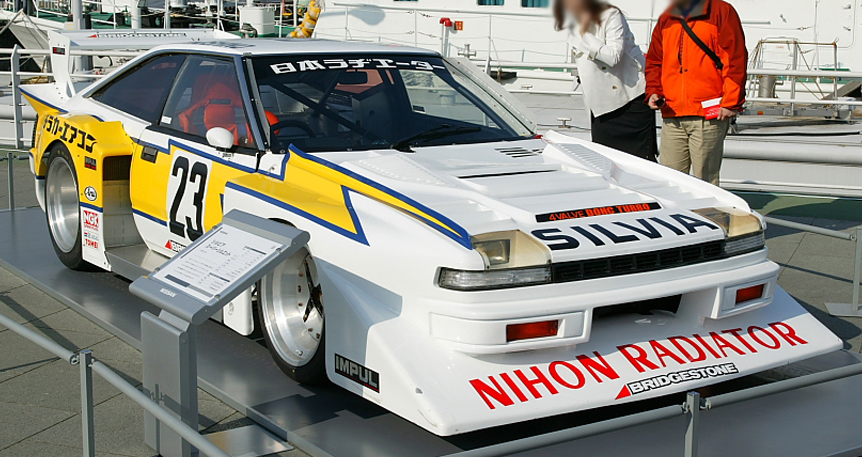
Nissan Silvia Super Silhouette

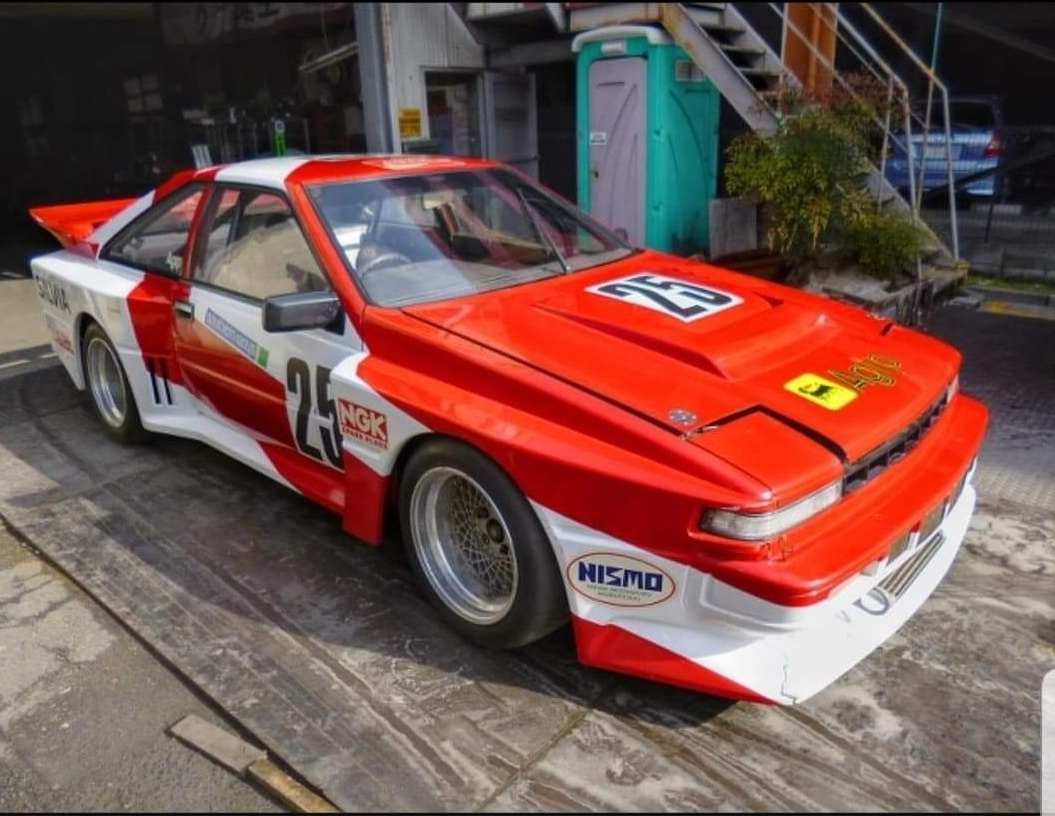
Nissan Silvia S12 JSS HKS Fisco widebody

Silvias were raced successfully in the All-Japan GT Championship (now Super GT) and its predecessors. The S14 and S15 generations of the Silvia won the GT300 class championship in 1997 and 2001, respectively. During the S13's production, there was a one-make series in Japan. The S13s were also successful in racing in the IMSA GTU class during the 1990s.

The Silvia S15 of Under Suzuki has dominated the Tsukuba circuit lap time record for some time. After it defeated the HKS CT230R LanEvo for the record in 2012, Under Suzuki's S15 has been resetting Tsukuba's lap time record. The latest lap record is currently timed at 50.366s, even faster than an official JGTC race car ARTA NSX.

=== Drifting ===
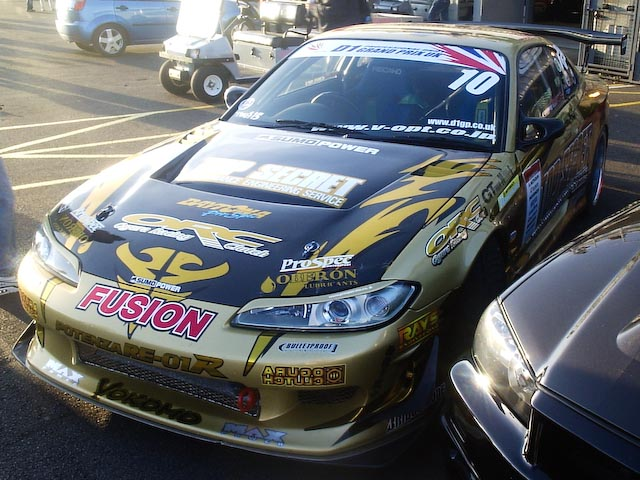
S15 Silvia of 2004 D1GP champion Ryuji Miki

The S-chassis is a popular drift car and time attack car, especially the S13 through S15 vehicles. This is due to the extreme versatility and huge aftermarket for the S-chassis; many professional racing cars have been built with off-the-shelf suspension and engine components. The car has enjoyed success, having won 11 D1 Grand Prix championships with 8 different drivers driving the S15 (Nobuteru Taniguchi: 2001; Ryuji Miki: 2004; Yasuyuki Kazama: 2005; Masato Kawabata: 2007; Youichi Imamura: 2009, 2010, 2011; Masashi Yokoi: 2018, 2019; Masanori Kohashi: 2020; Naoki Nakamura: 2021). Odi Bakchis, a pro-level drifter from USA who started drifting in 2011, has an S14 that races in Formula Drift, finishing third in the Formula Drift USA Championship. He has multiple event wins and has placed in the top five overall in Formula Drift for the past 4 years. In 2017, 2018 and 2019 Formula Drift driver James Deane campaigned and won the PRO championship in the Worthouse Drift Team S15.

In Europe, the S13 has also been very popular with pro-level drifters, especially in countries like the United Kingdom, Poland, France, Germany, Sweden, Norway, Russia and Ukraine. While some have opted to keep the SR20DET engine, most drivers swap this for the more powerful RB25DET and RB26DETT unit from the Nissan Skyline and Skyline GT-R, or even the 2JZ-GTE engine from the A80 Toyota Supra like Pawel Trela from Poland.
