= 2024 Drift Masters season =

Auto racing season

The 2024 Drift Masters season was the tenth full season of the Drift Masters series. The season began on May 11 at Circuit Ricardo Tormo and concluded on September 14 at PGE Narodowy custom built track after six events.

Lauri Heinonen, driving his Nissan 180SX, won his first-ever Championship.

Ireland won their 3rd Nations Cup in a row and 5th overall.

Conor Falvey won the Rookie of the Year award finishing 17th overall.

== Entries ==
No.	Car	Driver	Rounds
5	BMW E36	(United States) Adam LZ	2–6
29	Toyota GT86	(Poland) Adam Zalewski	All
738	BMW M2	(Ukraine) Alex Holovnia	All
71	Toyota GT86	(Kuwait) Ali Makhseed	1
93	BMW E92	(Lithuania) Benediktas Cirba	All
96	Nissan S14A	(Netherlands) Clint van Oort	All
412	Nissan S15	(Republic of Ireland) Conor Falvey	All
79	Toyota GT86	(Republic of Ireland) Conor Shanahan	All
56	Nissan S15	(Poland) Dawid Sposób	All
111	BMW E92	(Portugal) Diogo Correia	All
25	Nissan 180SX	(Republic of Ireland) Duane McKeever	All
113	BMW F22 Eurofighter	(Latvia) Edgars Kroģeris	All
88	Toyota GT86	(Republic of Ireland) Fionn Roche	All
95	BMW E46	(Israel) Itay Sadeh	All
59	Toyota GT86	(Republic of Ireland) Jack Shanahan	All
225	Nissan S14.9	(Poland) Jakub Król	All
86	Toyota GR86	(Poland) Jakub Przygoński	All
130	Nissan S14	(Republic of Ireland) James Deane	2–6
41	Nissan S14.5	(Sweden) Joakim Andersson	All
33	Toyota GR Supra	(Switzerland) Joshua Reynolds	All
13	Chevrolet Corvette C6	(Canada) Josiah Fallaise	All
89	BMW E92 M3	(Finland) Juha Pöytälaakso	All
200	Toyota GR86	(Finland) Juha Rintanen	All
11	BMW M2	(Estonia) Kevin Pesur	All
300	BMW E92	(Hungary) Kevin Piskolty	All
18	Nissan 180SX	(Finland) Lauri Heinonen	All
19	BMW E36/BMW E92	(Italy) Manuel Vacca	All
55	BMW F22 M2	(Czech Republic) Marco Zakouril	1, 3, 5–6
84	Nissan S13.5	(Germany) Max Heidrich	All
850	BMW E92 M3	(Czech Republic) Michal Reichert	All
46	BMW F22	(Finland) Mikka Keski-Korpi	All
94	Nissan S13	(El Salvador) (United Arab Emirates) Nasser Alharbali	All
129	BMW E36	(Latvia) Nikolass Bertans	1
36	BMW E46	(Estonia) Oliver Randalu	All
12	Toyota Soarer	(Norway) Orjan Nilsen	All
74	Nissan S14A	(Poland) Paweł Korpuliński	All
78	Nissan S15	(Poland) Piotr Kozłowski	All
215	Toyota GR Supra	(Poland) Piotr Więcek	All
77	BMW E46	(Sweden) Pontus Hartman	All
69	Nissan S15	(Japan) Ryusei Akiba	All
320	Mercedes Benz S203.5	(Finland) Teemu Peltola	All
498	Nissan 200SX S13	(Norway) Tor Arne Kvia	All
91	Toyota GR Supra	(Switzerland) Yves Meyer	All

James Deane initially planned to compete only in selected rounds as a wildcard, but was later added as a full-time driver.

== Schedule ==
Round	Circuit	Location	Date	Qualifying winner	Qualifying showdown winner	Winner	Car
1	Circuit Ricardo Tormo	Valencia, Spain	10–12 May	(Kuwait) Ali Makhseed	(Kuwait) Ali Makhseed	(Estonia) Kevin Pesur	BMW E46 M2
2	Mondello Park	(Republic of Ireland) Kildare, Ireland	15–16 June	(Republic of Ireland) James Deane	(Republic of Ireland) James Deane	(Republic of Ireland) James Deane	Nissan S14.9
3	PowerPark Huvivaltio	Alahärmä, Finland	5–6 July	(Republic of Ireland) Conor Shanahan	(Finland) Lauri Heinonen	(Finland) Lauri Heinonen	Nissan 180SX
4	Bikernieku Trase	Riga, Latvia	2–3 August	(Poland) Piotr Więcek	(Republic of Ireland) James Deane	(Republic of Ireland) Conor Shanahan	Toyota GT86
5	Rabocsiring Máriapócs	Máriapócs, Hungary	23–25 August	(Poland) Piotr Więcek	(Poland) Piotr Więcek	(Finland) Lauri Heinonen	Nissan 180SX
6	PGE Narodowy	Warsaw, Poland	13–14 September	(Republic of Ireland) Duane McKeever	(Republic of Ireland) Duane McKeever	(Republic of Ireland) Duane McKeever	Nissan 180SX

A map showing the locations of the rounds in the 2024 championship. Circuits are marked with black dots.

=== Schedule changes ===
- The championship went to Spain for the first time in its history. The round took place on Circuit Ricardo Tormo in Valencia.
- After getting removed from the calendar in 2018 after just one event, Rabocsiring Máriapócs returned to the calendar.
- Due to disagreements about ticket prices, Ferropolis was removed from the calendar.
- The Swedish round taking place at Drivecenter Arena was removed from the calendar.

== Wildcards ==
=== Round 1 ===
No.	Car	Driver
201	BMW E92	(Ukraine) Igor Derenko
209	Subaru BRZ	(France) Jason Banet
204	Nissan S13	(Spain) Joan Caballer
205	BMW E46	(Portugal) Joao Vieira
202	Nissan Skyline R33	(Spain) Marc Huertes
208	BMW E82	(Norway) Ole Peter Vatn
206	BMW E92	(Spain) Òscar Ruiz Trave
203	BMW E36	(Spain) Ruben Bolaños
207	Toyota GT86	(United Kingdom) Steve Biagioni

=== Round 2 ===
No.	Car	Driver
900	Nissan S13	(Republic of Ireland) Tomás Kiely
901	Nissan S14A	(United Kingdom) Steven McConnell
902	BMW E36	(Spain) Ruben Bolaños
903	Nissan S15	(Republic of Ireland) Kevin Quinn
904	BMW E92	(Sweden) Victor Joensuu
905	Nissan S14A	(Republic of Ireland) Chris Brady
204	Nissan S14	(Republic of Ireland) Alan Hynes
130	Nissan S14	(Republic of Ireland) James Deane
207	Toyota GT86	(United Kingdom) Steve Biagioni

=== Round 3 ===
No.	Car	Driver
907	Nissan 350Z	(Finland) Niklas Wik
908	Nissan S15	(Finland) Niklas Määttälä
909	BMW E92	(Poland) Tobiasz Puścian
910	BMW E36 M3	(Finland) Kristiina Aalto
911	BMW E92 M3	(Finland) Toni Ojatalo
912	Mercedes Benz CLK	(Sweden) Mårten Stångberg
913	Volvo 745	(Sweden) Kevin Brunberg
914	Toyota Chaser	(Finland) Jarkko Jylhä
915	Nissan S14 200SX	(Finland) Ville Kaukonen
130	Nissan S14	(Republic of Ireland) James Deane

=== Round 4 ===
No.	Car	Driver
921	BMW E36	(Latvia) Aleksandrs Vlasovs
918	Nissan 200SX	(Ukraine) Dmitriy Illyuk
914	Toyota Chaser	(Finland) Jarkko Jylhä
920	Nissan 350Z	(Estonia) Karel Piiroja
917	BMW E92 Eurofighter	(Latvia) Kristaps Bluss
916	Nissan S14.5	(Latvia) Rolands Berzins
919	BMW E36	(Lithuania) Sandra Janušauskaitė
900	Nissan S13	(Republic of Ireland) Tomás Kiely

=== Round 5 ===
No.	Car	Driver
930	BMW E82	(Cyprus) George Christoforou
922	Mazda RX7	(Italy) Luca Fuschini
928	Nissan S15	(Turkey) Enver Haskasap
918	Nissan 200SX	(Ukraine) Dmitriy Illyuk
929	BMW E46	(Romania) Natalia Iocsak
927	Nissan S15	(Thailand) Thanupat Lerttaweevit
923	BMW E92	(Hungary) Robert Petri
699	Toyota Supra A90	(Finland) Kalle Rovanperä
910	BMW E36 M3	(Finland) Kristiina Aalto
313	Toyota GT86	(United Kingdom) Steve Biagioni

=== Round 6 ===
No.	Car	Driver
935	BMW E46	(Poland) Sebastian Kraszewski
932	Nissan S14	(Poland) Łukasz Tasiemski
934	Toyota GR Supra	(Poland) Mateusz Suski
931	Nissan S15	(Poland) Karolina Pilarczyk
123	Mazda RX7	(New Zealand) Mike Whiddett
933	BMW E92	(Poland) Bartosz Ostałowski
936	BMW F22	(Germany) Elias Hountondji
937	Nissan S15	(Poland) Bartosz Stolarski
927	Nissan S15	(Thailand) Thanupat Lerttaweevit
902	BMW E36	(Spain) Ruben Bolaños

== Championship standings ==
=== Qualifying stage ===
Position	**1st**	**2nd**	**3rd**	**4th**	**5th**	**6th**	**7th**	**8th**
Qualifying points	**8**	**7**	**6**	**5**	**4**	**3**	**2**	**1**
Qualifying showdown points	**4**	**3**	**2**	**1**	–			

=== Competition stage ===
Position	**1st**	**2nd**	**3rd**	**4th**	**5th–8th**	**9th–16th**	**17th–32nd**
Points	100	88	76	64	48	32	16

=== Drivers standings ===
Pos.	Driver	(Spain) R1	(Republic of Ireland) R2	(Finland) R3	(Latvia) R4	(Hungary) R5	(Poland) R6	Points
1	(Finland) Lauri Heinonen	2^{3 3}	10^{3 3}	1^{3 1}	10^{2 4}	1^{8}	5^{7}	437
2	(Republic of Ireland) Duane McKeever	12	2^{6}	2^{8}	4^{4 2}	22	**1^{1 1}**	412
3	(Republic of Ireland) James Deane		**1^{1 1}**	3^{7}	2^{3 1}	17^{3 3}	2^{3 2}	409
4	(Republic of Ireland) Conor Shanahan	34	11^{4 4}	**5^{1 3}**	1^{8}	6	7	293
5	(Poland) Paweł Korpuliński	18^{8}	8	21	3	3	13	265
6	(Estonia) Kevin Pesur	1	19	6	15	16	17^{4 4}	250
7	(Hungary) Kevin Piskolty	5^{6}	15	18^{6}	14	4	6	246
8	(Republic of Ireland) Jack Shanahan	25	5	4^{5}	18	7	14	228
9	(Norway) Tor Arne Kvia	27	20	11	13	2	9^{2 3}	225
10	(Lithuania) Benediktas Cirba	4^{2 2}	26	7	32	12^{5}	10	222
11	(Norway) Orjan Nilsen	10^{5}	3^{7}	17^{4 2}	11^{6}	23	11	221
12	(Poland) Piotr Więcek	17^{4 4}	12^{8}	41	**9^{1 3}**	**9^{1 1}**	4^{5}	209
13	(Poland) Adam Zalewski	3	25	22	12	15	28	188
14	(Finland) Juha Rintanen	29	4	20	29	14	12	176
15	(Estonia) Oliver Randalu	15	7	32	23	29	8	176
16	(Finland) Mika Keski-Korpi	14	14	15	8	24	24	176
17	(Republic of Ireland) Conor Falvey	42	17^{5}	16	5^{5}	8	26	168
18	(Poland) Jakub Król	7	6	23	20	19	20	160
19	(Israel) Itay Sadeh	37	24	27	6	5	30	144
20	(United States) Adam LZ		44	13	21	21	3	140
21	(Poland) Jakub Przygoński	19	9^{2 2}	19	17^{7}	10^{2 2}	49	134
22	(Netherlands) Clint van Oort	6^{7}	30	28	46	18^{6}	18^{6}	120
23	(Finland) Juha Pöytälaakso	24	33	9^{2 4}	25	28	16	120
24	(Poland) Dawid Sposób	8	21	38	31	32	31	112
25	(Czech Republic) Marco Zakouril	20		12	DNC	13^{7}	19^{8}	99
26	(Sweden) Pontus Hartman	21	32	8	36	25	33	96
27	(Germany) Max Heidrich	16	16	36	34	27	21	96
28	(Sweden) Joakim Andersson	23	18	29	24	26	23	96
29	(Ukraine) Alex Holovnia	11	31	24	22	33	35	80
30	(Finland) Teemu Peltola	DNC	27	25	38	31	15	80
31	(Republic of Ireland) Tomás Kiely		29		7			64
32	(Portugal) Diogo Correia	26	28	10	35	DNC	34	64
33	(Republic of Ireland) Fionn Roche	28	13	34	27	DNC	42	64
34	(Finland) Jarkko Jylhä			14	16			64
35	(Czech Republic) Michal Reichert	22	42	30	19	49	48	48
36	(United Kingdom) Steve Biagioni	36	22			20	32	48
37	(Switzerland) Yves Meyer	31	48	26	26	43	36	48
38	(Canada) Josiah Fallaise	DNC	40	31	30	35	27	48
39	(Kuwait) Ali Makhseed	**9^{1 1}**						44
40	(Finland) Kalle Rovanperä					11^{4 4}		38
41	(France) Jason Banet	13						32
42	(El Salvador) (United Arab Emirates) Nasser Alharbali	42	41	43	28	37	25	32
43	(Japan) Ryusei Akiba	41	35	40	39	41	22	16
44	(Republic of Ireland) Kevin Quinn		23					16
45	(Poland) Łukasz Tasiemski						29	16
46	(Latvia) Edgars Kroģeris	30	39	45	33	47	37	16
47	(Italy) Luca Fuschini					30		16
48	(Italy) Manuel Vacca	32	38	33	37	38	40	16
NC	(Poland) Piotr Kozłowski	35	47	42	44	36	47	0
NC	(Switzerland) Joshua Reynolds	47	43	39	45	44	46	0
NC	(Latvia) Nikolass Bertans	40						0

In-line notation
Blank	Didn't participate
	Place in qualifying (Did not qualify)
^{Superscript number 1}	Place in qualifying (Top 8)
^{Superscript number 2}	Place in qualifying showdown
**Bold**	Top qualifier
DNC	(Did Not Compete) Showed up at the event but wasn't able to run any qualification laps due to issues

=== Nations Cup standings ===
From 2024 season Nation Cup points are awarded each round to the two drivers with the highest classified finish for each nation.

Pos	Nation	(Spain) R1	(Republic of Ireland) R2	(Finland) R3	(Latvia) R4	(Hungary) R5	(Poland) R6	Points
1	(Republic of Ireland) Ireland	12	1	2	1	6	1	992
1	(Republic of Ireland) Ireland	25	2	3	2	7	2	992
2	Finland	2	4	1	8	1	5	691
2	Finland	14	10	9	10	11	12	691
3	Poland	3	6	19	3	3	4	590
3	Poland	7	8	21	9	9	13	590
4	Norway	10	3	11	11	2	9	446
4	Norway	17	20	17	13	23	11	446
5	Estonia	1	7	6	15	16	8	426
5	Estonia	15	19	32	23	29	17	426
6	Hungary	5	15	18	14	4	6	246
6	Hungary					39		246
7	Lithuania	4	26	7	32	12	10	222
7	Lithuania				40			222
8	Sweden	21	18	8	24	25	23	192
8	Sweden	23	32	29	36	26	33	192
9	Czech Republic	20	42	12	19	13	19	147
9	Czech Republic	22		30		49	48	147
10	Israel	37	24	27	6	5	30	144
11	United States of America		44	13	21	21	3	140
12	Netherlands	6	30	28	46	18	18	120
13	Germany	16	16	36	34	27	21	96
13	Germany						39	96
14	Ukraine	11	31	24	22	33	35	80
14	Ukraine	42				45		80
15	Portugal	26	28	10	35	DNC	34	64
15	Portugal	42						64
16	United Kingdom	36	22			20	32	48
16	United Kingdom		45					48
17	Switzerland	31	43	26	26	43	36	48
17	Switzerland	42	48	39	45	44	46	48
18	Canada		40	31	30	35	27	48
19	Kuwait	9						44
20	France	13						32
21	El Salvador	42	41	43	28	37	25	32
22	Italy	32	39	33	37	30	40	32
22	Italy					38		32
23	Japan	42	41	43	28	37	22	16
24	Latvia	30	39	45	33	47	37	16
24	Latvia	40			41			16
