= 2009 European Drift Championship season =

2009 European Drift Championship

Seasons
- ← 2008 2010 →

The 2009 European Drift Championship season is the third season of the European Drift Championship. The championship was won by Mark Luney after he narrow snatched the title from the then championship leader, Phil Morrison.

== 2009 entry list ==
2009 Need For Speed European Drift Championship Driver	Car	Number	Team/ Major Sponsor	Country
Ben Broke-Smith	Nissan Skyline R32	1	Driftworks/Federal Tyres	(United Kingdom)
Brett Castle	Nissan 200sx S14a	3	Sampson Vehicle Services	(United Kingdom)
Mark Luney	Nissan 350z	4	SVA Imports	(Northern Ireland)
Danny Eyles	Nissan Silvia S15	5	Japspeed/Maxxis Tyres	(United Kingdom)
James Grimsey	Nissan 180sx	7	GBH Motorsport	(United Kingdom)
Alan McCord	Nissan Silvia S15 (V8 Powered)	8	Hi-Octane Imports/McKeever Spares	(Northern Ireland)
Declan Hicks	Toyota Soarer	9	Universal Turbos/RWD Japan/Maxxis Tyres	(United Kingdom)
Phil Morrison	Nissan Silvia S15 (2JZ Powered)	10	Driftworks/Federal Tyres	(United Kingdom)
James Russell	Nissan Skyline R32	12	Distinctive Cars York	(United Kingdom)
Pete Barber	Mazda RX7 FD3S	16	Swinton Car Insurance/Hayward Rotary	(United Kingdom)
Paul Conlan	Nissan Silvia S15 (2JZ Powered)	19	P&F Salvage/McKeever Spares	(Northern Ireland)
Stephen Evans	Toyota Starlet/Lexus IS200 (V8 powered)	20	Sampson Vehicle Services/Autoglym	(United Kingdom)
Kieran Cameron	Nissan Silvia S13	22	Apex Performance	(United Kingdom)
Steve Will	BMW M3 E36	29	RWDMotorsport.com	(United Kingdom)
Paul Cheshire	Nissan 200SX S14a	30	Team Green	(United Kingdom)
Alexis Drew	Nissan Skyline R32	31	Santa Pod Raceway	(United Kingdom)
Andy Cooper	Nissan 200SX S14a	33	Really Mean Sounds.com	(Northern Ireland)
Gary Hughes	Nissan Skyline R32	34	Skyline Owners	(United Kingdom)
Ian Harrison	Nissan Skyline R32	38	Harrison Motorsport	(United Kingdom)
Robin Neeson	Toyota Chaser	39	Smith's Engineering	(Northern Ireland)
Duane McKeever	Nissan 180SX	40	McKeever Spares	(Northern Ireland)
Rennie Morocco	BMW M3 E36	41	Chizfab	(United Kingdom)
Richard Bradley	Nissan 200SX S14	43	Drift Skillz	(Northern Ireland)
David Waterworth	Nissan 180SX	44	Checkpoint	(United Kingdom)
David Monaghan	Nissan Skyline R32	45	Skyline Owners	(United Kingdom)
Stuart Hansford	Nissan 180SX	46	Privateer	(United Kingdom)
Keith Hammond	Nissan Skyline R32	47	Skyline Owners	(United Kingdom)
Kiyoshi Kawabata	Nissan Silvia S13	51	Driving Sports/Low Brain Drifters	(Japan)
Anthony Scott	Nissan Sileighty	52	Skylinepart.com	(United Kingdom)
Martin Ffrench	Mazda RX7 FD3S	53	Dragon Performance/Touge Heroes	(Republic of Ireland)
Scott Armstrong	Nissan Onevia S15.3 (S13 front, S15 chassis, supercharged RB30 engine)	TBA	Performance Parts & Services Ltd	(United Kingdom)

== 2009 Rounds ==
- Round 1 – April 25, 2009 – Oulton Park Circuit – Won by Phil Morrison
- Round 2 – May 17, 2009 Knockhill Circuit – Won by Pete Barber
- Round 3 – May 31, 2009 Silverstone Circuit – Won by Alan McCord
- Round 4 – June 28, 2009 Brands Hatch – Won by Mark Luney
- Round 5 – July 11, 2009 – Santa Pod Raceway – Won by Phil Morrison
- Round 6 – October 11, 2009 – Snetterton Circuit – Won by Mark Luney
