= 2008 European Drift Championship season =

2008 European Drift Championship

Seasons
- ← 2007 2009 →

The 2008 European Drift Championship season is the second season of the European Drift Championship. The championship was won by Ben Broke-Smith.

== 2008 entry list ==
2008 Japanese Used Cars European Drift Championship Driver	Car	Number	Team/ Major Sponsor	Country
Brett Castle	Nissan 200sx S14a	1	Abbey Motorsport/ Autoglym	(United Kingdom)
Mark Luney	Nissan 350z	2	SVA Imports	(Northern Ireland)
Mark Johnston	Nissan Silvia S13 (TBA)	3	Weston Performance	(Northern Ireland)
Ben Broke-Smith	Toyota Chaser JZX81	4	Driftworks	(United Kingdom)
Maciej Polody	Nissan 200sx S14a	5	Polody Performance	(Poland)
Tony Green	TBA (AE86?)	6	TBA	(New Zealand)
James Grimsey	Nissan 180sx/ Nissan Laurel/ TBA	7	GBH Motorsport	(United Kingdom)
Phil Morrison	Nissan Silvia S15 (2JZ Powers)	8	Driftworks	(United Kingdom)
Chris Parry	Toyota Sprinter Trueno	9	(Major Sponsors = Driftworks, Angelworks, VEMS, Run Free, Japanese Used Cars.com)	(United Kingdom)
Tim Marshall	TBA Nissan Skyline R33 GTS with Chevy V8	10	TBA	(United Kingdom)
Peter Barber	Mazda RX7 FD3S with N/A RX7 engine with RX8 internals	14	Swinton car insurance	(United Kingdom)
Ian Harrison	Nissan Skyline R32	15	Harrison Motorsport	(United Kingdom)
Alan McCord	TBA (Nissan Silvia S15; possibly 2JZ engine)	16	Hi-Octane Imports	(Northern Ireland)
Paul Smith	Nissan Silvia S15	17	TBA	(United Kingdom)
Nobushige Kumakubo	Subaru Impreza GDB (RWD converted, ex D1GP)	TBA	Team Orange	(Japan)
Mark Coyne	Nissan 200sx S14	TBA	TBA	(Republic of Ireland)
Ian Coyne	Nissan 200sx S13	TBA	TBA	(Republic of Ireland)
Scott Armstrong	Nissan Onevia S15.3 (S13 front, S15 chassis, supercharged RB30 engine)	TBA	Performance Parts & Services Ltd	(United Kingdom)
Kazuhiro Tanaka	Subaru Impreza GDB	TBA	Team Orange	(Japan)

- Entrants 1-17
- Kumakubo
- Coyne Brothers
- Armstrong
- Tanaka

More entrants will be added throughout the season including British Drift Championship Wildcard Entries. Round 2 wildcard - Mike Gaynor

== 2008 Rounds ==
- Round 1 - April 5/6th - Donington Park
- Round 2 - May 17/18th Knockhill Circuit
- Round 3 - June 1 Silverstone Circuit
- Round 4 - July 11/12th - Santa Pod Raceway
- Round 5 - September 6/7th Silverstone Circuit
- Round 6 - September 26/27th - Poznan Circuit, Poland
