= Biagioni =

Biagioni is an Italian surname. Notable people with the surname include:

- Amelia Biagioni (1916–2000), Argentine poet and writer
- Serafino Biagioni (1920–1983), Italian cyclist
- Steve Biagioni (born 1987), professional drift driver from Essex
