= Danny Eyles =

Danny Eyles is a professional racing driver specialising in drifting, competing in the British Drift Championship, Prodrift Super Series, European Drift Championship and JDM Allstars series.

Since winning the amateur competition final at Teesside Autodrome in 2006 in his Nissan Skyline R33, Eyles was approached by Team JapSpeed, and was proud to accept the offer of some sponsorship for the following season in 2007 in the Eurodrift Pro class.

Eyles and teammate Shane Lynch later obtained European Drift Championship licences, and later won the team drift event at Knockhill Circuit.

The following year, Eyles achieved consistent results in the EDC, however at the second round at Silverstone Circuit, Eyles and teammate Shane Lynch had a huge collision, totalling both cars.

For 2009, Team Japspeed built two purpose built Nissan Silvia S15 drift cars for Lynch and Eyles to replace the cars which were totalled. For this season, Team Japspeed competed in the British Drift Championship and Prodrift Super Series. Eyles achieved his first win in the new car at the Prodrift event at Donington Park, and won both final rounds of the BDC. Eyles finished the BDC season in second place behind teammate Steve Biagioni, and fourth in Prodrift.

In 2011, Eyles left the Japspeed team and was replaced by Shane O'Sullivan.

In 2014, Japspeed announced that Eyles was rejoining their team and stated that he still held the record for "the most consecutive podium finishes in UK drifting" for his 2009-2010 wins.
