= Paul Smith (drift driver) =

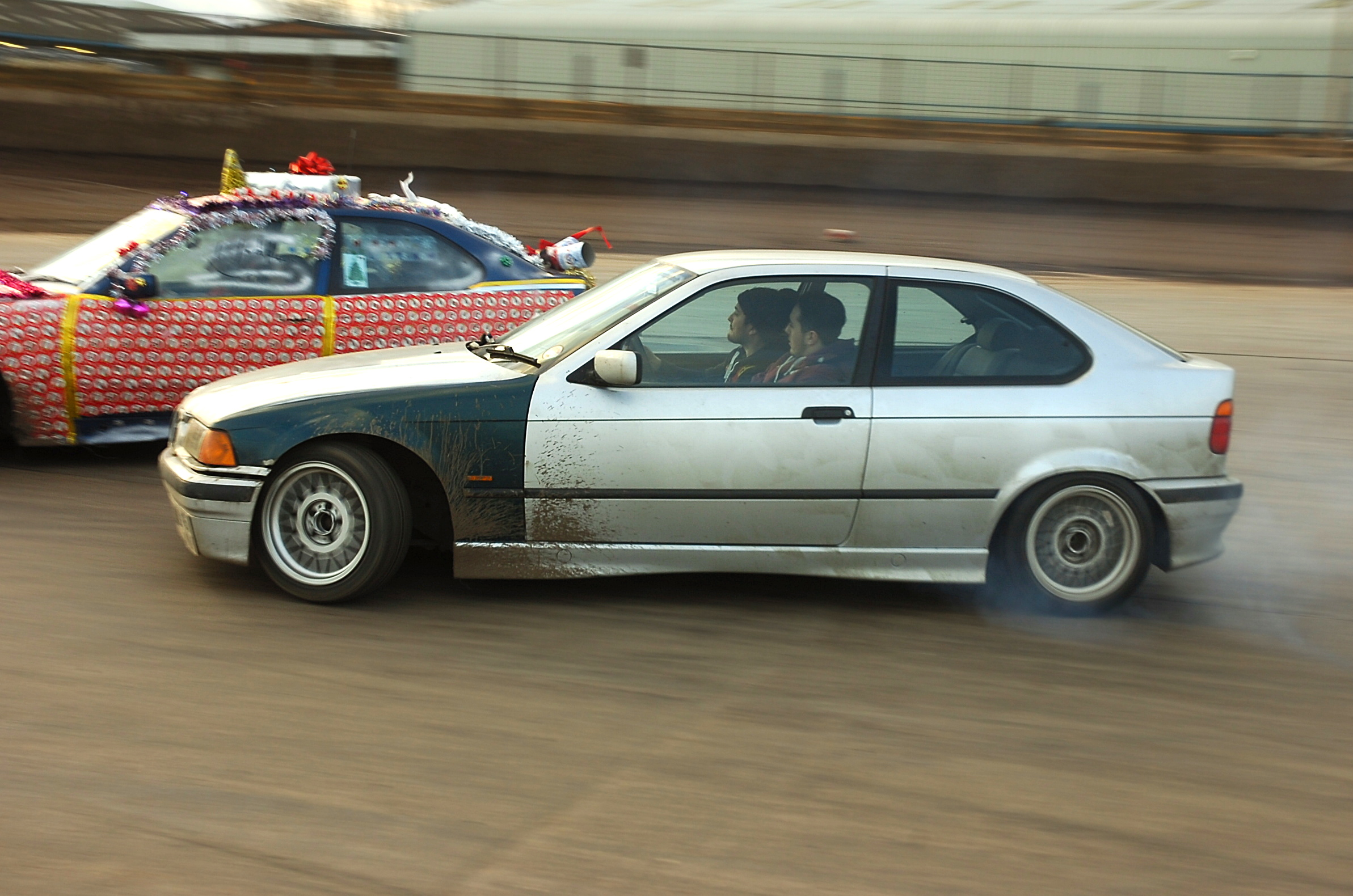
- Paul Smith (foreground) at a practice day at the Adrian Flux Arena.
- Born: 23 January 1980 (age 46)
- Nationality: United Kingdom

British Drift Championship career
- Current team: Japspeed

Championship titles
- 2012: British Drift Championship

Paul "Smokey" Smith (born 23 January 1980) is a British professional drift driver from Spalding, Lincolnshire. He drives a 1JZ powered Nissan Silvia S15 for Team Japspeed. He won the British Drift Championship in 2012 after several years of competition.

== Career ==
Smith began drifting in 2004 in a Nissan 200SX at a Silverstone Circuit practice day. During the following year, he began competing in the UKD1 Autoglym Clubman Championship in a newly built Nissan Skyline R32, finishing the season in second place, missing out on the title by a single point.

Smith continued competing in the Pro-Am Eurodrift Championship until he obtained a European Drift Championship license at the final round of the 2007 season, qualifying fifth overall. He competed in EDC in 2008, achieving top-eight finishes.

Smith competed in the British Drift Championship from 2009, achieving several podium finishes, until 2012, a season in which he showed vast improvement as a driver and won the championship at Knockhill Racing Circuit.
