= The Hunts =

Book of poems by Amelia Biagioni

- Author: Amelia Biagioni
- Language: Spanish
- Publisher: Xenos Books
- Publication date: Jan. 1 2003
- ISBN: 1-879-37844-2

The Hunts (Spanish: Las Cacerías) by Amelia Biagioni, is a book of poems written originally in Spanish. It was originally published in 1976.

== Publication ==
The book was originally published in Spanish in 1976. An English translation was published by Xenos Books in 2003, translated by Renata Treitel.

== Themes ==
The book contains themes of dynamism, with a "longing for communion" and dualistic elements; in the words of one commentator, "Good and evil, light and darkness, the hunter and the prey are the obverse and the reverse". One commentator described a poem in the work, Oh tenebrosa fulgurante, as showing that "writing has become a ritual of devouring the subject in its character as a closed instance and origin or cause of artistic practice, in order to convert it into its effect."

== Reception ==
Rafael Carlos Quesada, writing for the newspaper El Litoral, described the work as advancing Biagioni in her "profound inquiry that brings her closer to metaphysics", calling its structure hermetic through its usage of obscure and hard to understand terms. He argued that though this may seem strange to some readers, through exploring it one would find "the permanence of Amelia Biagioni", and that the book was filled with complex themes that made it hard to simplify.

== Editions ==
- Translated from Spanish, and with an Introduction by Renata Treitel. Grand Terrace, CA: Xenos Books. ISBN 1-879378-44-2 (paper), 135 p.
