= Nissan 240SX =

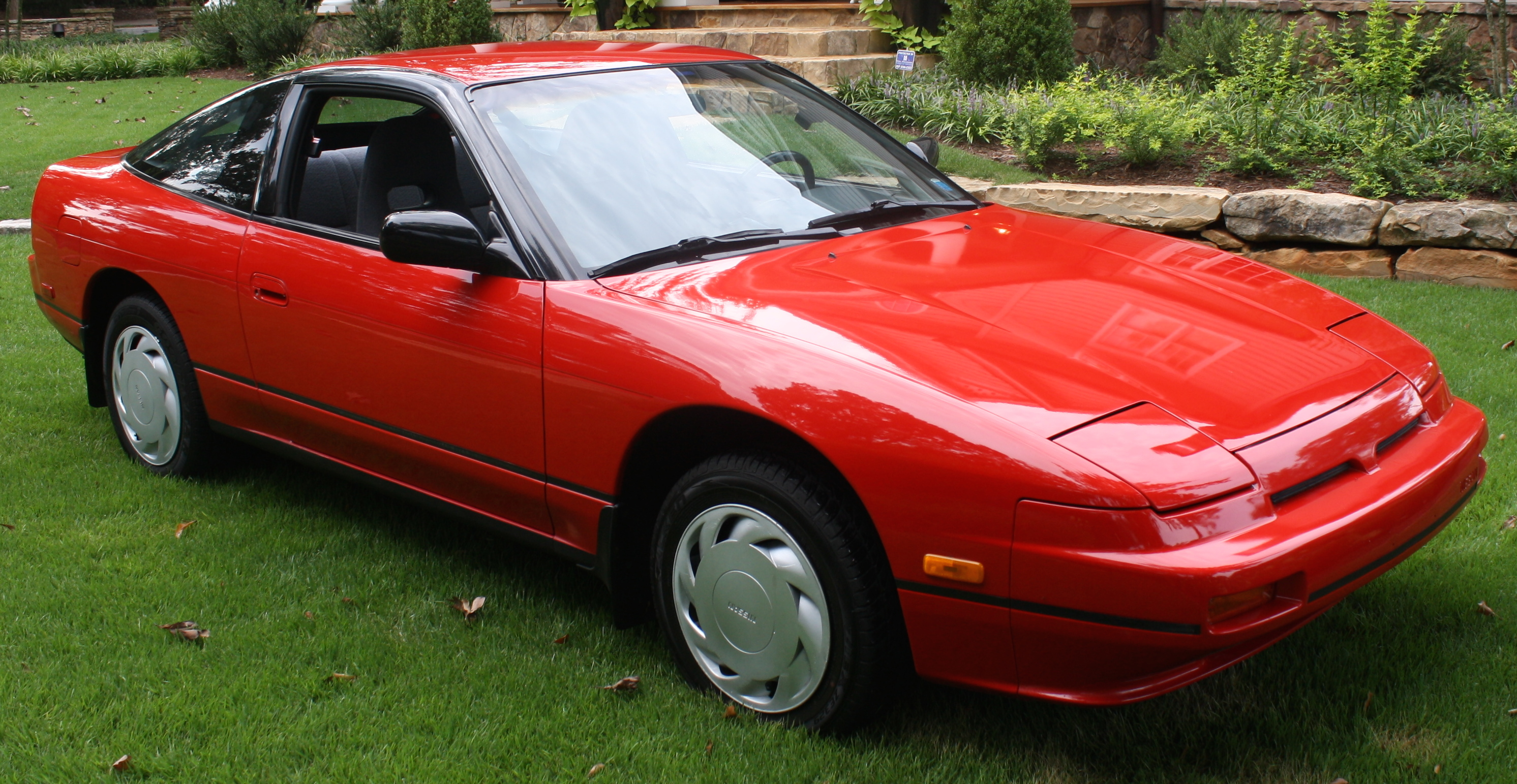
- 1990 Nissan 240SX SE Hatchback (S13)

Overview
- Manufacturer: Nissan
- Production: 1988–1998
- Model years: 1989-1998
- Assembly: Japan: Kanda, Fukuoka (Nissan Motor Kyūshū)

Body and chassis
- Class: Sports car
- Layout: FR layout
- Platform: Nissan S platform
- Related: Nissan Silvia; Nissan 180SX/200SX

Chronology
- Predecessor: Nissan 200SX

The Nissan 240SX is a sports compact car that was introduced to the North American market by Nissan in 1988 for the 1989 model year, replacing the outgoing 200SX (S12) model. Two distinct generations of the 240SX, the S13 (1989–1994) the S14 (1994-1998) were produced, based on the Nissan S platform.

All 240SXs were equipped with the 2.4-liter KA inline-four engine series (the KA24E from 1989 to 1990 and KA24DE from 1990 to 1998). The KA24E has a single overhead cam while the KA24DE has dual overhead cams.

The 240SX is closely related to other S platform based vehicles, such as the Japanese-market Silvia and 180SX, and the European-market 200SX. Although their names are similar, the 240SX is unrelated to the 240Z or the 280ZX, which are sports cars based on a different platform than the 240SX.

The 240SX is known for its popularity within drifting and tuner culture. However, due to the popularity of the S-chassis in drifting and related competitions, prices for vehicles and parts have greatly increased due to higher demand. This problem is sometimes known as "drift tax".

== First generation (S13; 1989–1994) ==
First generation (S13)
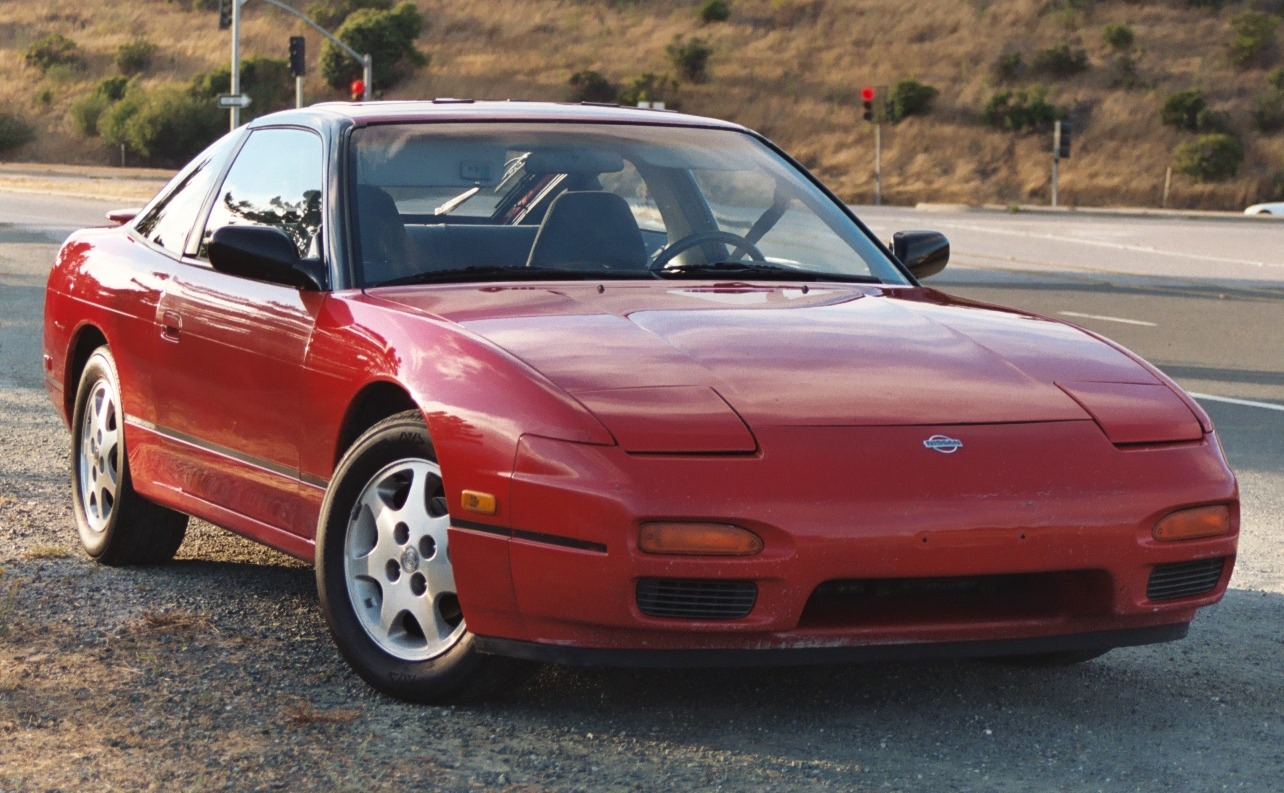
- Facelift model Nissan 240SX SE Hatchback (S13)

Overview
- Production: 1988–1994
- Model years: 1989-1994

Body and chassis
- Body style: 2-door coupé 3-door hatchback 2-door convertible

Powertrain
- Engine: 2.4 L KA24E/KA24DE I4
- Transmission: 5-speed manual; 4-speed automatic

Dimensions
- Wheelbase: 2,474 mm (97.4 in)
- Length: 4,521 mm (178.0 in)
- Width: 1,689 mm (66.5 in)
- Height: 1,290 mm (50.8 in)
- Curb weight: 1,224 kg (2,698 lb)

The first generation of the 240SX can be divided into two distinct versions: the hatchback, which was offered in base, SE, and LE trims, and the coupé, which was offered in base, XE, LE and SE trims. Both styles shared the same front bodywork as the Japanese-market Nissan 180SX, featuring the sloping front with pop-up headlights. This front bodywork distinguishes the coupé model from its Japanese-market counterpart, the Silvia, which featured fixed headlights. Both styles in all markets share the same chassis, and with few exceptions, most components and features are identical. A convertible model built by ASC was offered late in the first generation 240SX's lifespan from 1993 to 1994 and was based on the coupé models.

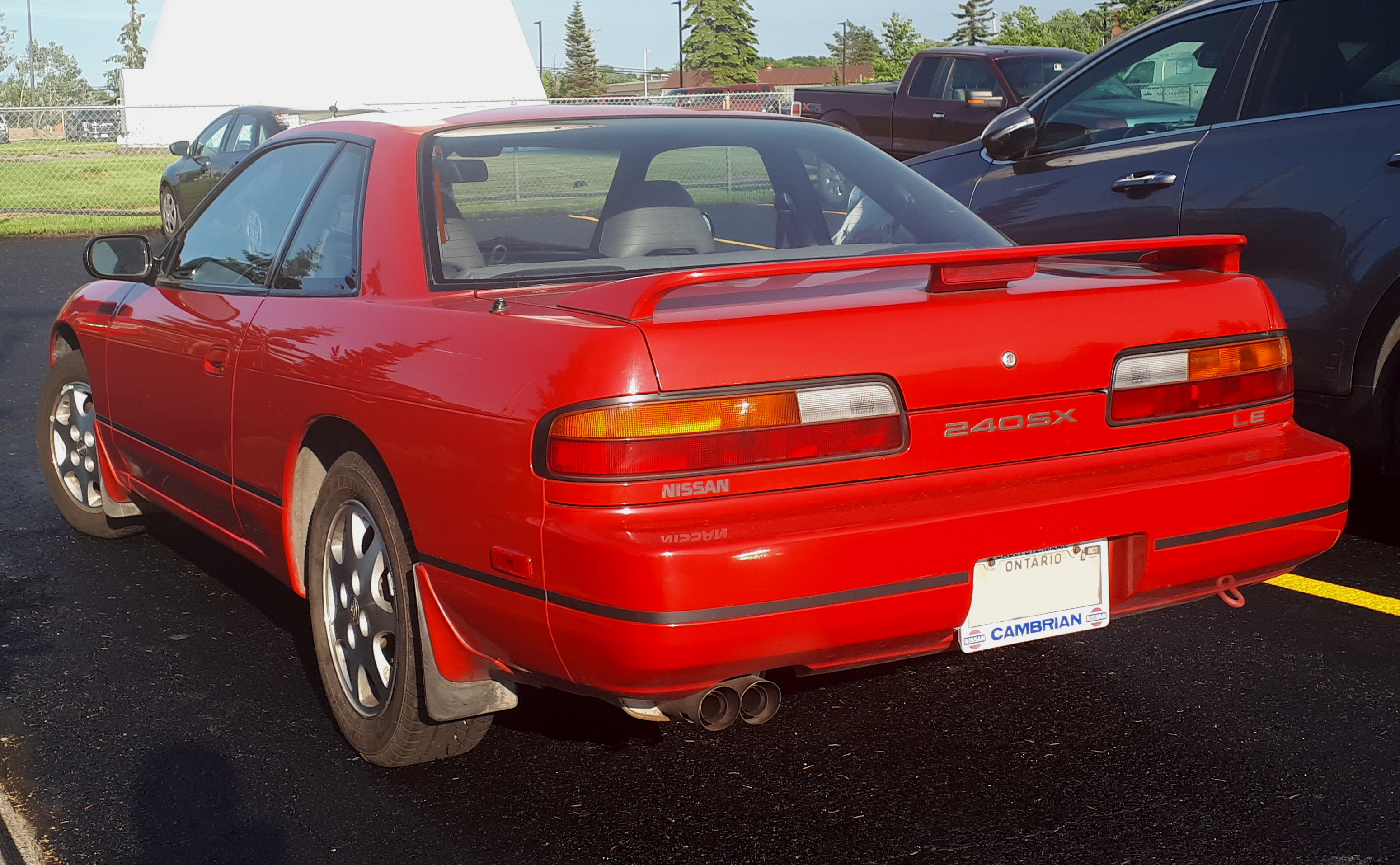
1991-1993 Nissan 240SX LE coupé (rear)

1989 and 1990 models are powered by a naturally aspirated 140 hp (104 kW), 152 lb⋅ft (206 N⋅m) 2,389 cc (2.4 L; 145.8 cu in) SOHC KA24E four-cylinder engine with three valves per cylinder (instead of the turbocharged and intercooled 1.8 L DOHC CA18DET offered in Japan and Europe for the Silvia, 180SX and 200SX respectively). When tested by Car and Driver, the SOHC 240SX achieved a 0-60 mph (97 km/h) time of 8.6 seconds and a quarter mile time of 16.4 seconds at 83 mph (134 km/h). Four-wheel disc brakes were standard, with anti-lock brakes available as an option on the SE. Both models were offered with either a 5-speed manual or 4-speed automatic transmission. Coupes offered a Heads-up display (HUD) with a digital speedometer as part of the optional Power Convenience Group.

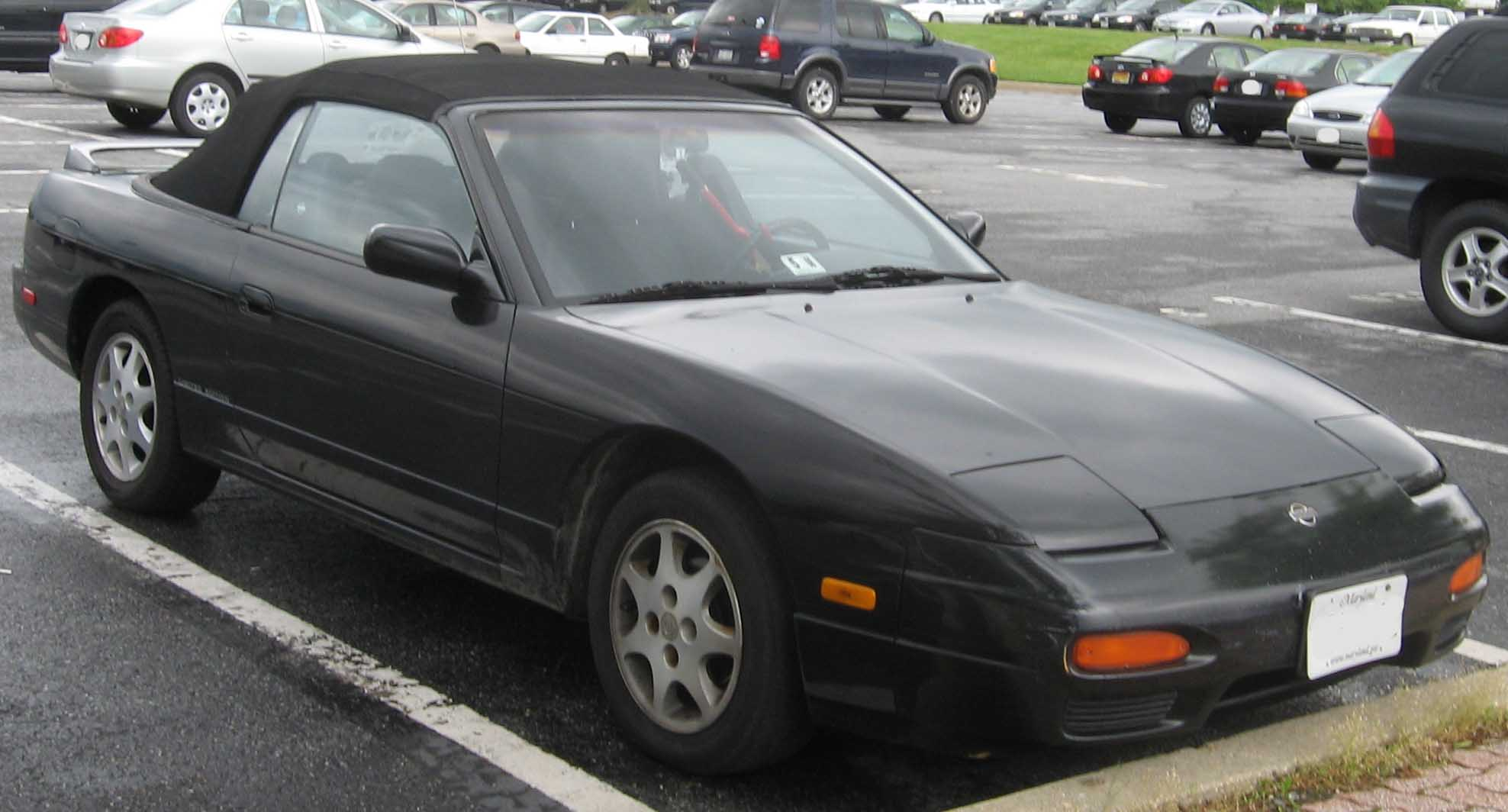
1993–1994 Nissan 240SX convertible

The 240SX received some updates in 1991. The matte silver, teardrop wheels were replaced by polished aluminium 7-spoke wheels that had better brake cooling properties but more drag. The nose was smoothed out by getting rid of the non-functional slots and gave back the aerodynamic efficiencies lost by the wheels. This gave the car an overhaul that included a minor update of the exterior and a new cylinder head. A new "LE" hatchback trim package was added that included leather interior. The SOHC KA24E was replaced by the DOHC KA24DE, now with 4 valves per cylinder, rated at 155 bhp (157 PS; 116 kW) at 5,600 rpm and 160 lb⋅ft (217 N⋅m) of torque at 4,400 rpm. When tested by Car and Driver, the DOHC 240SX achieved a 0-60 mph (97 km/h) time of 7.9 seconds and a quarter mile time of 16.2 seconds at 84 mph (135 km/h). An optional sports package including ABS, a limited-slip differential, and Nissan's HICAS four-wheel steering was now available on hatchback models.

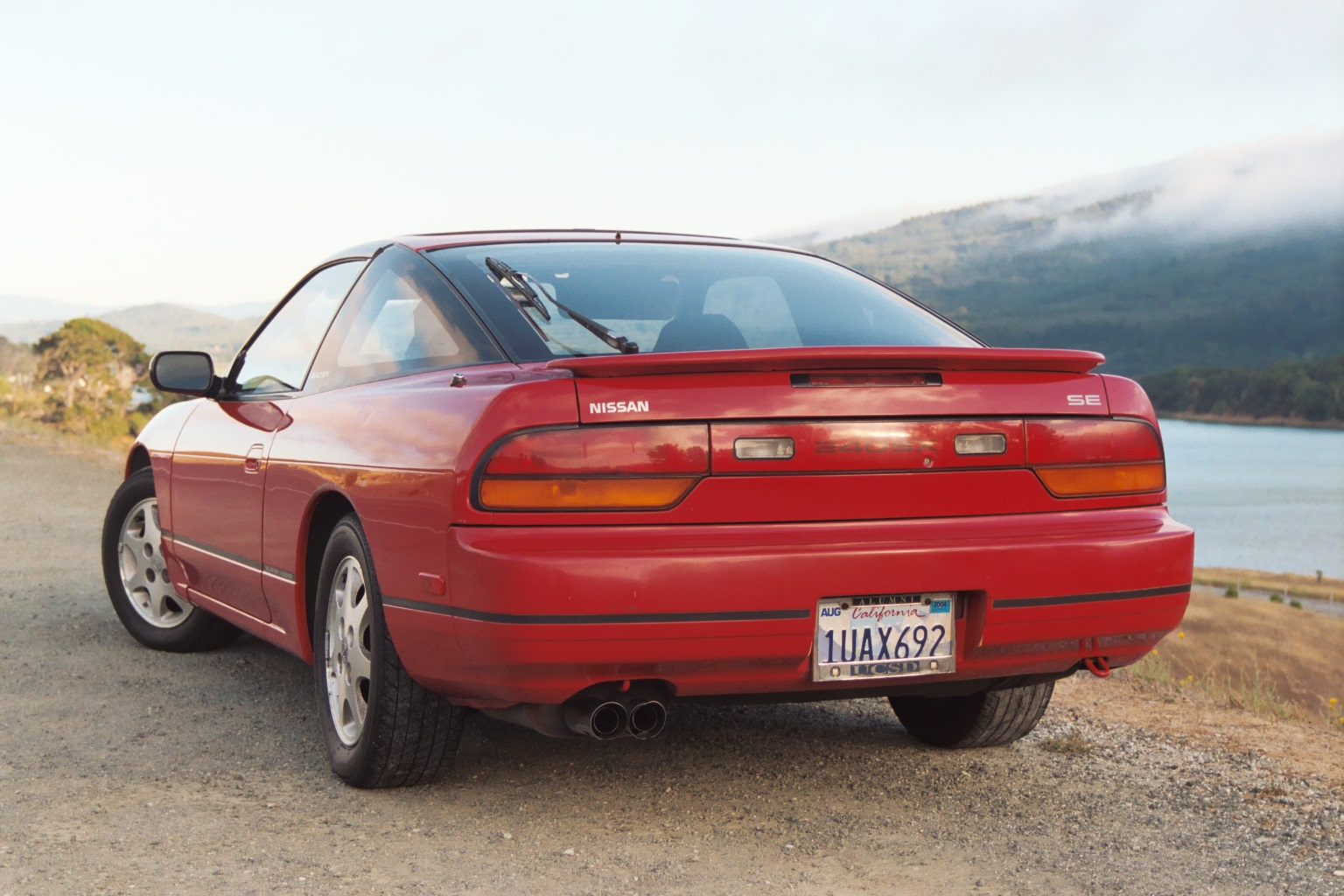
Facelift model Nissan 240SX SE Hatchback (S13) (rear)

The 240SX was praised by journalists for sharp steering and handling (thanks to front MacPherson struts and a rear multilink suspension) and relatively light weight, but was regarded in the automotive press as being underpowered. The engine, while durable and relatively torquey, was a heavy iron-block truck unit that produced meager power for its relatively large size. It was only modestly improved by the change to the DOHC version in 1991. Furthermore, despite the modest power output, relatively low weight, and good aerodynamics, gas mileage was mediocre. The engines are a primary difference between the North American 240SX and the international-market Silvia/180SX/200SX. The KA24DE did not come turbocharged while the CA18DET and SR20DET did. Other differences include a standard limited-slip differential on overseas and Canadian models, digital climate control in Japan, and manual seat belts standard in Japan and Canada vs. automatic restraint seatbelts in the U.S.

== Second generation (S14; 1994–1998) ==
Second generation (S14)
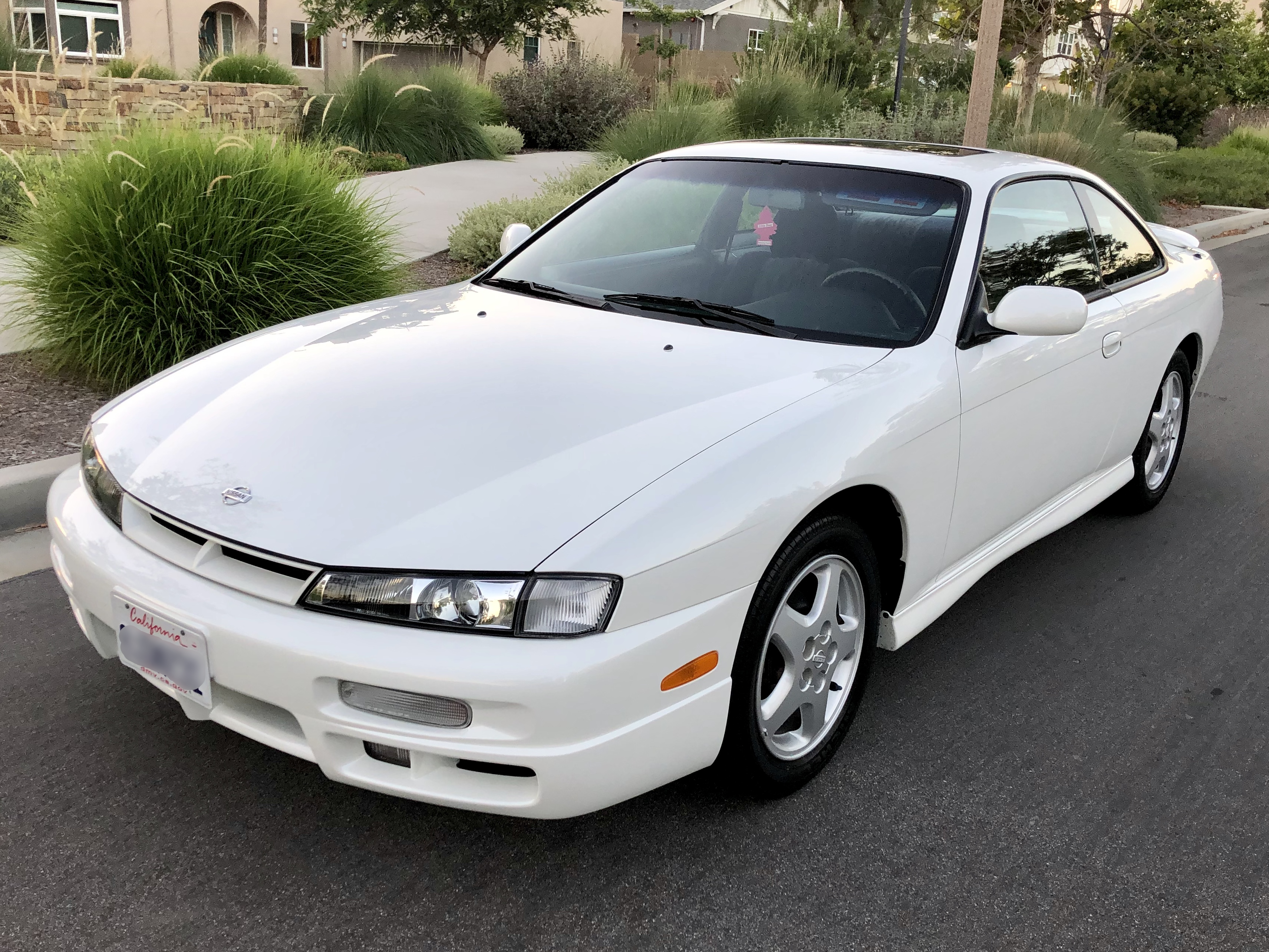
- Facelift model Nissan 240SX SE (S14) "Kouki"

Overview
- Production: 1994–1998
- Model years: 1995–1998

Body and chassis
- Body style: 2-door coupe

Powertrain
- Engine: 2.4 L KA24DE I4 (gasoline)
- Transmission: 4-speed automatic; 5-speed manual

Dimensions
- Wheelbase: 2,525 mm (99.4 in)
- Length: 4,498 mm (177.1 in)
- Width: 1,727 mm (68.0 in)
- Height: 1,288 mm (50.7 in)
- Curb weight: 1,253 kg (2,762.4 lb)

The second generation 240SX was released in the spring of 1994 as a 1995 model. The hatchback and convertible body styles were eliminated, leaving only the coupe. The wheelbase of the car grew 2 in (51 mm) and the track width was also increased, while the overall length of the vehicle was slightly shorter than the previous generation. The curb weight of the vehicle increased by about 80 lb (36 kg) relative to the 1994 model. During this generation, all 240SXs were built in Kyūshū, Japan.

Dual air bags were added and the automatic seatbelts were replaced with common manual type. Cup holders were also eliminated. The pop-up headlamps were replaced with fixed headlamps. Though the general layout remained the same, almost all parts were redesigned to the extent that very few parts are interchangeable. The chassis was changed slightly to increase stiffness (Nissan claimed 50% torsional, 100% bending rigidity increase) and utilized higher rear strut mounts. The fuel tank, previously located at the rear end under the trunk floor, now sits in front of the rear suspension and behind the rear seats.

The second generation carried over the naturally aspirated DOHC KA24DE engine from the first generation, producing the same 155 bhp (157 PS; 116 kW) at 5,600 rpm and 160 lb⋅ft (217 N⋅m) of torque at 4,400 rpm, but with internal revisions for improved throttle response and reduced shake and vibration. When tested by MotorWeek, the 240SX achieved a 0-60 mph (97 km/h) time of 7.3 seconds and a quarter mile time of 15.5 seconds at 89 mph (143 km/h). Upon its launch, Nissan said the primary target demographic for the new 240SX was single women with no children, stating that women already made up 61% of 240SX buyers, and that they hoped to increase that number.

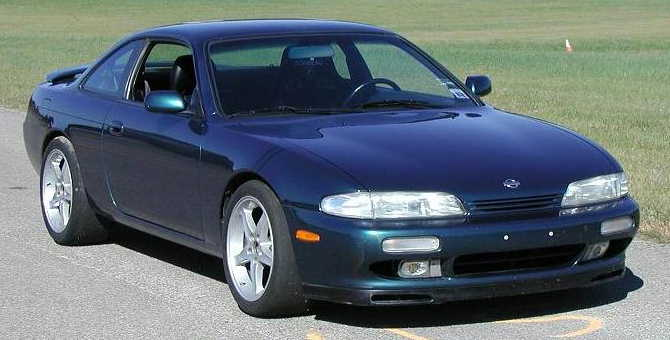
Nissan 240SX (S14) pre-facelift "Zenki"

The base model had 4-lug, 15-inch wheels, a softer suspension, and no rear sway bar. The base model had several options and features available to be fitted to the car such as leather seats, ABS, and a viscous limited-slip differential. The SE and LE models were equipped with 5-lug, 16-inch alloy wheels, a stiffer suspension setup compared to the base model, and a rear sway bar. The LE variant essentially served as an upgraded version of the SE, offering additional standard features such as leather seats, keyless entry, an anti-theft system, and a CD player. Both the base and SE/LE models offered anti-lock brakes and a viscous limited-slip differential as part of an optional package.

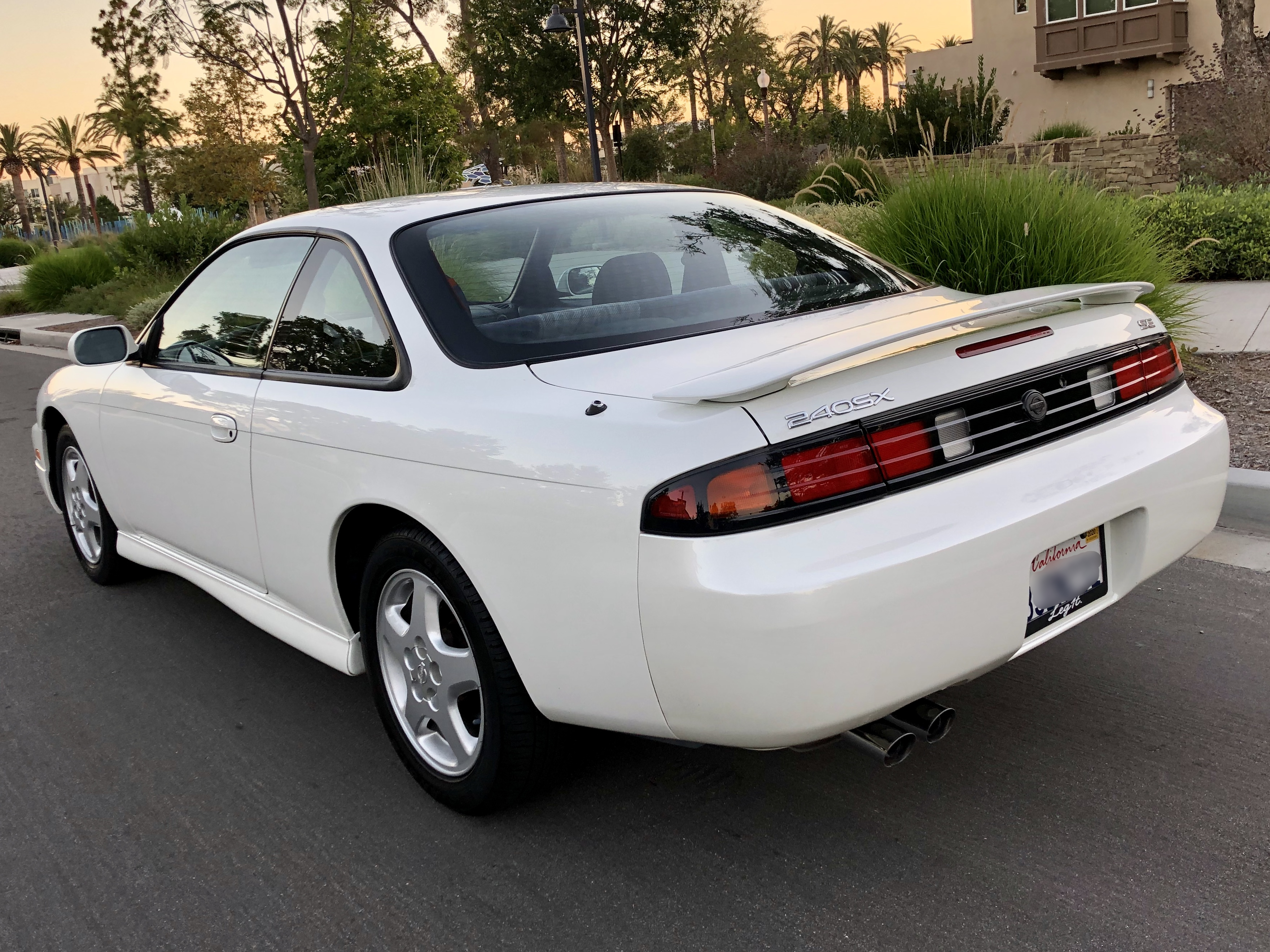
Nissan 240SX SE (S14) facelift "Kouki" (rear)

In 1996, the 1997 model year 240SX received minor updates. The different looks of the S-Chassis are referred to as before change ("Zenki") and after change ("Kouki"). Changes were mostly aesthetic, such as new projector headlights, front bumper, hood, fenders, and revised taillights and center panel. Side skirts became standard on the SE and LE trim level.

This generation of the 240SX (as well as other sports cars of the time) suffered in sales due to competition from other car manufacturers and consumers at the time choosing more practical vehicles, such as SUVs. 1998 marked the end of production for the Nissan 240SX, with no further variations released in North America. The last 240SX rolled off the assembly line on July 23, 1998.

== Motorsports ==
=== Circuit Racing ===
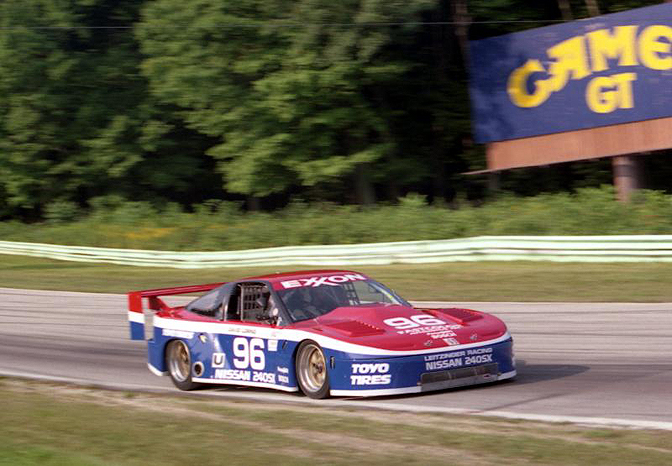
Nissan 240SX IMSA GT racing car

The IMSA GTU-spec Nissan 240SX was built to compete in the IMSA GTU class, featuring a custom-fabricated tube chassis and a naturally aspirated Nissan VG30 V6 engine with a dry sump which produced around 340 horsepower. While externally resembling a standard Nissan S13, very few components are shared with its production counterpart; according to Speedhunters, "The roofline and taillight lenses are some of the only parts [shared] with a normal S13".

The car was originally driven by veteran Datsun and Nissan racer Bob Leitzinger. The chassis, numbered LR-001, participated in nearly 80 competitive events, and aided Nissan in winning four consecutive IMSA GTU manufacturers' championship titles between 1991 and 1994. As of September 2016 the car is owned and raced by Philip Mendelovitz

=== Drifting ===
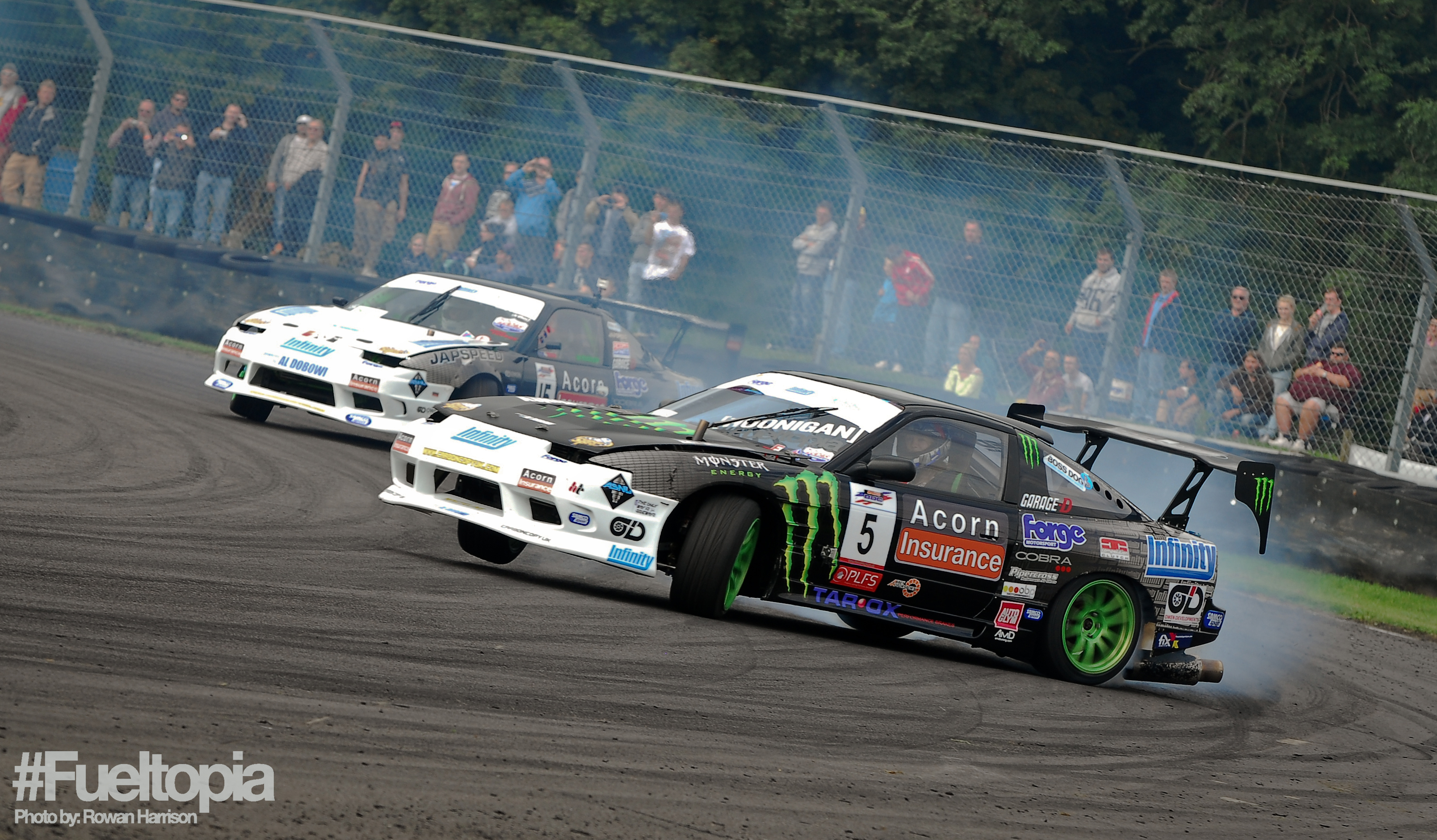
Two 240SXs drifting in tandem

The Nissan 240SX is a popular platform within the drifting community, both in amateur competition as well as in professional series such as Formula D. Although never marketed to the drifting community during its production, its Japanese counterparts, the Nissan 180SX and Nissan Silvia (S13), were adopted in Japan during the foundational years of drifting. They were chosen for their balanced weight distribution of 55/45 front to rear, and their overall lightweight RWD layout.
