= Ben Broke-Smith =

English racing driver

- Born: September 1985 (age 40)
- Nationality: United Kingdom

British Drift Championship career
- Current team: Car Media Racing

Championship titles
- 2008: European Drift Championship

Ben 'Bon Bon' Broke-Smith (born September 1985) is a professional drift driver from the United Kingdom.

Broke-Smith won the European Drift Championship in 2008, driving a Toyota Chaser JZX81. For the 2009 season, he switched to a Nissan Skyline R32 with a 1JZ engine and narrowly missed out on the Prodrift Super Series title.

After a few years out of competition, Broke-Smith made his return to the British Drift Championship in 2013, now back in a JZX81 Chaser.

On August 5, 2016, Broke-Smith married long-term girlfriend Samantha Wilson.
