= Maciej Polody =

Polish drifting driver

Maciej Polody (born 30 September 1976) is a drifting driver from Poznań, Poland. Driving a Nissan 200SXa S14, he is the Polish driver to compete in the D1 Grand Prix series, debuting in 2006 for D1GB, the British national series and was one of the few invited to compete against the experienced Japanese drivers in the Silverstone exhibition that year. He now competes in the European Drift Championship, the successor to the D1GB.

Polody's car
