= Nissan S platform =

Car platform

The Nissan S-platform was Nissan's rear wheel drive sports automobile platform, produced in seven generations from 1976 to 2002. It was sold in every major market where Nissan cars were available. It was usually equipped with an inline four-cylinder engine, and had four seats in a "two-plus-two" configuration.

== Model/Engine/Region Breakdown ==
Chassis	Name	Market	Year	Engine	Notes
S10	Silvia	Japan	1976–1979	L18	Based on B210.
S10	200SX	North America	1976–1979	L20B	Based on B210.
S11	Silvia	Not sold	1980	Twin Rotor Wankel engine	Originally designed for Wankel engine.; Based on B310/A10.
S110	Silvia	Japan	1980–1983	Z18, Z20, FJ20	Notchback.; S11 with 4-stroke engines, zero added to model name S11 > S110.
S110	Gazelle	Japan	1980–1983	Z18, Z20, FJ20	Fastback with hatch.; S11 with 4-stroke engines, zero added to model name S11 > S110.
S110	240RS	Japan	1982–1984	FJ24	Group B Rallying homologation model. BS110
S110	180SX	Europe	1980–1983	Z18, L18E	Only available as fastback with hatch.
S110	200SX	North America	1980–1983	Z20	
S110	Sakura	México	1982 - 1986	L18	Only available as coupe fastback
S12	Silvia	Japan	1984–1987	CA18, CA18ET, FJ20, FJ20ET	
S12	Silvia	Japan	1988	CA18DET	1.8 DOHC turbo
S12	Silvia	Europe	1984–1988	FJ20, CA18ET	2.0 DOHC, 1.8 SOHC turbo
S12	Gazelle	Japan	1984–1987	CA18, CA18ET, FJ20, FJ20ET	Nearly identical to Silvia sold in Japan.
S12	Gazelle	Australia	1984–1988	CA20	2.0 SOHC
S12	180ZX	Sweden/Scandinavia	1988	CA18ET	Similar to Silvia sold in the rest of Europe.
S12	200SX	North America	1984–1988	CA20E	
S12	200SX	North America	1984–1986	CA18ET	1.8 SOHC turbo; sold through 1988 in Canada.
S12	200SX	North America	1987–1988	VG30E	3.0L V6, model used for Nissan WRC Group A rally car when Group B 240RS was banned.
S13	Silvia	Japan	1989–1993	CA18DE, CA18DET, SR20DE, SR20DET	Notchback, fixed head lights.
S13	180SX	Japan	1989–1998	CA18DET, SR20DE, SR20DET	Fastback with hatch. Pop up headlamps.
S13	Sileighty	Japan	1998	SR20DE, SR20DET	Produced for Nissan by Kid's Heart. 180SX Fastback with hatch. Fixed head lights from Silvia.
S13	200SX	Europe/New Zealand	1989–1994	CA18DET	Fastback with hatch. Pop up headlamps.
S13	240SX	North America	1989–1990	KA24E	Both notchback and fastback with hatch. Pop up headlamps.
S13	240SX	North America	1991–1994	KA24E, KA24DE	
S14	Silvia	Japan	1994–1998	SR20DE, SR20DET	
S14	200SX	Europe/Australia/New Zealand	1994–1998	SR20DET	
S14	240SX	USA	1995–1998	KA24DE	
S15	Silvia	Japan	1999–2002	SR20DE, SR20DET	
S15	200SX	Australia/New Zealand	1999–2002 (NZ); 2000–2002 (AU)	SR20DET	
