= British Drift Championship =

- Category: Drifting
- Country: United Kingdom
- Inaugural season: 2008
- Folded: 2022
- Official website: thebritishdriftchampionship.co.uk

The British Drift Championship was a drifting series held in the UK.

The series began in 2008 as a feeder series to the European Drift Championship. However, the partnership between the BDC and EDC organisers ended at the end of the season and the BDC became a professional series in its own right.

The series originally had two classes, Semi-Pro and Pro. However, due to the vast growth of the championship a third class was added for the 2011 season, called 'Super Pro' which became the highest class. The top drivers in the Pro class were merged into this new class.

For the 2015 season the championship reverted to two classes; the three classes from 2014 were merged to create the Pro-Am and Pro class. A feeder series called Drift Cup was created to allow those wishing to take part in the series the chance to prove they have what it takes to drive in the main championship.

In 2016, the series was taken over by the owner of the Irish Drift Championship, David Egan. Following the conclusion of the 2018 season, it was announced that Egan would be stepping down from his position, to be replaced by Matt Stevenson, a BDC Pro driver and 2014 Semi-Pro champion.

Stevenson sold the championship to his understudy Frost at the end of 2020 after failing to make it a success.

At the end of the 2022 season, the championship folded due to the impact of the COVID-19 pandemic and increasing costs.

== Champions ==
Pro-Am Class (previously Semi-Pro)

| Year | Driver | Team | Car |
|---|---|---|---|
| 2008 | Steve Moore | | Nissan 200SX S14a |
| 2009 | Martin Richards | | Nissan Skyline R33 |
| 2010 | Ian Phillips | Skyline Owners | Nissan Skyline R33 |
| 2011 | Matt Campling | Dorihero | Nissan 200SX S13 |
| 2012 | Owen Taylor | Rampstyle | Nissan Silvia S13 |
| 2013 | Matt Samuel | Car Loan 4 U | Nissan 300ZX |
| 2014 | Matt Stevenson | Slide Motorsport | Nissan 350Z |
| 2015 | Fraser Stark | Garage F***House | BMW E30 Touring |
| 2016 | Danny Grundy | Essex Drifters | Nissan 200SX S14 |
| 2017 | Scott Cartledge | | Nissan Skyline R33 |
| 2018 | Lee Scott | Finvoy Tyre Services | BMW E46 |
| 2019 | Lwi Edwards | Allitalia | BMW E36 |
| 2022 | Craig Macleod | Craig Does Drift | Nissan 200SX S14 |

Pro Class

| Year | Driver | Team | Car |
|---|---|---|---|
| 2008 | Dave Walbrin | | Nissan Skyline R32 |
| 2009 | Steve 'Baggsy' Biagioni | Japspeed | Nissan 200SX S13 |
| 2010 | Phil Morrison | Driftworks | Nissan Silvia S15 |
| 2011 | Michael Marshall | MnM Engineering | Nissan Silvia S15 |
| 2012 | Christian Lewis | Dorihero | Nissan Skyline R33 |
| 2013 | Jay Greene | JapsTheOnlyWay.co.uk | Nissan 200SX S13 |
| 2014 | Richard Grindrod | Driftworks | BMW E36 V8 |
| 2015 | Jack Shanahan | Driftworks/Shanahan Car Sales | Nissan 200SX S14 |
| 2016 | Jack Shanahan | Shanahan Car Sales | Nissan 180SX |
| 2017 | Matt Carter | Japspeed | Nissan Skyline R32 |
| 2018 | Duane McKeever | Tri-Ace Tyres | Nissan 180SX |
| 2019 | Oliver Evans | VP Racing Fuels | Nissan 200SX |
| 2020 | Duane McKeever | Tri-Ace Tyres | Nissan 180SX |
| 2021 | Duane McKeever | Tri-Ace Tyres | Nissan 180SX |
| 2022 | Dylan Garvey | 59 North Wheels | Nissan 180SX |

Super Pro Class (merged into Pro from 2015)

| Year | Driver | Team | Car |
|---|---|---|---|
| 2011 | Matt Carter | Falken Tires | Nissan 200SX S14a |
| 2012 | Paul Smith | Japspeed | Nissan Silvia S15 |
| 2013 | Michael Marshall | Team MnM | BMW E36 Touring |
| 2014 | Shane O'Sullivan | Japspeed | Nissan Silvia S15 |

== See also ==
- D1 Grand Prix
- Formula D
- Drift Allstars
