= Nissan FJ engine =

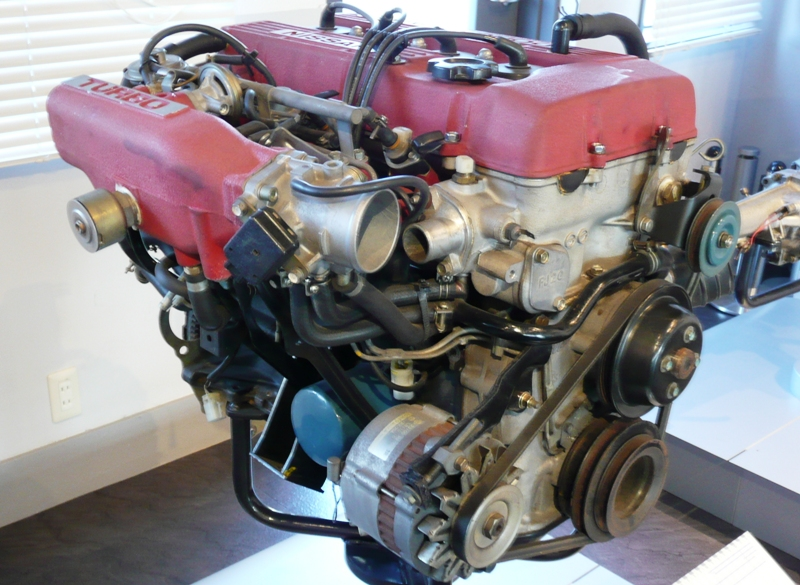
- FJ20ET engine in the Nissan Engine Museum

Overview
- Manufacturer: Nissan Machinery

Layout
- Configuration: Straight-4
- Displacement: 2.0–2.3 L (1,990–2,340 cc)
- Cylinder bore: 89 mm (3.5 in); 92 mm (3.62 in)
- Piston stroke: 80 mm (3.15 in); 88 mm (3.46 in)
- Cylinder block material: Cast Iron
- Cylinder head material: Aluminium
- Valvetrain: DOHC 4 valves x cyl.
- Valvetrain drive system: Timing Chain
- Compression ratio: 8.0:1-11.0:1

Combustion
- Turbocharger: On some versions
- Fuel system: Carburetor; Electronic fuel injection
- Fuel type: Gasoline
- Oil system: Wet sump
- Cooling system: Water-cooled

Output
- Power output: 150–275 PS (110–202 kW; 148–271 hp)
- Torque output: 18.5–25 kg⋅m (181–245 N⋅m; 134–181 lb⋅ft)

Dimensions
- Dry weight: 167 kg (368 lb)

The FJ engine was a series of straight-4 four-valve DOHC 2.0- or 2.4–litre internal combustion engines produced by Nissan in the 1980s. They were one of the first mass-produced Japanese engines with more than two valves per cylinder, as well as having electronic fuel injection.

The FJ series came in 2.4 L guise as a rally motor for the 240RS and 2.0 L for general production models. A 1.5 L variant was designed and a prototype was built, however it never went into production.

The FJ series has an aluminium head, chain driven cams, and an iron block. It featured large ports, dual valve-springs and a wide angle bucket on shim valve-train design similar to other (later) Nissan twin-cams such as the VG, CA, RB, and KA series DOHC motors as well as the previous S20 straight-6 DOHC motor from the early 1970s GT-R. The FJ20 weighs 166 kg (366 lb) while the FJ24 weighs 167 kg (368 lb). Turbo motors were only available in Japan and New Zealand while the non-turbo variants were available in Japan, Hong-Kong, Australia and Europe. It was discontinued in the mid-1980s due to its prohibitive cost (mainly due to its cast-iron block).

It is acclaimed by some as the forefather of the CA engine. Although the DOHC CA head is similar, this is unlikely, as the SOHC CA head was devised as a lightweight replacement for the L/Z series motors when the FJ first entered production, and the DOHC CA head appeared later when the RB series was released around the same time as the DOHC CA engines. Datsun enthusiasts like to swap FJ engines into L or Z series-powered vehicles. The FJ has similar mounting points to L/Z/KA blocks.

== Specifications ==
NOTE: These engines were developed before Nissan used the "D" designation for dual overhead camshafts, a practice that would be first used with the CA series of engines in the mid-1980s. The FJ is indeed a DOHC 16 valve design with mechanically actuated cam on bucket follower design. The head is aluminium and the block is iron.

	FJ20E	FJ20ET	FJ20ET With intercooler	FJ24
Total displacement	2.0 L (1,990 cc)			2.3 L (2,340 cc)
Bore × stroke	89 mm × 80 mm (3.50 in × 3.15 in)			92 mm × 88 mm (3.62 in × 3.46 in)
Compression ratio	9.1:1	8.0:1	8.5:1	11.0:1
Max power at rpm	150 PS (110 kW; 148 hp) at 6,000	190 PS (140 kW; 187 hp) at 6,400	205 PS (151 kW; 202 hp) at 6,400	240 PS (177 kW; 237 hp) at 7,200
Max torque at rpm	18.5 kg⋅m (181 N⋅m; 134 lb⋅ft) at 4,800	23 kg⋅m (226 N⋅m; 166 lb⋅ft) at 4,800	25 kg⋅m (245 N⋅m; 181 lb⋅ft) at 4,400	24 kg⋅m (235 N⋅m; 174 lb⋅ft) at 6,000
First use	Oct 1981 DR30 Skyline 2000RS	Feb 1983 DR30 Skyline 2000RS-Turbo	Apr 1984 DR30 Skyline 2000RS-Turbo C	1983 S110 240RS

The numerical value is gross mark (engine single purpose crankshaft output).
A part of numerical value is different by Skyline and Silvia/Gazelle.
There is a version of the FJ24 with 275 PS (202 kW; 271 hp).

== FJ20E ==
Distinguished by the "E" for "Electronic Fuel Injection". Maximum output was 150 PS (110 kW).

The FJ20E was installed in the DR30 Skyline RS, as well as the US110 and S12 Gazelle/Silvia RS and GP models.

== FJ20ET ==
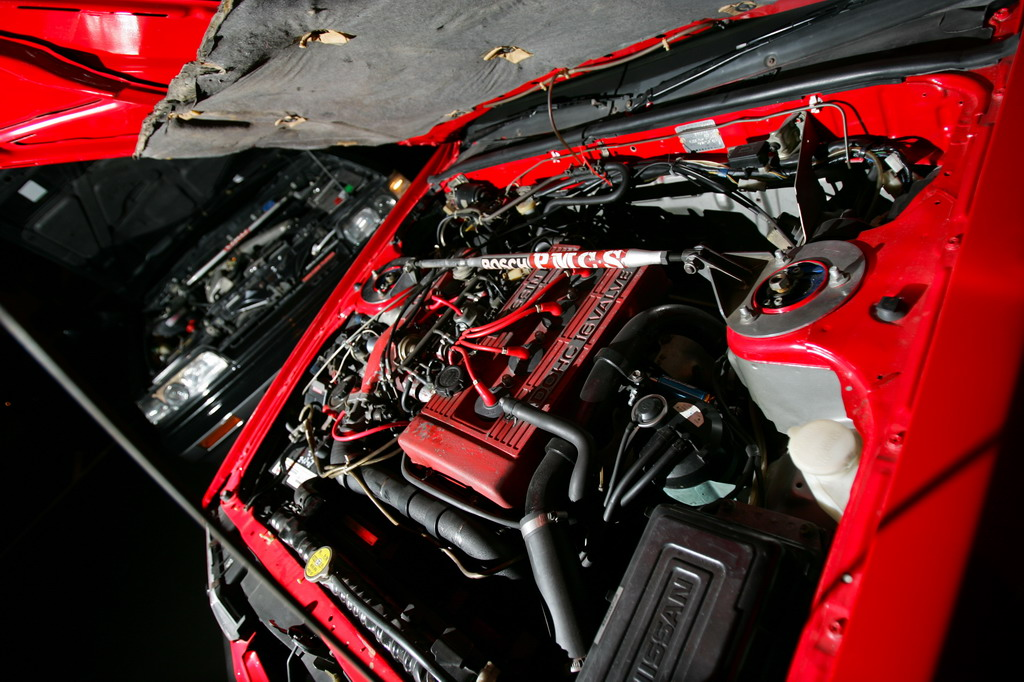
FJ20ET engine in a R30 Skyline

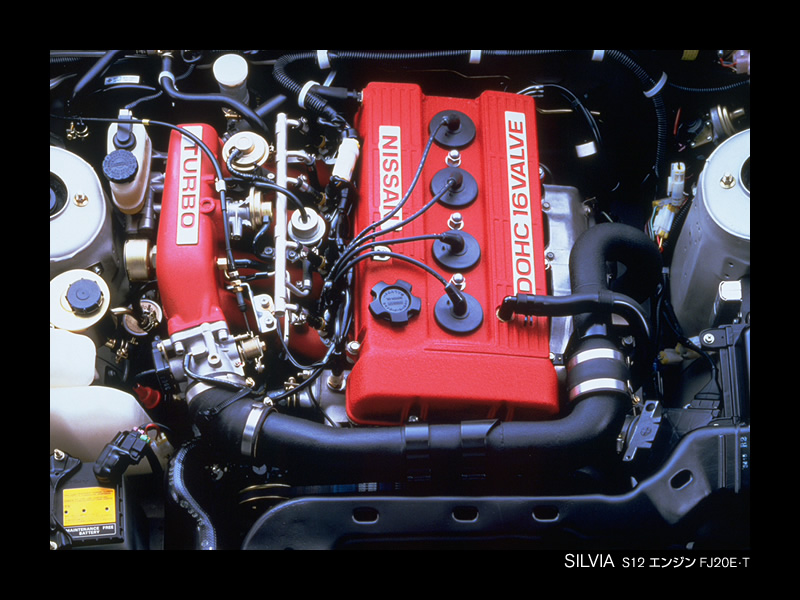
FJ20ET engine in a RSX S12 Silvia

Distinguished by the "E" for electronic fuel injection, with "T" standing for a turbocharged engine. Maximum output was 190 PS (140 kW) in the R30, and 185 PS (136 kW) in the S12. Boost pressure to achieve this power output was only 6–7 psi (0.41–0.48 bar). Later intercooled versions produced 205 PS (151 kW) with a slight boost increase and smaller turbocharger exhaust housing.

The FJ20ET was installed in the DR30 Skyline RS/RS-X/RS-X Turbo C and S12 Gazelle/Silvia RS-X; Turbo C versions of the DR30 were intercooled, as well as some S12 RS-X trim cars. The intake plenum chamber was shortened in the S12 compared with the DR30 because of the smaller engine bay and thus produced slightly less torque and power. However, the DR30 intake plenum can be fitted to the S12 engine bay with very little clearance. The DR30 FJ20ET also featured a twin scroll exhaust manifold, while the S12 received a smaller log-style turbo manifold due to lack of firewall clearance.

== FJ24 ==
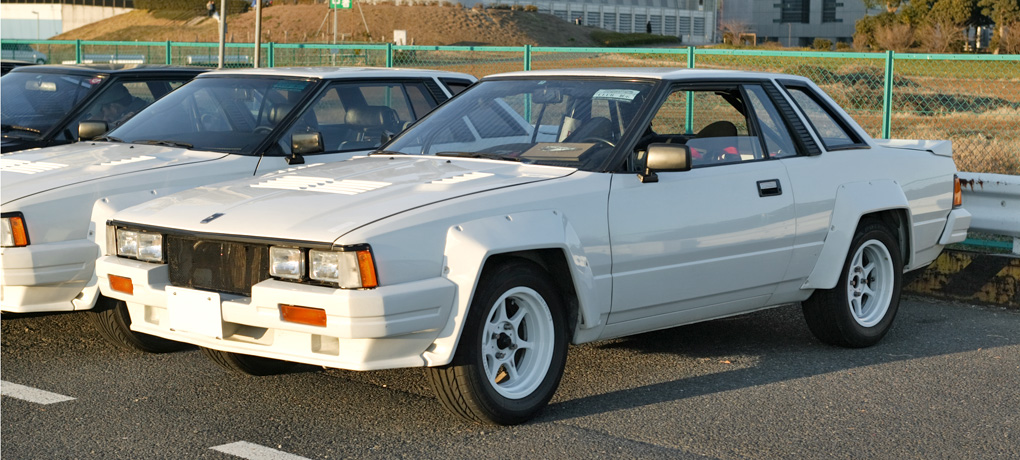
Nissan 240RS

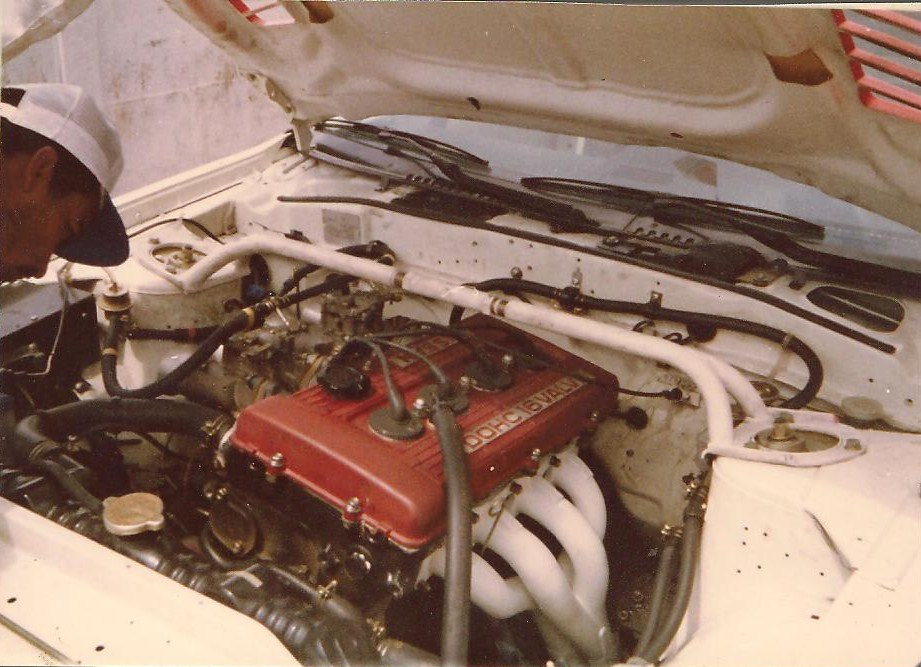
FJ24 engine in a 240RS

200 or more were produced as a homologation car engine of World Rally Championship at that time according to the Group B regulation. Displacement was expanded to 2.3 L (2,340 cc), though it was carbureted. The FJ24 was installed in the Nissan 240RS based on the S110 model Silvia. Among 200 total production number, 50 were right-hand drive (RHD), and 150 were left-hand drive, and obtained the Group B recognition of the WRC. 30 were used for the domestic rally championship in the WRC and each country from among the original 200. The number of sales in Japan is uncertain because there was no detailed record, though a small number of people bought the original rally cars. Therefore, development was not done in consideration of domestic exhaust emissions regulations.

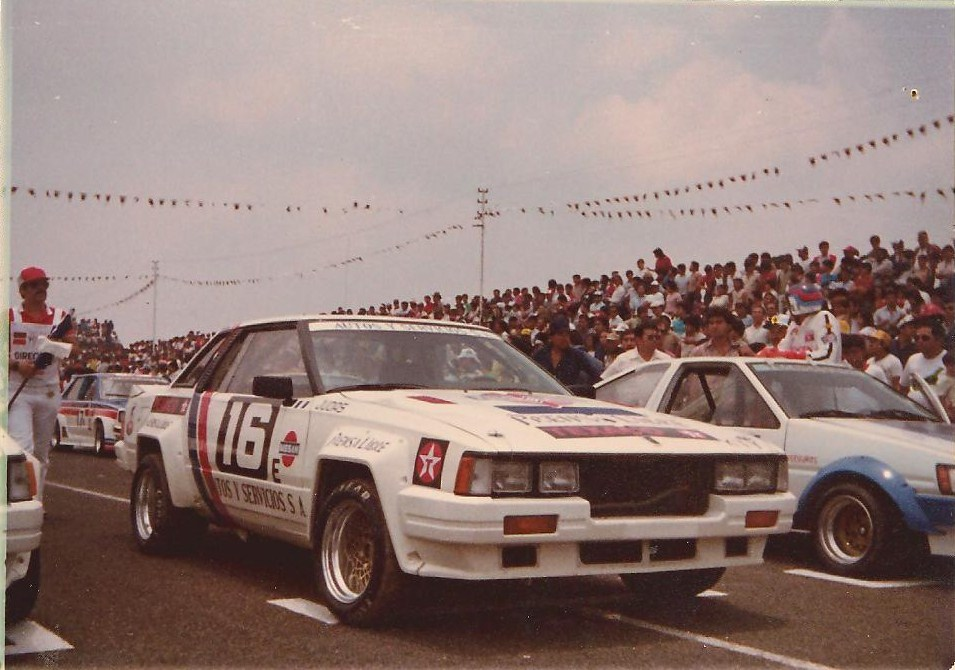
Guatemalan 240RS as rallied by Fernando Ibargüen

Three 240RSs came to Guatemala. Their code numbers were 33D, 16E and 77. They were raced in the Guatemalan and Central American Championships in 1985 and 1986.

== See also ==
- Nissan Skyline
- List of Nissan engines
