= Amelia Biagioni =

Argentine poet

Amelia Biagioni (1916, Gálvez, Santa Fe – 2000, Buenos Aires) was an Argentine poet. She published six books of poetry between 1954 and 1995.

== Work ==
- Sonata de Soledad (1954)
- La Llave (1957)
- El Humo (1967)
- Las Cacerias (1976)
- Estaciones de Van Gogh (1984)
- Región de Fuegas (1995)

Her posthumous poem, "Episodios de un viaje venidero", was published in La Nación newspaper days after her death.

== Partial bibliography ==
- Sonata de soledad. Santa Fe, Argentina: Castellví S.A., 1954.
- La Llave. Buenos Aires, Argentina: Emecé, 1957.
- The Hunts. Grand Terrace, CA: Xenos Books, 2003, ISBN 1-879378-44-2 .
