= Nissan 180SX =

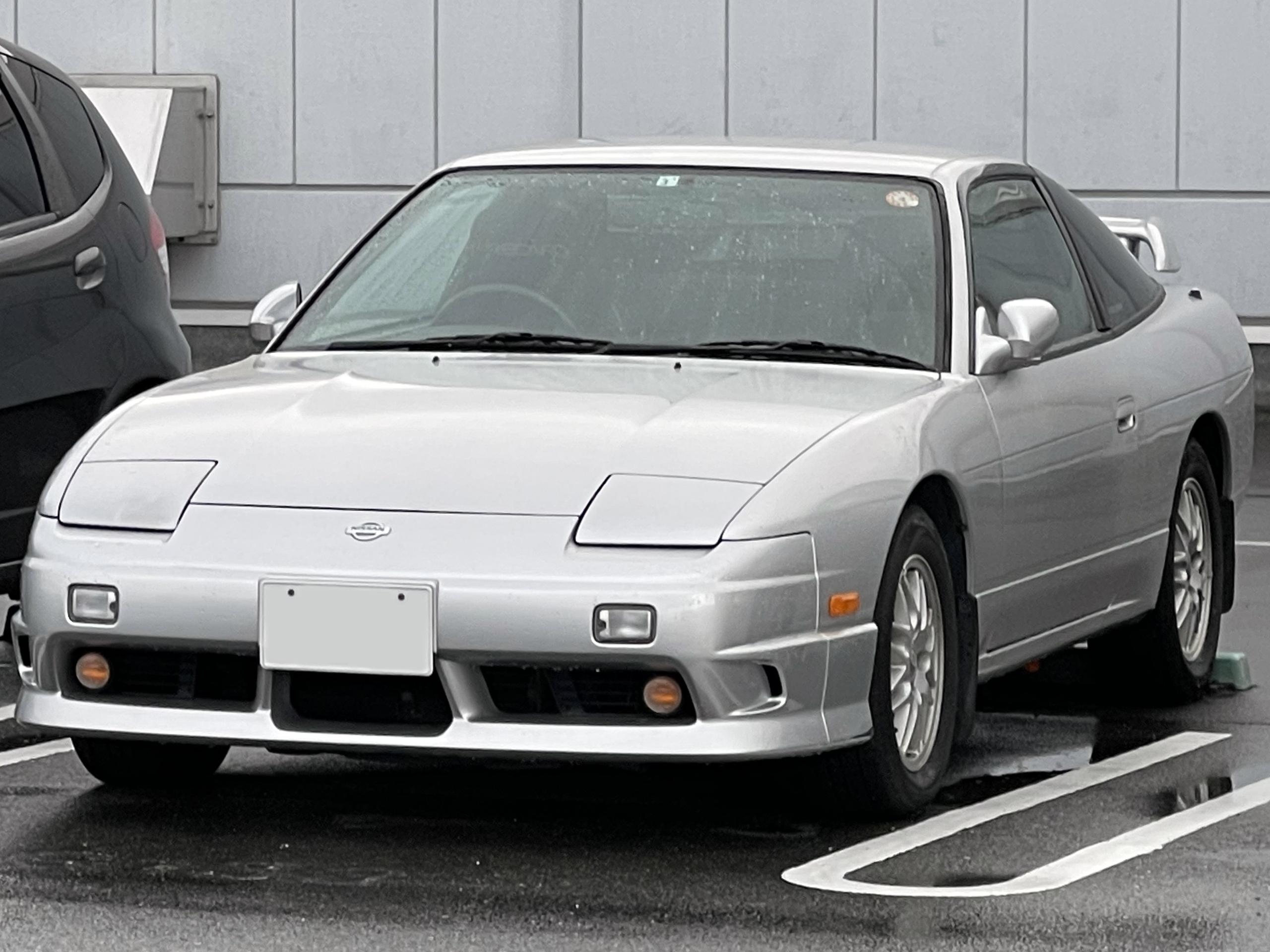
- Nissan 180SX Type X (RPS13) in Japan

Overview
- Manufacturer: Nissan
- Also called: Nissan 200SX
- Production: March 1989 – December 1998

Body and chassis
- Class: Sports car
- Body style: 3-door fastback
- Layout: FR
- Platform: S13
- Related: Nissan Silvia (S13); Nissan 240SX

Powertrain
- Engine: 1.8 L CA18DET turbo I4 (RS13); 2.0 L SR20DE I4 (RPS13); 2.0 L SR20DET I4 Turbo (RPS13)
- Transmission: 5-speed manual 4-speed automatic

Dimensions
- Wheelbase: 2,475 mm (97 in)
- Length: 4,520 mm (178 in) (1996–1999); 4,540 mm (179 in) (1989–1996)
- Width: 1,690 mm (67 in)
- Height: 1,290 mm (51 in)
- Curb weight: 1,170–1,270 kg (2,579–2,800 lb)

Chronology
- Predecessor: Nissan Gazelle S12
- Successor: Nissan Silvia S14

The Nissan 180SX is a fastback automobile that Nissan Motors produced between 1988 and 1998. It is based on the S13 chassis from the Nissan S platform with the variants receiving an R designation (e.g. RS13 and RPS13). It was sold exclusively in Japan. It was re-badged outside of Japan as the 200SX and as the 240SX in the US market.

== Model nomenclature and markets ==
The 180SX was built and sold by Nissan as a sister model to the S13 Silvia sold from model years 1989 through 1998, albeit at two different Japanese Nissan dealerships. The Silvia was sold at Nissan Prince Store, and the 180SX was sold at Nissan Bluebird Store locations. In Japan, the 180SX replaced the Gazelle. The S13 Silvia was discontinued in 1993, but the 180SX successfully convinced Nissan to keep it in the market for the full length of the next generation Silvia (S14). The 180SX differed from the S13 Silvia in that it featured pop-up headlights and a liftgate with different body work at the rear of the car. Specifications and equipment were similar, including the use of a turbocharged CA18DET engine; however, the naturally aspirated CA18DE engine was not offered.

The name 180SX was originally in reference to the 1.8 liter displacement CA18DET engine used in its chassis. In 1991, however, the engine was upgraded to a 2.0 liter model, offered in two forms: the turbocharged SR20DET variant and the naturally aspirated SR20DE engine, the latter of which was introduced in 1996. Although the new engine was of larger displacement, the 180SX nomenclature remained. 180SX was also a trim level of the S110 Silvia in Europe. The badges for this model read "Silvia 180SX", so this car is not properly a 180SX by model, but a version of the Silvia instead. Other discrepancies from this standard were distributed to Micronesia and South Pacific islands, including LHD cars with 180SX badges and non-retractable headlamps.

Like the Japanese 180SX SR20DET discrepancy, European, as well as South African models of the S13 chassis were called 200SX though equipped with the CA18DET engine, producing 169 PS (124 kW; 167 hp). This allowed the 200SX to reach 100 km/h (62 mph) in 7.5 seconds and onto 220 km/h. The car had a facelift in 1991 with new smoother bumpers, limited-slip differential, and larger brakes. This 200SX was sold between 1989 and 1994 until the change to the succeeding S14 version.

In North America, It was sold as the 240SX, paired with the single-overhead cam KA24E motor and later the dual-overhead cam KA24DE motor along with various other trim differences. The 240SX also offered coupé and convertible body styles that resemble the S13 Silvia from the rear portion of the car.

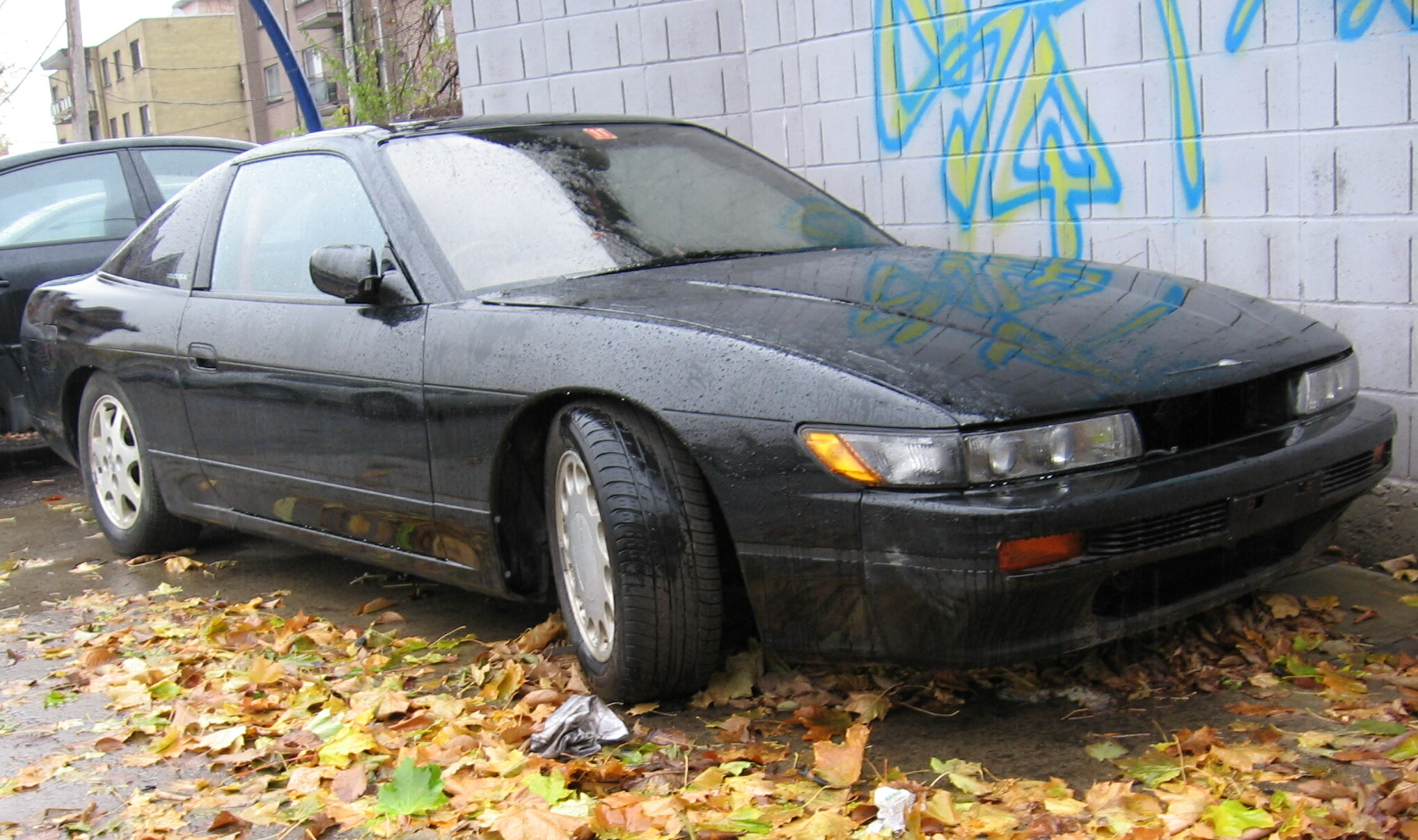
An unofficial Sileighty

Japanese tuning company Kid's Heart produced 500 units of an official 180SX and Silvia hybrid known as the Sileighty. These cars were built upon the standard 1998 180SX platform but had the headlamps, front wings, hood, front bumper and fixings from an S13 Silvia swapped over. These cars were available with either the naturally aspirated or the turbo engine, with the same 140 or 205 PS (103 or 151 kW) as a standard S13. A five-speed manual or a four-speed automatic were available. Kid's Heart also offered some mechanical and tuning upgrades, including a revised suspension, an improved limited-slip differential and an ECU tune from Nismo. This raised the turbo car's output to 230 PS (169 kW) at 13 psi of boost (0.9 bar). The Sileighty was also a common modification for 180SX (and even 200SX/240SX) owners, who swapped out the front ends of the 180SX with that of the S13 Silvia.

== 180SX generations ==
The 180SX came in three major generations: the first one was released in March 1989 up to January 1991, the second was from January 1991 to August 1996, and the third and final one from August 1996 to December 1998.

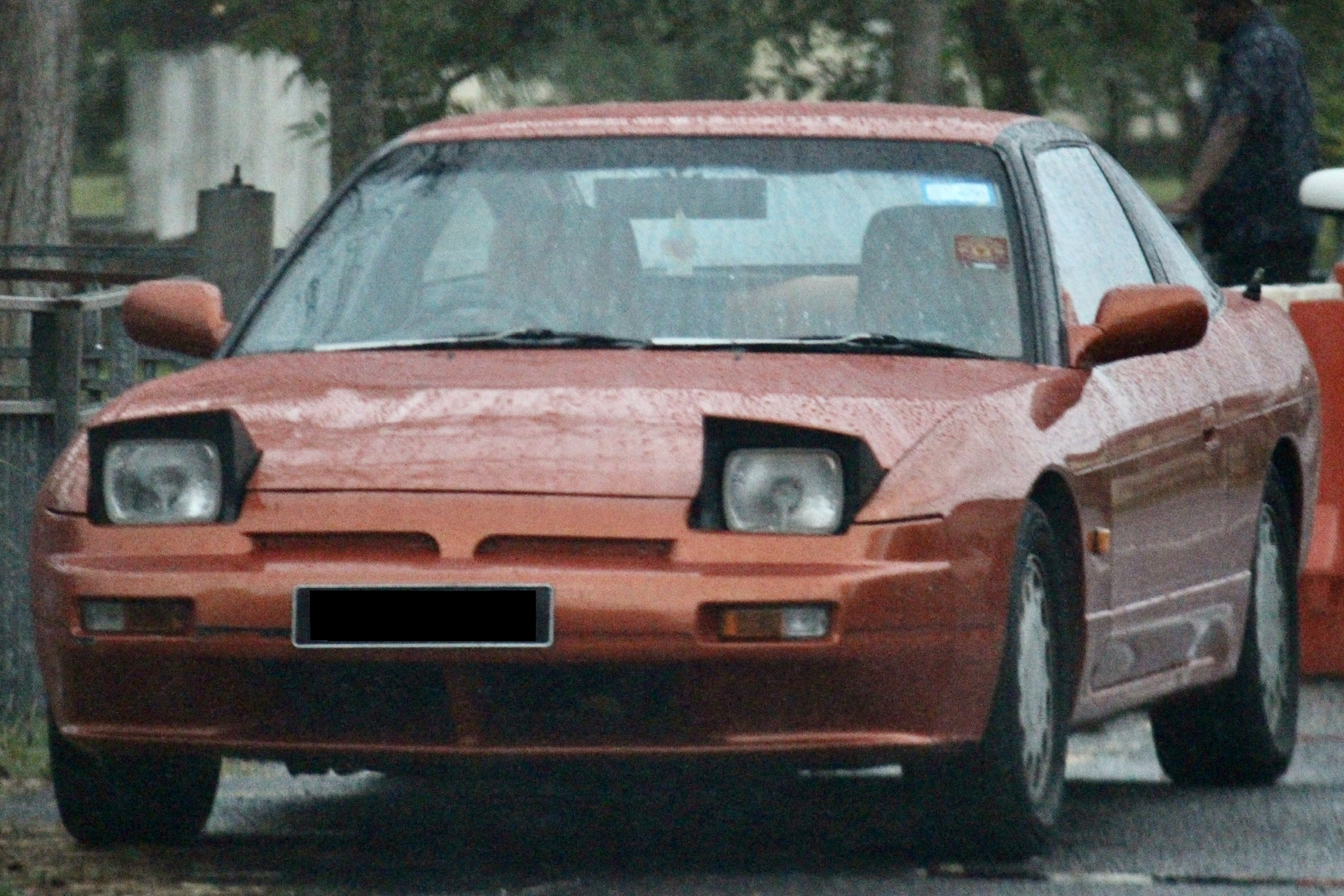
Pre-facelift model 180SX

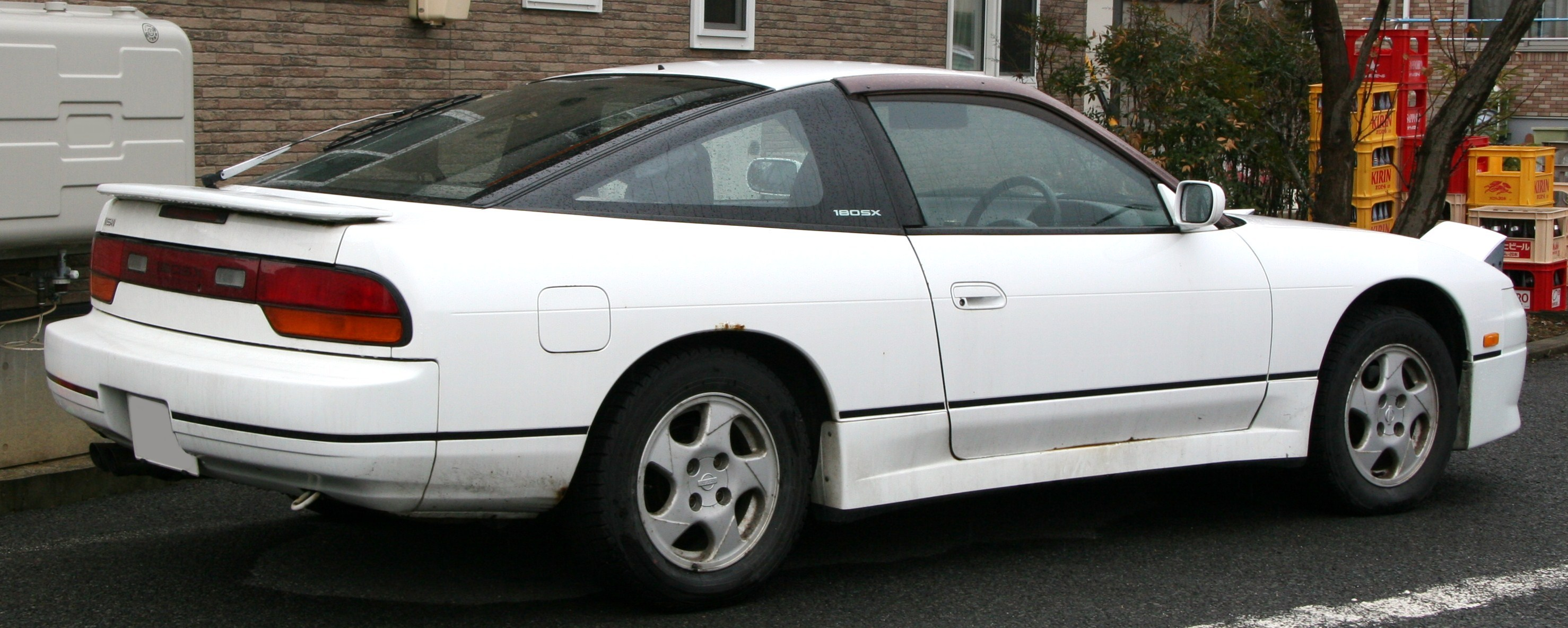
1989–1996 taillights

The first iteration of the 180SX was released in March 1989 and came in two versions called Type I (standard type) and Type II (advanced type). Nissan's HICAS II four wheel steering system was optional only on the Type II 180SX. All versions had the CA18DET engine with 175 PS. The 5-speed manual and 4-speed automatic transmissions were available in all types. HICAS-equipped cars have a leading K in their model code; thus the RS13 became KRS13 when equipped with HICAS.

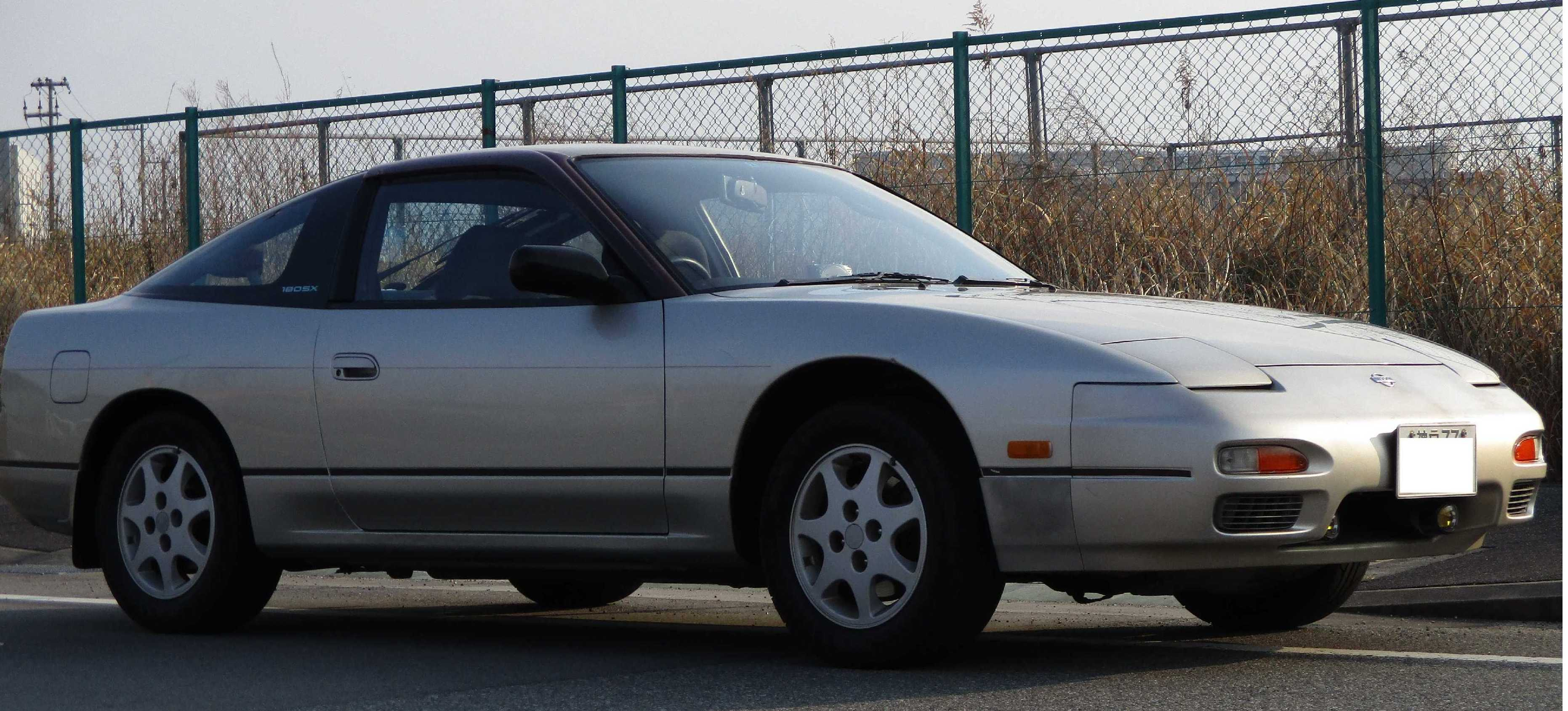
First facelift model 180SX

The second iteration 180SX was released in January 1991 and included several major changes from the first model. This included the SR20DET engine with 205 PS. Although the engine was larger than the previous CA18DET engine, the '180SX' nomenclature remained. The brakes were enlarged and limited-slip differential was added. The front bumper and parts of the interior were also redesigned. Type I and Type II were once again offered with only trim differences separating the two. The 15-inch alloy wheels also changed in design from the first model. Nissan's Super HICAS four-wheel steering was an option on all models as were 5-speed manual and 4-speed automatic transmissions.

The second iteration was facelifted in January 1991. Although the car largely remained visually and mechanically unchanged, an additional trim level called Type III was added. Electronic climate control and CD audio were also added as options. An additional facelift was performed in 1994, with the trim levels being renamed to Type R and Type X, with Type X being the highest level model. Again, the car remained virtually unchanged. The final facelift of the second iteration came in August 1996 with the addition of a driver-side airbag and a change of alloy wheels amongst other minor details.

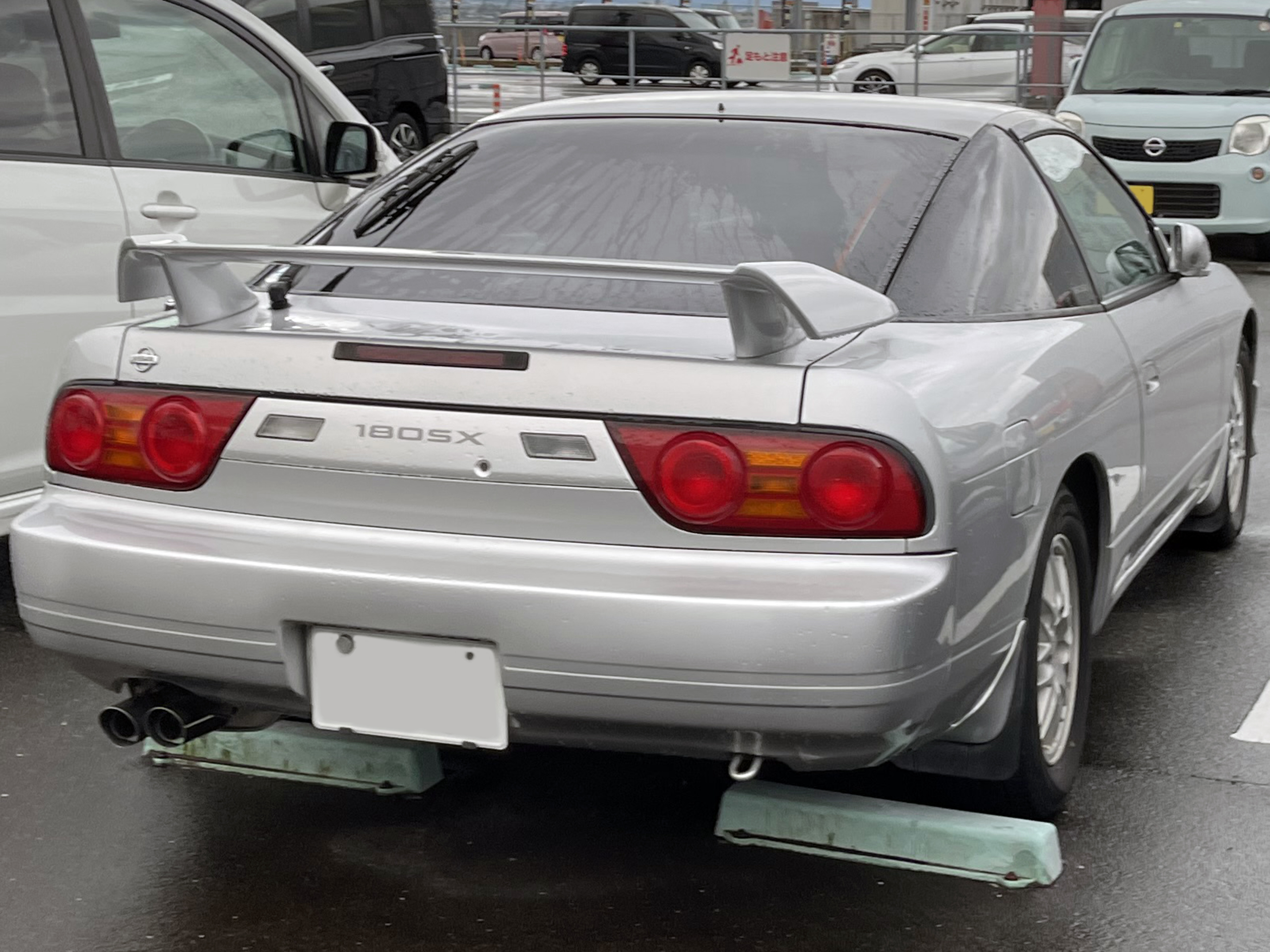
1996–1998 taillights

The third and final iteration was released in August 1996. It had a revised front bumper, tail lights, 15-inch wheels and interior. The mechanical and safety package received minor changes, such as the addition of a driver-side airbag, seat belt pre-tensioners, and some changes in the wiring and ECU. Three levels of 180SX were offered: Type X, Type S and Type R; the Type S being the first 180SX to be offered without a turbocharged engine. An additional trim level of the 180SX offered later in this iteration of the 180SX was called the Type G, which is another 180SX model that does not have a turbocharged engine.

The Type X and Type R both shared the same 205 PS (202 hp) engine and overall mechanical package however the Type R lacked many of the cosmetic additions of the Type X such as the front lip, rear spoiler, side skirts, rear valence and 15-inch alloy wheels. The Type S and Type G was powered by a naturally aspirated SR20DE engine with 140 PS, but was similar in mechanical and cosmetic details to the top of the range Type X. The Type S however did not have the option of Nissan's Super HICAS four-wheel steering system like the turbocharged models did.

The Type X and Type R ceased production in October 1998, however the Type S and Type G continued production until December 1998, when all 180SX production ceased.

== RS13U ==
Nissan 200SX (RS13U)
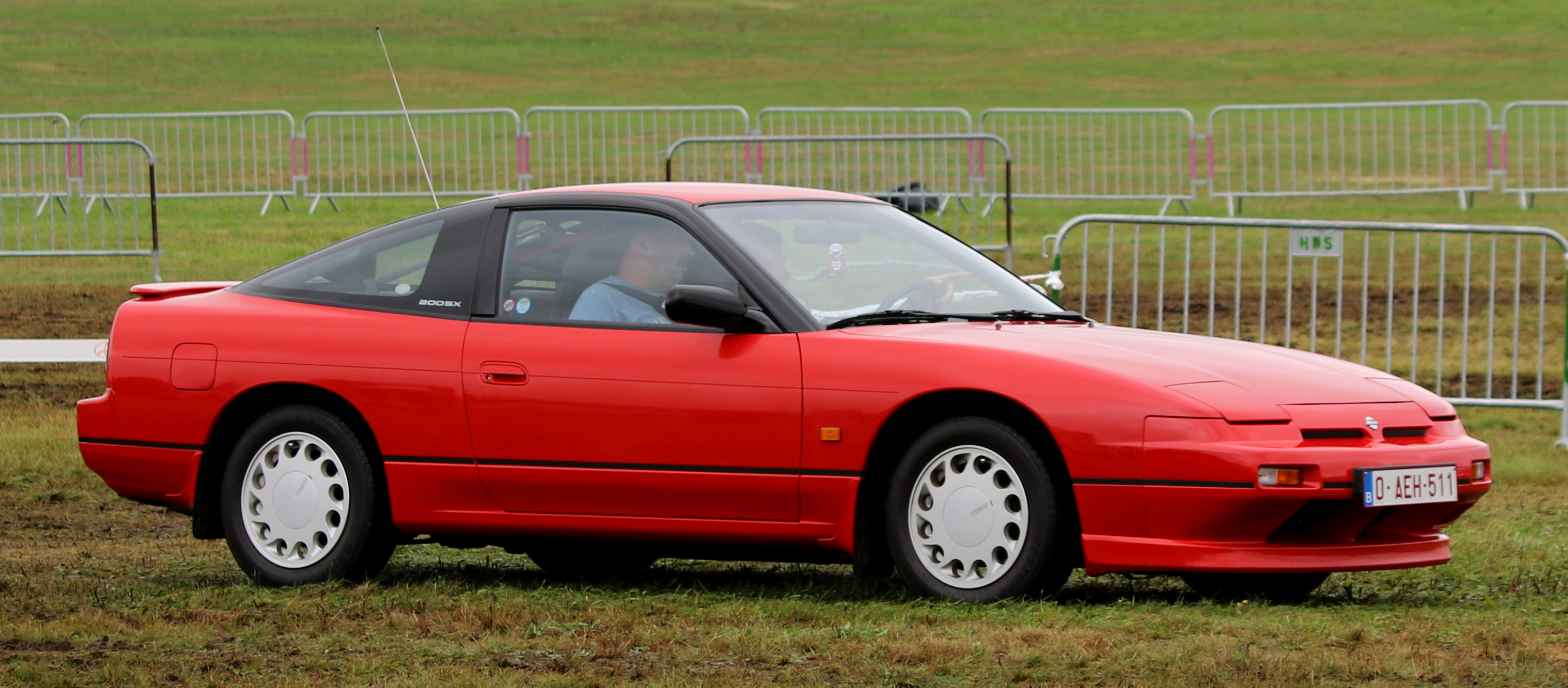
- Nissan 200SX (RS13U) in Belgium

Overview
- Also called: Nissan 180SX (Japan)
- Production: December 1988–December 1993 (prototypes from Jan '93)

Body and chassis
- Body style: 3-door fastback
- Platform: Nissan S platform
- Related: Nissan 240SX

Powertrain
- Engine: 1.8 L CA18DET I4 Turbo
- Transmission: 4-speed automatic 5-speed manual

Dimensions
- Wheelbase: 2475 mm (97.4 in)
- Length: 4520 mm (178 in)
- Width: 1690 mm (66.5 in)
- Height: 1290 mm (50.8 in)
- Curb weight: 1224 kg (2700 lb) (Automatic with air conditioning)

The RS13U 200SX is a fastback 3-door hatchback with a body shell like the Japanese market 180SX. The notchback coupe version was never offered in the European market - though a number of Japanese market S13 Silvias have been imported privately. Like its predecessor the Nissan Silvia (R)S12 in the European market it used pop-up headlights. The RS13U 200SX was made until December 1993 but sales continued from stocks in the UK until the end of 1994. For a few months both 200SX S14 and RS13U were available.

The RS13U 200SX were all powered by the CA18DET engines carried over from the end of S12 RS-X production, with an intercooler added to the CA18DET for a slight increase in stability and power. Despite its name, the SR20DET engine was never offered in Europe as it would have needed new European-type tests and regulations.

The chassis with MacPherson strut front and multilink rear suspension was common to all S13 and RS13 models. The European 200SX initially had 257 mm front brakes and rear disc service brakes with drum parking brakes in the rotor hubs. Later models had larger 280 mm front brakes.

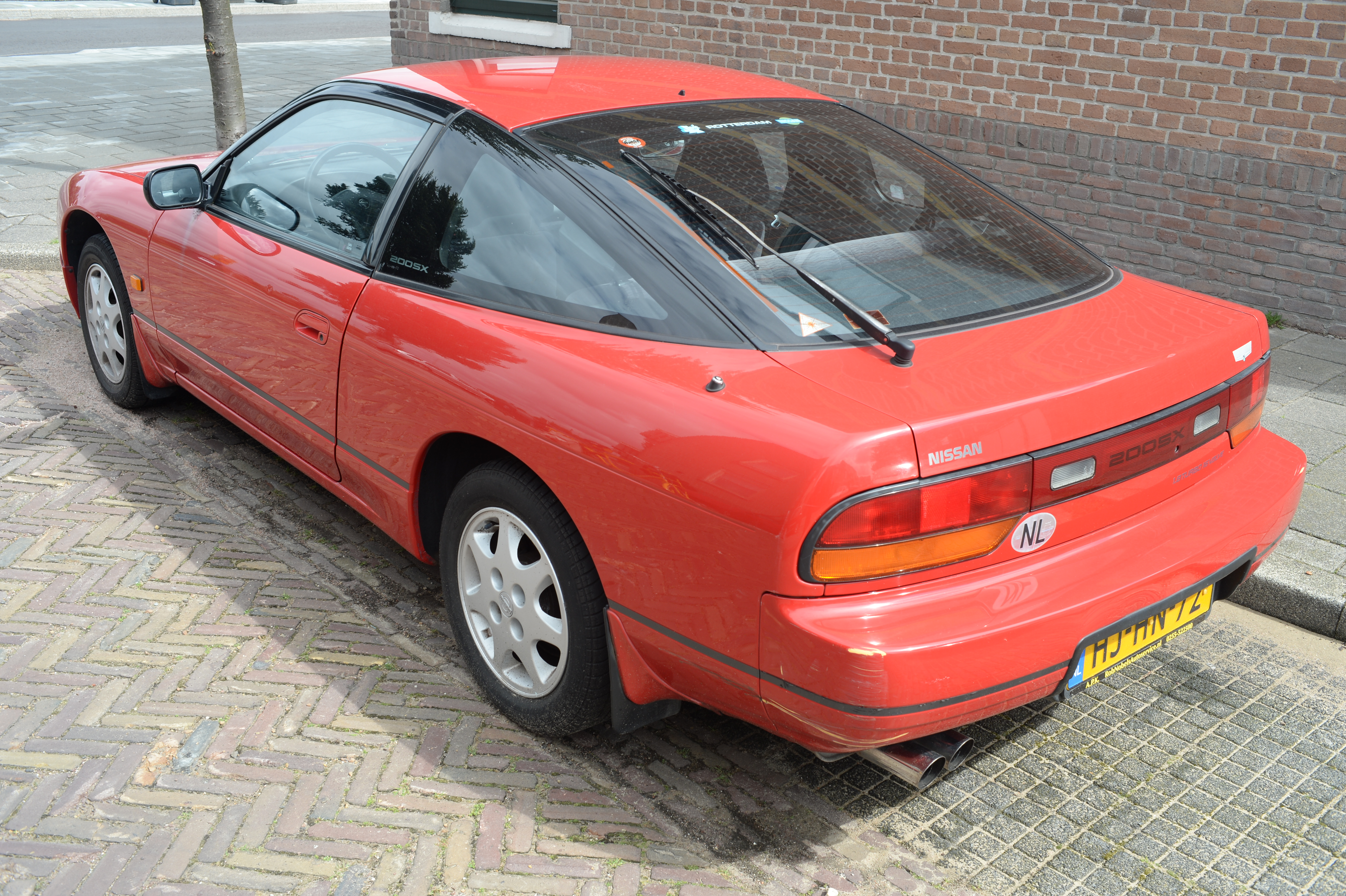
Nissan 200SX Turbo (S13) in the Netherlands

The European 200SX RS13U had a number of parts as standard that were Nismo optional parts in Japan. Water/oil heat exchanger. Differential oil cooler AND extended finned rear cover holding 0.6 litres more oil, even on models with open differential. Alloy radiator. 3.916 final drive ratio. These were required as the RS13U 200SX has no speed limiter and any car in Europe could visit West Germany where on the Autobahn it could legally be held at very high speeds for a sustained length of time. Japanese cars are fitted with a 180 km/h (112 mph) speed limiter.

Digital climate control was not fitted to European models. HICAS rear wheel steering wasn't available, nor was the later Japanese model's sports automatic gearbox control.

The FS5W71C gearboxes had different ratios to all other S13/S14. A key change was the layshaft gear which changed from 22/31 to 21/32, thus running the layshaft slower and at higher torque. This gearbox is considered weaker than other S13/S14 gearboxes. The front of the SR20DET gearbox with bell housing can be removed and a CA18DET bell housing fitted to allow the gearboxes to be swapped.

=== Trim level designation ===
==== UK ====
For the UK there were various trim levels but it never used GL/SL etc. that other Nissan models used. The early models had highback sports style seats with a fixed headrest. The seats, door cards and glove box were fabric in a blue and brown stripe/flecked pattern. It had 13-hole "tear drop" alloy wheels, which gave a lower drag coefficient than later 7-spoke wheels. The carpets were a short loop pile in grey. A spoiler was fitted on the back of the hatch, this has an overhang to the rear.

On the introduction of the smooth bumper facelift Nissan also offered the "200SX Executive". This doesn't appear on the car at all but only on the UK vehicle Log Book. The Executive was a locally enhanced specification produced by the UK importer AFG. At launch and as tested by the press it initially had limited-slip differential, leather seats (high back seats re-trimmed in UK), leather-trimmed steering wheel and gear knob, headlamp washers, air conditioning, sunroof and a multi change CD player in the boot. Some cars that were sold as Executive arrived without sunroof so a local accessory sunroof was fitted during the upgrade. It very quickly lost the CD player and the leather seats for low back seats with adjustable head rests. During the period that the Executive was sold the base model was downgraded to steel wheels. As most cars with steel wheels have had alloy wheels fitted and the grey waffle fabric trim on seats and doors was common, it's no longer easy to tell an Executive from a base model and the log book must be checked. The cabin carpet was now a long "cut" pile in a pale blue. When the Executive was discontinued all 200SX got the 7-spoke alloy wheels.

Late model UK cars produced from June '93 and mainly sold in 1994 had a much higher trim level, often confused with the Executive. They had low back grey Leather seats, a slot CD player / radio and 3 CD storage drawers in the space below. The CD player also required use of a separate amplifier mounted under the CD player. The door and glove box trim was a suede like pale blue/grey Alcantara. The last European spec 200SX was made in Dec '93. Sales in the UK continued throughout '94.

==== West Germany ====
In West Germany, the Nissan 200SX was equipped with a solenoid operated variable pressure windscreen wiper, which increased the pressure on the wiper blades at speeds over 120 km/h (75 mph). This helped prevent the blades from lifting off the screen at the high speeds expected on the Autobahn. In 1989, additional features were added to the Nissan 180SX in West Germany, including a low back seat, headlamp aiming control, and a limited-slip differential became standard fitment.

== Specifications ==
=== Engine ===
	CA18DET	SR20DE	SR20DET
Aspiration	Single Turbo	Naturally Aspirated	Single Turbo
Valvetrain	DOHC 16 valve		
Cylinders	4		
Displacement	1809cc	1998cc	
Max Power	175 PS (129 kW; 173 hp) at 6400 rpm	140 PS (103 kW; 138 hp) at 6400 rpm	205 PS (151 kW; 202 hp) at 6000 rpm
Max Torque	225 N⋅m (166 lbf⋅ft) at 4000 rpm	178 N⋅m (131 lbf⋅ft) at 4800 rpm	274 N⋅m (202 lbf⋅ft) at 4000 rpm
Drivetrain	Rear wheel drive		
Transmission	4-speed automatic/5-speed manual		

=== Performance ===
	CA18DET	SR20DE	SR20DET
0–100 km/h (0–62 mph)	6.9s (Manual); 7.5s (Automatic); (Europe)	7.7s	6.5s
0–400 m (0–1,312 ft)	14.9s (Best Motoring Tests)	17s	14.5s
Max speed	180 km/h (110 mph) (electronically limited); 235 km/h (146 mph) (Europe)		

=== Suspension ===
- Front: MacPherson strut
- Rear: Multi-link

Engine	Transmission	1st	2nd	3rd	4th	5th	Final
CA18DET	Automatic	3.027	1.619	1.000	0.694	—N/a	4.363
CA18DET	Manual	3.321	1.902	1.308	1.000	0.838	4.363
CA18DET	Manual (Europe)	3.592	2.057	1.361	1.000	0.821	3.916
SR20DE	Manual	3.321	1.902	1.308	1.000	0.838	4.111 (S13); 4.083 (S14/S15)
SR20DET	Automatic	2.785	1.545	1.000	0.694	—N/a	3.916
SR20DET	Manual	3.321	1.902	1.308	1.000	0.759	4.083

== Motorsports ==
=== Drifting ===
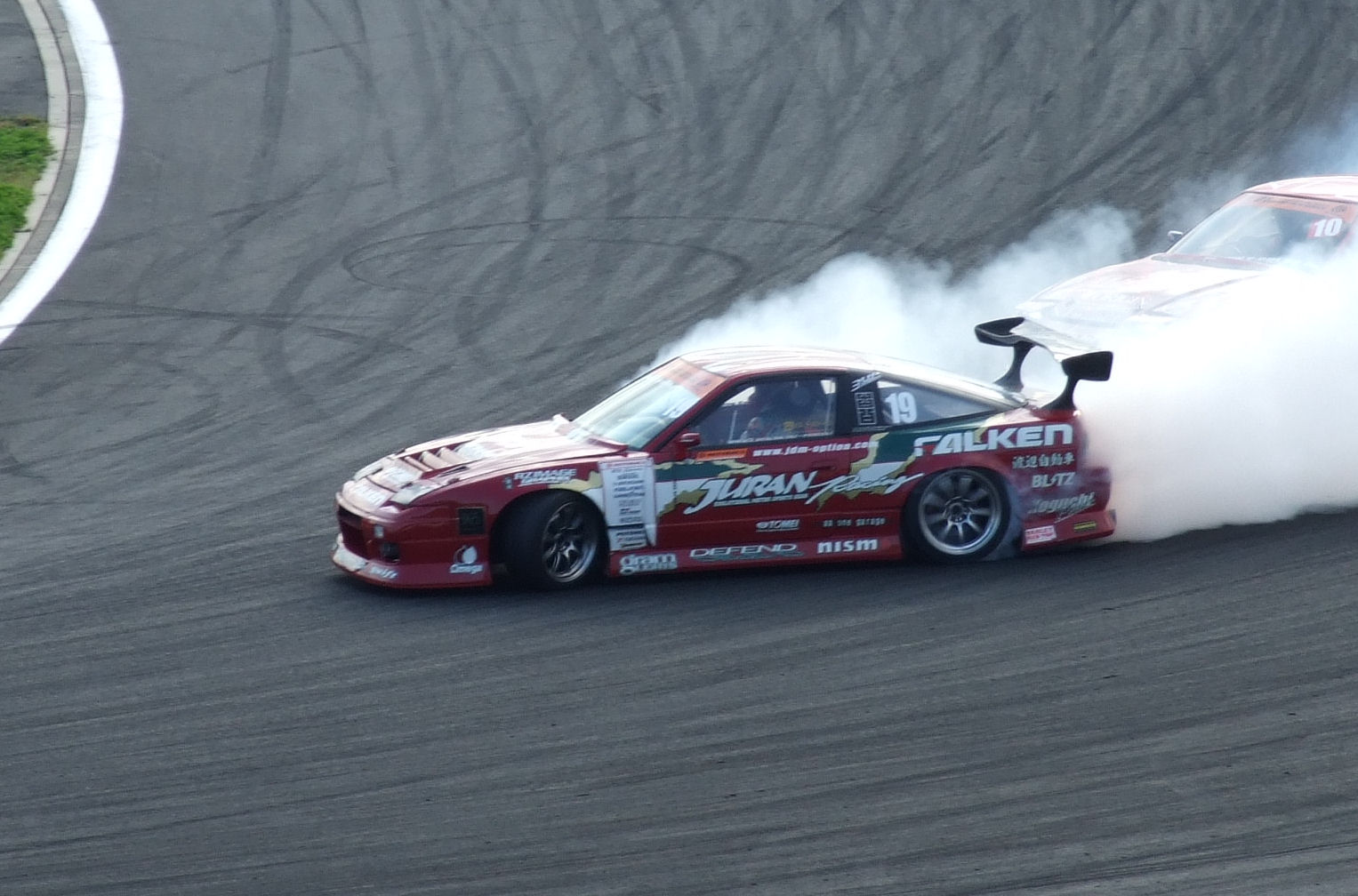
Yoshinori Koguchi drifting a Nissan 180SX at D1 Grand Prix competition at Fuji Speedway in late-2007

Like other S platform cars, the 180SX is popular as a drift car. The car is a frequent entrant at the D1 Grand Prix and was used in Masato Kawabata's 2013 championship victory. Kazuya Matsukawa also won the 2007 Street Legal category with a 180SX.

== Related vehicles ==
The 180SX is one of the cars based on the Nissan S platform.

The S13 platform also includes:

- Silvia - The first S13 based production car. Different body with no liftgate.
- 240SX - North American version of the 180SX. Left hand drive with a 2.4L NA engine (KA24E and KA24DE).
- 200SX - Name given to the 180SX in Europe. Left or right hand drive with a 1.8L Turbo engine (CA18DET). This name was also given to the S14 and S15 series Silvia on the Australian market.
