= Phil Morrison (driver) =

British racing driver (born 1977)

- Born: 1 June 1977 (age 48)
- Nationality: Great Britain

British Drift Championship career
- Current team: Driftworks

Championship titles
- 2006 2010: D1 Great Britain; British Drift Championship

Philip John Morrison (born 1 June 1977) is a professional drift driver and entrepreneur from Birmingham, England. He is one of the most successful drivers in UK drifting, having won the 2006 D1 Great Britain series and 2010 British Drift Championship and is co-owner of automotive parts company Driftworks.

== Drifting career ==
Morrison started drifting the early 2000s, funding his interest in the sport by working for five years in a sixth form college as a technician. In 2006, Morrison won the D1 Great Britain Series in a Nissan 200SX S14. In 2008, Morrison debuted a new car, a front mid-engined Nissan Silvia S15 powered by a 2JZ-GTE engine from a Toyota Supra in the European Drift Championship. He narrowly missed out on the 2009 EDC title, after spinning out in the top-eight in the final round at Snetterton and handed the title to Mark Luney. The following season, Morrison won the 2010 British Drift Championship title at Knockhill.

The S15 was sold at the end of the 2012 BDC season, to be replaced by a world first LSx powered Toyota AE86, built with the remnants of an ASCAR race car.

== Business career ==
Morrison is the co-owner of Driftworks Ltd, alongside his business partner, James Robinson. The business was established out of a spare room in Morrison's home, originally to source quality parts from Japan for their drift cars, and has now grown into one of the largest suppliers of aftermarket car parts in the UK, offering worldwide service, based out of a 12,000 sq ft facility in Tyseley, Birmingham.

Alongside his main business, Morrison also runs the Driftworks YouTube channel, where he documents the work undertaken on his own cars, such as resolving issues, performance upgrades and bodywork changes. The channel description states that their goal is to engineer wild-looking and -sounding cars that actually work and have fun whilst doing so. As of July 2024, they have amassed more than 41 million views and 210,000 subscribers.

Driftworks currently sponsors the following professional drivers:

- Tessa Whittock
- Martin Richards
