= Steve Biagioni =

British drift driver

Steve Baggsy Biagioni
- Nationality: United Kingdom
- Born: 12 June 1987 (age 39)

British Drift Championship career
- Current team: SB Motorsport

Championship titles
- 2009: British Drift Championship King of Kings Champion

Steve "Baggsy" Biagioni is a professional drift driver from Essex, United Kingdom who won the British Drift Championship in 2009.

Biagioni started drifting in a Volvo 340 and in 2008 began competing in the Semi Pro class of the British Drifting Championship in a Nissan 200SX S13. He finished sixth in the championship which allowed him promotion into the main Pro class, he then joined Team Japspeed and ended up winning the Pro championship outright in 2009.

Biagioni then switched to a rear wheel drive converted Subaru Impreza. The car was not competitive during the 2010 season, with many mechanical failures preventing Baggsy from qualifying. In 2011, the Subaru had a 1JZ engine transplant which helped the car become more competitive, with a second-place finish at the final round of the season. Steve's 1JZ-GTE powered Subaru made headlines in 2011 for all the wrong reasons when it was stolen while on display at Santa Pod Raceway. The drifting and general car community pitched in to find the car and within hours of the theft, videos were uploaded showing the car driving on the M1, the M25 and the M4 motorways. The car was recovered and the thieves were convicted with combined sentences of 15 years in prison.

During 2012, Biagioni was a regular podium finisher and ended up fifth in the final championship standings. In 2013, Biagioni left Team Japspeed and joined Acorn Motorsport Division, now back in a Nissan 200sx S13. His season got off to a bad start, with a major crash at Lydden Hill, causing extensive damage to the car.

Biagioni took first place, and was crowned 'King of Kings' in the 2014 European Super Final in Malta.

Biagioni is a Monster Energy athlete and features at Monster demonstrations across Europe. He featured in Idris Elba's 'King of Speed' show, teaching Idris how to drift in a Toyota GT86, and also in Idris Elba's 'No Limits' show, advising Idris on his land speed record attempt. The first series of Amazon Primes 'The Grand Tour' would see Baggsy teach Richard Hammond how to drift behind the wheel of Baggsy's LS3 V8 Nissan S13. He is also the owner of a 1200HP Nissan GTR that is powered by a chevrolet LSX 454 engine with a massive garret turbo.
