= European Drift Championship =

- Category: Drifting
- Country: United Kingdom
- Inaugural season: 2007
- Folded: 2012
- Last Drivers' champion: Paul Conlan

The European Drift Championship (EDC) was an annual drifting series held in the United Kingdom from 2007 to 2012. The series was previously known as D1 Great Britain (D1GB) in 2006 and D1UK from 2002 to 2005, but event organizers disassociated from the D1 Grand Prix in 2007. D1UK was also known as the Autoglym Drift Championship due to sponsorship by Autoglym.

In 2008, EDC introduced the British Drift Championship (BDC) as a feeder series, but the BDC broke off to form its own annual professional series just a year later and became aligned with Formula D.

In 2010 the championship organisers made the controversial move to change from a Top 16 to a Top 8 invitational format. The championship featured only 8 drivers who were all sponsored by Pirelli. All championship rounds became part of the Modified Live car shows alongside the UK Time Attack series.

At the end of the 2012 season, the championship folded due to drivers moving over to the British Drift Championship and Modified Live events now only feature drift demonstrations rather than full competitions.

== Past Champions ==
D1UK/Autoglym Drift Championship

Year	Driver	Car
2002	James Wolstenholme	
2003		
2004	Brett Castle	Nissan 200SX S14a
2005	Damien Mulvey	Nissan 200SX S13

D1 Great Britain

Year	Driver	Team	Car
2006	Phil Morrison	Driftworks	Nissan 200SX S14a

European Drift Championship

Year	Driver	Team	Car
2007	Brett Castle	Abbey Motorsport	Nissan 200SX S14a
2008	Ben Broke-Smith	Driftworks	Toyota Chaser JZX81
2009	Mark Luney	SVA Imports	Nissan 350Z
2010	Mark Luney	SVA Imports	Nissan 350Z
2011	Brett Castle	Sumo Power	Nissan Silvia S15
2012	Paul Conlan	BC Racing	Nissan Silvia S15
