= Drift Masters =

European auto racing series

- Category: Drifting
- Region: Europe
- Inaugural season: 2014
- Drivers: 36 (not including wild cards)
- Drivers' champion: (Poland) Paweł Korpuliński (2026)
- Teams' champion: (Republic of Ireland) Ireland
- Official website: dm.gp

Drift Masters often abbreviated as DM, DMGP or DMEC is a European drifting series established in 2014. It is widely considered the biggest drifting series in Europe and one of the biggest in the world.

After each season, the series awards a championship title to the driver and country with the most points scored. Since 2024, Rookie of The Year award is given to the driver who finished highest in his debut season.

== History ==
=== Drift Masters Grand Prix era ===
Drift Masters Grand Prix was established in 2014 by Dawid Karkosik and Tomasz Chwastek. The series was officially announced during a press conference held at the Marriott Hotel in Warsaw. Initially, it operated as a national Polish drift series, consisting of three rounds hosted at PGE Arena in Gdańsk, MotoArena Toruń, and a street circuit in Karpacz.

Prior to the inaugural season, a "Drivers Search" took place on 24–25 May 2014 at the Debrzno Aerodrome. It served as a qualification process to select the drivers who showed the most skills during the event. The total prize pool for the season was set at 120,000 Polish złoty, with 40,000 złoty distributed among the top five finishers at each round. Piotr Więcek won the first ever round defeating Bartosz Stolarski in the final.

In 2015 the series expanded to twelve rounds in six different locations, but in the end the round in Wałbrzych ended up getting cancelled.

Although the number of rounds in the 2016 season remained the same, the series included an international round for the first time. This round was held at the Biķernieki Sports Complex in Riga, Latvia. Polish driver Paweł Borkowski won the event, and earned the "King of Riga" title. For the first time, all rounds of the season, including qualifying sessions, were broadcast on television via the Polish sports channel nSport+.

In 2017, the Drift Masters Grand Prix series discontinued the double-header format used in previous seasons. Each venue hosted a single round, reducing the total number of rounds from twelve to six. The competition format was also revised, expanding the main competition from a Top 16 to a Top 32, allowing more drivers to qualify for the main event. The prize pool for each round was set at €40,000. The final round of the season took place at the Hockenheimring, a circuit that previously hosted Formula One races.

Adam Zalewski won the 2017 championship, becoming the first driver other than Piotr Więcek to claim the title. Więcek did not compete in the series that year, having joined the Formula Drift in the United States as part of the Worthouse Drift Team, alongside teammate James Deane.

=== Drift Masters European Championship era ===
In 2018, the series was rebranded as the Drift Masters European Championship (DMEC). The rebranding was an idea of Arkadiusz Dudko, who assumed the role of CEO following a strategic alignment with Zigen Promotions, the organization behind the Irish Drift Championship and British Drift Championship. Dave Egan, CEO of Zigen Promotions, later served as a commentator for the series, alongside Ian Waddington.

That same year, DMEC established a partnership with the American series Formula Drift. Formula Drift PRO licenses were awarded to the top eight DMEC drivers, while all Formula Drift drivers were awarded Drift Masters licenses.

James Deane became the first non-Polish driver to win the DMEC title, securing victories in five out of six rounds. He simultaneously claimed the 2018 Formula Drift championship, becoming the only driver to win both titles in the same season.

A partnership between Red Bull Media House and DMEC was announced in 2019. As part of the agreement, all championship rounds were broadcast live on Red Bull TV, featuring commentary in English, Polish, Turkish, and Arabic.

The 2020 season was initially planned to include six rounds throughout Europe. However, after the Austrian round was cancelled and the remaining events postponed due to the COVID-19 pandemic, the championship was ultimately cancelled in its entirety. A single standalone event, the DMEC King of Riga, took place as the sole competition of the season.

In 2021, even more scheduling challenges appeared due to the ongoing COVID-19 pandemic. Originally, five rounds were planned but only four events took place: two rounds at PS Racing Center in Greinbach, Austria, and two rounds at Biķernieki Trase in Riga, Latvia. The final round, scheduled for the center of Tbilisi, Georgia, was cancelled following the completion of the first four rounds.

The championship returned to a full six-round schedule in 2022, with no events cancelled during the season.

The series set a new world record for the largest attendance at a drifting event during 2023 season Round 6 at PGE Narodowy, with 55,000 spectators. This surpassed the previous record of 25,000 spectators, which was set by Formula Drift at Long Beach in 2019.

=== Drift Masters era ===
In 2024, the series underwent a rebranding that removed “European Championship” from its name, reflecting its intention to evolve into a global drifting series. The year also marked the 10th anniversary of the championship. In the same year, a qualifying showdown was introduced, in which the top four drivers from qualifying competed against each other to earn up to four additional points.

The series initially planned to hold seven rounds for the first time in its history in 2025; however, the first round scheduled at Vallelunga Circuit in Rome, Italy, was cancelled due to the death of Pope Francis. The 2025 season was the first since 2018 without Dave Egan as a commentator, as he chose to focus on his drifting career, becoming a full-time driver in the series. He was replaced by Formula Drift commentator Jacob Gettins.

The Qualifying Showdown was removed in 2026, with the series returning to a traditional qualifying format.

== Competition format ==
Each round begins with a qualifying session. Drivers get two runs and are judged by three judges based on three criteria. The judges can award up to 100 points for:

- Line 60/100
- Angle 20/100
- Style 20/100
  - Initiation 5/20
  - Fluidity 10/20
  - Commitment 5/20

The top eight drivers in the qualifying session receive points, with first place earning eight points and eighth place earning one point. Drivers placing 33rd and below are eliminated from the competition.

Drivers who progress through qualifying advance to tandem battles, competing head-to-head against other competitors. In each battle, one driver leads and must throw down a run similar to the one in qualifying, while the other aims to replicate the leader's actions. The roles are then reversed for the second run. After both runs, the judges decide which driver advances to the next stage. If no winner can be determined, the judges may call for a “One More Time” (OMT), requiring the drivers to repeat the battle. A maximum of one OMT may be ordered per battle.

The top four drivers advance to the Qualifying Showdown, where first place competes against fourth place, and second place competes against third place. The winners of these matchups advance to the final. The winner of the final is awarded four points, with each subsequent position receiving one point less.

The top 32 drivers from qualifying advance to the main competition, where matchups are determined by the place each driver took in qualifying. First-place qualifier faces the 32nd, the second faces the 31st, and so on. This stage is called Top 32. Drivers eliminated in this stage receive 16 points and classify 17th through 32nd. Winners advance to Top 16, where the losers receive 32 points and classify 9th through 16th. Those eliminated in Top 8 receive 48 points and classify 5th through 8th. The losers in Top 4 get to compete in a 3rd place battle. The fourth-place finisher receives 64 points, while third place earns 76 points.

The winners of Top 4 proceed to Final. The runner-up is awarded 88 points, and the winner receives 100 points.

In 2025, the three main judges are Mateusz Dziedzic, Vernon Zwaneveld, and David Kalas. The role of head judge rotates between them at each round.

The competition director is Maciej Polody.

== Tracks ==
No.	Tracks	Rounds	Years
1	(Latvia) Bikernieku Trase	13	2016–present
2	(Republic of Ireland) Mondello Park	7	2018–2019, 2022–present
3	(Poland) Kazimierz Górski Stadium	5	2015–2019
3	(Germany) Ferropolis	5	2019, 2022–2023, 2025-present
4	(Poland) Motoarena Toruń	4	2014–2015, 2017–2018
4	(Austria) PS Racing Center	4	2019, 2021–2022
4	(Poland) Stadion Narodowy	4	2023–present
5	(Poland) Tor Poznań	3	2015–2017
5	(Finland) PowerPark	3	2023–2025
6	(Germany) Hockenheimring	2	2017–2018
6	(Hungary) RabócsiRing Máriapócs	2	2018, 2024
6	(Spain) Circuito del Jarama	2	2025-present
6	(Sweden) Drivecenter Arena	2	2022–2023
7	(Poland) Karpacz	1	2014
7	(Poland) PGE Arena	1	2014
7	(Poland) Autodrom Jastrząb	1	2015
7	(Poland) INEA Stadion	1	2015
7	(Poland) AmberExpo, Gdańsk	1	2016
7	(Poland) Nadarzyn Expo	1	2016
7	(Germany) Nürburgring	1	2017
7	(France) Circuit de Croix-en-Ternois	1	2019
7	(Poland) Moto Arena Łódź	1	2022
7	(Spain) Circuit Ricardo Tormo	1	2024
7	(Italy) Vallelunga Circuit	1	~~2025~~-2026-
7	(Finland) Ahvenisto Race Circuit	1	2026-

== Records and statistics ==
=== Drift Masters champions ===
Drift Masters excludes data prior to 2018 in its official statistics.

Season	Driver	Car	Nations cup
2014	(Poland) Piotr Więcek	Nissan Skyline	
2015	(Poland) Piotr Więcek	Nissan 200SX	
2016	(Poland) Piotr Więcek	Nissan 200SX	
2017	(Poland) Adam Zalewski	BMW E30	
2018	(Republic of Ireland) James Deane	Nissan 200SX	(Republic of Ireland) Ireland
2019	(Republic of Ireland) James Deane	BMW E92	(Republic of Ireland) Ireland
2020	(Republic of Ireland) James Deane	BMW E92	not awarded
2021	(Poland) Piotr Więcek	Nissan S15	Poland
2022	(Poland) Piotr Więcek	Nissan S15	(Republic of Ireland) Poland
2023	(Republic of Ireland) Conor Shanahan	Toyota GT86	(Republic of Ireland) Ireland
2024	(Finland) Lauri Heinonen	Nissan 180SX	(Republic of Ireland) Ireland
2025	(Republic of Ireland) Conor Shanahan	Toyota GT86	(Republic of Ireland) Ireland
2026	(Poland) Paweł Korpuliński	Nissan 200SX	(Republic of Ireland) Ireland

=== Event wins ===
Wins by driver
	Driver	DMGP	DMEC/DM	Total
1	(Poland) Piotr Więcek	9	11	20
2	(Republic of Ireland) James Deane	4	7	11
3	(Republic of Ireland) Conor Shanahan	0	11	11
4	(Republic of Ireland) Jack Shanahan	0	5	5
5	(Poland) Adam Zalewski	3	0	3
5	(Poland) Grzegorz Hypki	2	1	3
5	(Poland) Dawid Karkosik	3	0	3
5	(Republic of Ireland) Duane McKeever	0	3	3
5	(Poland) Paweł Borkowski	2	1	3
6	(Finland) Lauri Heinonen	0	2	2
6	(Poland) Paweł Trela	2	0	2
6	(Poland) Paweł Korpuliński	0	2	2
7	(Poland) Bartosz Stolarski	1	0	1
7	(Estonia) Kevin Pesur	0	1	1
7	(Wales) Oliver Evans	0	1	1
7	(United Kingdom) Martin Richards	0	1	1
7	(Finland) Juha Rintanen	0	1	1
7	(Poland) Marcin Mospinek	1	0	1
7	(Poland) Jakub Przygoński	1	0	1
7	(Latvia) Janis Eglite	1	0	1
7	(Republic of Ireland) Nigel Colfer	1	0	1
7	(Estonia) Oliver Randalu	0	1	1

Driver wins by nationality
	Nation	DMGP	DMEC/DM	Total
1	Poland	24	15	39
2	(Republic of Ireland) Ireland	5	26	31
3	Finland	0	3	3
4	Estonia	0	2	2
5	(United Kingdom) Great Britain	0	1	1
5	Wales	0	1	1
5	Latvia	1	0	1

== See also ==
- D1 Grand Prix
- Formula Drift
- Drift Allstars
- British Drift Championship
- Russian Drift Series
