= 2025 Drift Masters season =

Car drifting competition season

The 2025 Drift Masters season is the eleventh full season of the Drift Masters series. The season began on May 17 at Circuito del Jarama and concluded on September 13 at PGE Narodowy custom built track after six events.

The first round in Italy was cancelled after the death of Pope Francis.

Conor Shanahan, driving his Toyota GT86, won his 2nd title. Ireland won their 4th Nations Cup in a row and 6th overall. Jarkko Jylhä won the Rookie Of The Year award finishing 15th overall.

== Schedule ==
Round	Circuit	Location	Date	Qualifying winner	Qualifying showdown winner	Winner	Car
1	Vallelunga Circuit	Campagnano di Roma, Italy	~~25–26 April~~	cancelled			
2	Circuito del Jarama	Madrid, Spain	17–18 May	(Poland) Piotr Więcek	(Poland) Piotr Więcek	(Estonia) Oliver Randalu	BMW E46
3	PowerPark Huvivaltio	Alahärmä, Finland	6–7 June	(Republic of Ireland) James Deane	(Japan) Naoki Nakamura	(Republic of Ireland) Conor Shanahan	Toyota GT86
4	Mondello Park	(Republic of Ireland) Kildare, Ireland	28–29 June	(Poland) Piotr Więcek	(Republic of Ireland) Conor Shanahan	(Poland) Piotr Więcek	Toyota Supra GR
5	Bikernieku Trase	Riga, Latvia	25–26 July	(Finland) Juha Rintanen	(Republic of Ireland) Conor Shanahan	(Poland) Piotr Więcek	Toyota Supra GR
6	Ferropolis	Dessau, Germany	14–17 August	(Republic of Ireland) Conor Shanahan	(Republic of Ireland) Conor Shanahan	(Republic of Ireland) Conor Shanahan	Toyota GT86
7	PGE Narodowy	Warsaw, Poland	12–13 September	(Poland) Jakub Król	(Republic of Ireland) James Deane	(Republic of Ireland) Conor Shanahan	Toyota GT86

=== Schedule changes ===
- An additional round at the Vallelunga Circuit was scheduled, increasing the total number of rounds from six to seven.
- A map showing the locations of the rounds in the 2025 championship. Circuits are marked with black dots.
  The first round was cancelled following the death of Pope Francis.
- The Spanish round was moved from Circuit Ricardo Tormo to Circuito del Jarama.
- Ferropolis returned to the calendar after a one-year absence.
- Rabocsiring Mariapócs was removed from the calendar after only one year.

== Entries ==
=== Fulltime entries ===
No.	Car	Driver	Round(s)
29	Toyota GT86	(Poland) Adam Zalewski	All
93	BMW E92	(Lithuania) Benediktas Cirba	All
96	Nissan S14A	(Netherlands) Clint van Oort	All
412	Nissan S15	(Republic of Ireland) Conor Falvey	All
79	Toyota GT86	(Republic of Ireland) Conor Shanahan	All
8	Toyota Supra GR	(Republic of Ireland) Dave Egan R	All
56	Nissan S15	(Poland) Dawid Sposób	All
111	BMW E92	(Portugal) Diogo Correia	All
25	Nissan 180SX	(Republic of Ireland) Duane McKeever	All
205	BMW E46	(Norway) Espen Rohde R	All
88	Toyota GT86	(Republic of Ireland) Fionn Roche	All
100	BMW E82	(Cyprus) George Christoforou R	All
95	BMW E46	(Israel) Itay Sadeh	All
59	Toyota GT86	(Republic of Ireland) Jack Shanahan	All
225	Nissan S14.9	(Poland) Jakub Król	All
86	Toyota GR86	(Poland) Jakub Przygoński	All
130	Ford Mustang RTR Spec 5-D	(Republic of Ireland) James Deane	All
63	Toyota Chaser	(Finland) Jarkko Jylhä R	All
3	Subaru BRZ	(France) Jason Banet R	All
89	BMW E92 M3	(Finland) Juha Pöytälaakso	All
200	Toyota GR86	(Finland) Juha Rintanen	All
11	BMW M2	(Estonia) Kevin Pesur	All
300	BMW E92	(Hungary) Kevin Piskolty	All
18	Nissan 180SX	(Finland) Lauri Heinonen	All
55	BMW F22 M2	(Czech Republic) Marco Zakouril	All
46	BMW F22	(Finland) Mika Keski-Korpi	All
999	Toyota GR86	(Japan) Naoki Nakamura	All
36	BMW E46	(Estonia) Oliver Randalu	All
12	Toyota Soarer	(Norway) Orjan Nilsen	All
74	Nissan S14A	(Poland) Paweł Korpuliński	All
215	Toyota Supra GR	(Poland) Piotr Więcek	All
77	BMW E46	(Sweden) Pontus Hartman	All
313	Toyota GT86	(United Kingdom) Steve Biagioni	1-2, 6-7
320	Mercedes Benz S203.5	(Finland) Teemu Peltola	All
498	Nissan 200SX S13	(Norway) Tor Arne Kvia	All
91	Toyota Supra GR	(Switzerland) Yves Meyer	All

R Eligible for Rookie of the Year

=== Wildcard entries ===
Car	Driver	Round(s)
BMW E30	(France) Anthony Rocci	1
Nissan S14.5	(Sweden) Joakim Andersson	1
Toyota Supra GR	(Switzerland) Joshua Reynolds	1
BMW E36	(Italy) Manuel Vacca	1
BMW E36	(Italy) Mariano Lavigna	1
BMW E92	(Czech Republic) Michal Reichert	1
Nissan S13	(Italy) Riccardo Tonali	1
BMW E92	(Spain) Alejandro Perez Beraza	2
Chevrolet C6 Corvette	(France) Alexandre Claudin	2
BMW E46	(Belgium) Denis Bertrand	2
Toyota GT86	(United States) Dmitriy Brutskiy	2
Nissan 200SX	(Spain) Joan Caballer	2
BMW E46	(Portugal) Joao Vieira	2
Toyota GT86	(Ukraine) Konstantyn Schurenko	2, 7
BMW E46	(Spain) Pedro Garcia Sanchez	2
BMW E36	(Spain) Ruben Bolaños	2
Toyota GT86	(Ukraine) Oleksii Holovnia	2, 7
Nissan Silvia PS13	(Republic of Ireland) David Garvey	3
BMW E87	(Finland) Eemi Kamula	3
Mercedes 190E	(Finland) Joona Waronen	3, 6
BMW E46	(Finland) Matias Lindell	3, 5
Nissan S13	(El Salvador) (United Arab Emirates) Nasser AlHarbali	3, 5, 6
Nissan Silvia S15	(Finland) Niko Määttälä	3
BMW E36	(Finland) Paulus Perkkiö	3
BMW E46	(Finland) Teemu Asunmaa	3, 5, 6, 7
BMW E92	(Finland) Toni Ojatalo	3, 6
Nissan Silvia S14	(Finland) Ville Kaukonen	3
Nissan Silvia S14	(Republic of Ireland) Alan Hynes	4, 7
Toyota GT86	(United States) Amanda Sorensen	4, 7
Nissan Silvia S15	(Republic of Ireland) Chris Brady	4
Toyota Supra GR	(Japan) Daigo Saito	4
BMW E46	(Republic of Ireland) Harry Kerr	4
Nissan Silvia S15	(Republic of Ireland) Kevin Quinn	4
Toyota GT86	(United Kingdom) Ryan Hughes	4
Nissan Silvia S15	(Japan) Ryusei Akiba	4
Nissan S14.9	(Norway) Simen Olsen	4
Nissan 180SX	(Republic of Ireland) Tomás Kiely	4
BMW M2 G87	(Lithuania) Andrius Vasiliauskas	5
BMW E46	(Latvia) Daniels Baumanis	5
Toyota Supra GR	(Turkey) Enver Haskasap	5, 6
Toyota GT86	(Latvia) Mārtiņs Immermanis	5
BMW E36	(Republic of Ireland) Mohamed Chehab	5
BMW E92 Eurofighter	(Latvia) Nikolass Bertans	5
Nissan S14.5	(Latvia) Rolands Bērziņs	5
BMW F22	(Lithuania) Sandra Janušauskaitė	5, 6
Mercedes-Benz-R230	(Bulgaria) Petyo Radichev	6
Nissan Silvia S15	(Republic of Ireland) Gary Dunne	6
BMW E46	(Lithuania) Gediminas Levickas	6
Nissan S13.5	(Germany) Max Heidrich	6
BMW E36 Coupe	(Croatia) Adrian Petričević	6
Toyota GT86	(Republic of Ireland) Davan Leahy	6
BMW E46	(Netherlands) Roene Zwanenburg	6
Toyota GT86	(Ukraine) Artur Havrylenko	6
Nissan S14.9	(Serbia) Nikola Ilić	6
Nissan S14.9	(Japan) Hiroya Minowa	7
Toyota GT86	(United States) Matt Field	7
Nissan S13	(Norway) Edward Alexander Husa	7
BMW E36	(United States) Adam LZ	7
Ford Mustang	(Brazil) João Barion	7
Nissan Silvia S14	(Poland) Łukasz Tasiemski	7
BMW E90	(Poland) Bartosz Ostałowski	7
BMW E92	(Denmark) Mads Andreasen	7

== Results ==
=== Round 1, Vallelunga Circuit, Italy ===
Cancelled

=== Round 2, Circuito del Jarama, Spain ===
Qualifying
Pos.	Driver	1st run	2nd run	Final score
1	(Republic of Ireland) James Deane	89.7	93.5	93.5
2	(Poland) Piotr Więcek	89.2	91.7	91.7
3	(Norway) Tor Arne Kvia	90.5	91.2	91.2
4	(Republic of Ireland) Jack Shanahan	88.5	90.5	90.5
5	(Republic of Ireland) Conor Shanahan	87.5	89.0	89.0
6	(Poland) Pawel Korpuliński	87.0	88.5	88.5
7	(Republic of Ireland) Conor Falvey	86.0	88.0	88.0
8	(Finland) Lauri Heinonen	82.2	88.0	88.0
9	(Estonia) Oliver Randalu	79.0	87.5	87.5
10	(Finland) Juha Pöytäläakso	78.5	87.5	87.5
11	(Estonia) Kevin Pesur	85.5	87.0	87.0
12	(Hungary) Kevin Piskolty	87.0	0	87.0
13	(Norway) Orjan Nilsen	82.2	86.5	86.5
14	(Poland) Dawid Sposób	0	86.5	86.5
15	(Israel) Itay Sadeh	85.5	79.5	85.5
16	(Portugal) Diogo Correia	71.0	85.5	85.5
17	(France) Jason Banet	82.5	85.0	85.0
18	(Czech Republic) Marco Zakouril	80.0	85.0	85.0
19	(Japan) Naoki Nakamura	70.0	85.0	85.0
20	(Finland) Jarkko Jylhä	84.0	76.5	84.0
21	(Ukraine) Oleksii Holovnia	73.0	82.5	82.5
22	(Finland) Mika Keski-Korpi	81.0	82.2	82.2
23	(Republic of Ireland) Dave Egan	0	82.2	82.2
24	(Poland) Jakub Król	82.0	81.0	82.0
25	(Lithuania) Benediktas Cirba	81.0	81.5	81.5
26	(Poland) Jakub Przygoński	0	81.0	81.0
27	(United Kingdom) Steve Biagioni	74.5	80.0	80.0
28	(Netherlands) Clint Van Oort	79.5	71.0	79.5
29	(Switzerland) Yves Meyer	67.5	78.7	78.7
30	(Finland) Juha Rintanen	78.5	73.5	78.5
31	(Sweden) Pontus Hartman	68.0	78.0	78.0
32	(Poland) Adam Zalewski	0	77.0	77.0
33	(United States) Dmitriy Brutskiy	0	76.5	76.5
34	(Spain) Ruben Bolaños	61.0	74.2	74.2
35	(Portugal) Joao Vieira	71.7	72.7	72.7
36	(Ukraine) Kostiantyn Shchurenko	59.5	71.5	71.5
37	(Republic of Ireland) Fionn Roche	71.0	59.5	71.0
38	(Norway) Espen Rohde	69.5	70.2	70.2
39	(Spain) Alex Perez	0	64.7	64.7
40	(Finland) Teemu Peltola	0	60.5	60.5
41	(Spain) Joan Caballer	59.5	0	59.5
42	(Belgium) Denis Bertrand	58.5	0	58.5
43	(Cyprus) George Christoforou	54.0	56.7	56.7
44	(Spain) Pedro Garcia Sanchez	50.0	0	50.0

Qualifying showdown bracket

Semifinals
1	**(Republic of Ireland) James Deane**
4	(Republic of Ireland) Jack Shanahan
3	(Norway) Tor Arne Kvia
2	**(Poland) Piotr Więcek**

Finals
(Republic of Ireland) James Deane
**(Poland) Piotr Więcek**

Note: Winners of each battle are shown in **bold**.

Top 32 bracket

Round of 32
**(Republic of Ireland) James Deane**
(Poland) Adam Zalewski
(Portugal) Diogo Correia
**(France) Jason Banet**
**(Finland) Lauri Heinonen**
(Lithuania) Benediktas Cirba
**(Estonia) Oliver Randalu**
(Poland) Jakub Król
**(Republic of Ireland) Jack Shanahan**
(Switzerland) Yves Meyer
**(Norway) Orjan Nilsen**
(Finland) Jarkko Jylhä
**(Republic of Ireland) Conor Shanahan**
(Netherlands) Clint Van Oort
(Hungary) Kevin Piskolty
**(Ukraine) Oleksii Holovnia**
(Poland) Piotr Więcek
**(Sweden) Pontus Hartman**
**(Israel) Itay Sadeh**
(Czech Republic) Marco Zakouril
**(Republic of Ireland) Conor Falvey**
(Poland) Jakub Przygoński
**(Finland) Juha Pöytälaakso**
(Republic of Ireland) Dave Egan
(Norway) Tor Arne Kvia
**(Finland) Juha Rintanen**
**(Poland) Dawid Sposób**
(Japan) Naoki Nakamura
**(Poland) Paweł Korpuliński**
(United Kingdom) Steve Biagioni
**(Estonia) Kevin Pesur**
(Finland) Mika Keski-Korpi

Round of 16
**(Republic of Ireland) James Deane**
(France) Jason Banet
(Finland) Lauri Heinonen
**(Estonia) Oliver Randalu**
**(Republic of Ireland) Jack Shanahan**
(Norway) Orjan Nilsen
**(Republic of Ireland) Conor Shanahan**
(Ukraine) Oleksii Holovnia
**(Israel) Itay Sadeh**
(Sweden) Pontus Hartman
**(Republic of Ireland) Conor Falvey**
(Finland) Juha Pöytälaakso
(Poland) Dawid Sposób
**(Finland) Juha Rintanen**
(Poland) Paweł Korpuliński
**(Estonia) Kevin Pesur**

Quarterfinals
(Republic of Ireland) James Deane
**(Estonia) Oliver Randalu**
**(Republic of Ireland) Jack Shanahan**
(Republic of Ireland) Conor Shanahan
(Republic of Ireland) Conor Falvey
**(Israel) Itay Sadeh**
**(Estonia) Kevin Pesur**
(Finland) Juha Rintanen

Semifinals
(Republic of Ireland) Jack Shanahan
**(Estonia) Oliver Randalu**
(Estonia) Kevin Pesur
**(Israel) Itay Sadeh**

Final
**(Estonia) Oliver Randalu**
(Israel) Itay Sadeh
Third place
(Republic of Ireland) Jack Shanahan
**(Estonia) Kevin Pesur**

Note: Winners of each battle are shown in **bold**.

=== Round 3, PowerPark Huvivaltio, Finland ===
Qualifying
Pos.	Driver	1st run	2nd run	Final score
1	(Republic of Ireland) James Deane	98.5	90.5	98.5
2	(Republic of Ireland) Duane Mckeever	93.0	98.0	98.0
3	(Poland) Piotr Więcek	88.0	97.2	97.2
4	(Japan) Naoki Nakamura	93.7	97.0	97.0
5	(Estonia) Oliver Randalu	92.0	95.5	95.5
6	(Republic of Ireland) Jack Shanahan	94.0	95.2	95.2
7	(Israel) Itay Sadeh	94.0	95.0	95.0
8	(Poland) Pawel Korpuliński	93.2	95.0	95.0
9	(Estonia) Kevin Pesur	92.0	95.0	95.0
10	(Finland) Lauri Heinonen	94.0	94.5	94.5
11	(Republic of Ireland) Conor Shanahan	93.0	94.5	94.5
12	(Finland) Mika Keski-Korpi	94.0	94.0	94.0
13	(Norway) Tor Arne Kvia	92.5	93.5	93.5
14	(Poland) Jakub Król	91.0	93.5	93.5
15	(Finland) Juha Pöytälaakso	86.5	93.0	93.0
16	(Portugal) Diogo Correia	93.0	0	93.0
17	(Finland) Juha Rintanen	90.5	92.5	92.5
18	(Poland) Jakub Przygoński	92.0	87.0	92.0
19	(Norway) Orjan Nilsen	0	92.0	92.0
20	(Lithuania) Benediktas Cirba	0	92.0	92.0
21	(Netherlands) Clint Van Oort	89.5	91.5	91.5
22	(Republic of Ireland) Conor Falvey	86.5	91.5	91.5
23	(Switzerland) Yves Meyer	91.5	83.0	91.5
24	(Czech Republic) Marco Zakouril	90.5	81.5	90.5
25	(Hungary) Kevin Piskolty	90.0	86.5	90.0
26	(Finland) Jarkko Jylhä	89.0	0	89.0
27	(France) Jason Banet	85.0	88.5	88.5
28	(Finland) Paulus Perkkiö	81.5	88.5	88.5
29	(Poland) Dawid Sposób	79.0	88.5	88.5
30	(Finland) Teemu Asunmaa	86.0	80.0	86.0
31	(Cyprus) George Christoforou	77.0	85.5	85.5
32	(El Salvador) Nasser Alharbali	0	85.5	85.5
33	(Republic of Ireland) Fionn Roche	0	85.0	85.0
34	(Sweden) Pontus Hartman	82.5	84.5	84.5
35	(Finland) Ville Kaukonen	83.5	84.0	84.0
36	(Republic of Ireland) David Garvey	77.5	83.5	83.5
37	(Finland) Teemu Peltola	0	83.5	83.5
38	(Finland) Niko Määttälä	78.5	78.5	78.5
39	(Republic of Ireland) Dave Egan	78.5	0	78.5
40	(Finland) Matias Lindell	77.5	75.5	77.5
41	(Finland) Toni Ojatalo	0	75.0	75.0
42	(Norway) Espen Rohde	0	67.0	67.0
43	(Finland) Joona Waronen	67.0	0	67.0
44	(Finland) Eemi Kamula	0	0	0

Qualifying showdown bracket

Semifinals
1	(Republic of Ireland) James Deane
4	**(Japan) Naoki Nakamura**
3	**(Republic of Ireland) Duane McKeever**
2	(Poland) Piotr Więcek

Finals
**(Japan) Naoki Nakamura**
(Republic of Ireland) Duane McKeever

Note: Winners of each battle are shown in **bold**.

Top 32 bracket

Round of 32
**(Republic of Ireland) James Deane**
(El Salvador) Nasser Alharbali
(Portugal) Diogo Correia
**(Finland) Juha Rintanen**
**(Poland) Paweł Korpuliński**
(Hungary) Kevin Piskolty
(Estonia) Kevin Pesur
**(Czech Republic) Marco Zakouril**
**(Japan) Naoki Nakamura**
(Poland) Dawid Sposób
**(Norway) Tor Arne Kvia**
(Lithuania) Benediktas Cirba
**(Estonia) Oliver Randalu**
(Finland) Paulus Perkkiö
**(Finland) Mika Keski-Korpi**
(Netherlands) Clint Van Oort
(Republic of Ireland) Duane McKeever
**(Cyprus) George Christoforou**
(Finland) Juha Pöytälaakso
**(Poland) Jakub Przygoński**
(Israel) Itay Sadeh
**(Finland) Jarkko Jylhä**
**(Finland) Lauri Heinonen**
(Switzerland) Yves Meyer
**(Poland) Piotr Więcek**
(Finland) Teemu Asunmaa
(Poland) Jakub Król
**(Norway) Orjan Nilsen**
**(Republic of Ireland) Jack Shanahan**
(France) Jason Banet
**(Republic of Ireland) Conor Shanahan**
(Republic of Ireland) Conor Falvey

Round of 16
**(Republic of Ireland) James Deane**
(Finland) Juha Rintanen
**(Poland) Paweł Korpuliński**
(Czech Republic) Marco Zakouril
(Japan) Naoki Nakamura
**(Norway) Tor Arne Kvia**
(Estonia) Oliver Randalu
**(Finland) Mika Keski-Korpi**
**(Poland) Jakub Przygoński**
(Cyprus) George Christoforou
**(Finland) Lauri Heinonen**
(Finland) Jarkko Jylhä
**(Poland) Piotr Więcek**
(Norway) Orjan Nilsen
(Republic of Ireland) Jack Shanahan
**(Republic of Ireland) Conor Shanahan**

Quarterfinals
(Republic of Ireland) James Deane
**(Poland) Paweł Korpuliński**
(Finland) Mika Keski-Korpi
**(Norway) Tor Arne Kvia**
**(Finland) Lauri Heinonen**
(Poland) Jakub Przygoński
(Poland) Piotr Więcek
**(Republic of Ireland) Conor Shanahan**

Semifinals
(Poland) Paweł Korpuliński
**(Norway) Tor Arne Kvia**
(Finland) Lauri Heinonen
**(Republic of Ireland) Conor Shanahan**

Final
**(Republic of Ireland) Conor Shanahan**
(Norway) Tor Arne Kvia
Third place
(Poland) Paweł Korpuliński
**(Finland) Lauri Heinonen**

Note: Winners of each battle are shown in **bold**.

=== Round 4, Mondello Park, Ireland ===
Qualifying
Pos.	Driver	1st run	2nd run	Final score
1	(Poland) Piotr Więcek	99.5	96.0	99.5
2	(Republic of Ireland) Conor Shanahan	91.0	97.0	97.0
3	(Poland) Jakub Przygoński	96.0	87.0	96.0
4	(Czech Republic) Marco Zakouril	91.5	95.0	95.0
5	(Norway) Orjan Nilsen	95.0	0	95.0
6	(Norway) Tor Arne Kvia	93.0	94.0	94.0
7	(Finland) Juha Pöytälaakso	90.0	94.0	94.0
8	(Republic of Ireland) Tomas Kiely	88.5	94.0	94.0
9	(Poland) Pawel Korpuliński	86.0	94.0	94.0
10	(Finland) Lauri Heinonen	73.5	94.0	94.0
11	(Finland) Mika Keski-Korpi	89.5	93.5	93.5
12	(Republic of Ireland) Conor Falvey	92.5	88.0	92.5
13	(France) Jason Banet	91.5	91.5	91.5
14	(Republic of Ireland) James Deane	91.5	0	91.5
15	(Republic of Ireland) Harry Kerr	89.5	90.5	90.5
16	(Lithuania) Benediktas Cirba	74.5	90.5	90.5
17	(Norway) Simen Olsen	83.5	89.0	89.0
18	(Republic of Ireland) Duane Mckeever	89.0	0	89.0
19	(Estonia) Kevin Pesur	88.5	88.5	88.5
20	(Finland) Jarkko Jylhä	88.0	88.5	88.5
21	(Japan) Daigo Saito	59.5	88.0	88.0
22	(Poland) Jakub Król	85.5	87.0	87.0
23	(Japan) Naoki Nakamura	78.5	87.0	87.0
24	(Hungary) Kevin Piskolty	83.0	86.5	86.5
25	(Republic of Ireland) Jack Shanahan	0	86.5	86.5
26	(Finland) Juha Rintanen	86.0	77.5	86.0
27	(Republic of Ireland) Chris Brady	80.5	84.5	84.5
28	(Estonia) Oliver Randalu	82.5	77.5	82.5
29	(Netherlands) Clint Van Oort	75.5	81.5	81.5
30	(Republic of Ireland) Fionn Roche	0	81.5	81.5
31	(Israel) Itay Sadeh	0	81.0	81.0
32	(Republic of Ireland) Alan Hynes	73.5	79.5	79.5
33	(United Kingdom) Ryan Hughes	78.5	79.0	79.0
34	(Finland) Teemu Peltola	79.0	70.5	79.0
35	(Republic of Ireland) Kevin Quinn	71.0	77.5	77.5
36	(Switzerland) Yves Meyer	75.5	76.0	76.0
37	(Cyprus) George Christoforou	0	74.5	74.5
38	(Portugal) Diogo Correia	70.5	0	70.5
39	(United States) Amanda Sorensen	69.0	69.0	69.0
40	(Republic of Ireland) Dave Egan	0	0	0

Qualifying showdown bracket

Semifinals
1	(Poland) Piotr Więcek
4	**(Czech Republic) Marco Zakouril**
3	(Poland) Jakub Przygoński
2	**(Republic of Ireland) Conor Shanahan**

Finals
(Czech Republic) Marco Zakouril
**(Republic of Ireland) Conor Shanahan**

Note: Winners of each battle are shown in **bold**.

=== Round 5, Bikernieku Trase, Latvia ===
Qualifying
Pos.	Driver	1st run	2nd run	Final score
1	(Finland) Juha Rintanen	95.0	94.5	95.0
2	(Republic of Ireland) Conor Shanahan	91.0	95.0	95.0
3	(Poland) Piotr Więcek	91.0	95.0	95.0
4	(Republic of Ireland) James Deane	91.0	95.0	95.0
5	(Republic of Ireland) Duane Mckeever	94.0	88.0	94.0
6	(Israel) Itay Sadeh	93.5	93.0	93.5
7	(Republic of Ireland) Jack Shanahan	92.5	91.5	92.5
8	(France) Jason Banet	92.5	88.5	92.5
9	(El Salvador) Nasser Alharbali	83.5	92.0	92.0
10	(Norway) Orjan Nilsen	89.5	91.5	91.5
11	(Finland) Jarkko Jylhä	81.5	91.5	91.5
12	(Republic of Ireland) Conor Falvey	90.5	90.0	90.5
13	(Poland) Jakub Przygoński	90.0	90.5	90.5
14	(Japan) Naoki Nakamura	90.5	82.0	90.5
15	(Czech Republic) Marco Zakouril	90.5	0	90.5
16	(Poland) Dawid Sposób	90.0	87.5	90.0
17	(Poland) Pawel Korpuliński	83.0	90.0	90.0
18	(Hungary) Kevin Piskolty	89.5	86.0	89.5
19	(Estonia) Kevin Pesur	82.0	89.5	89.5
20	(Norway) Tor Arne Kvia	85.0	89.0	89.0
21	(Portugal) Diogo Correia	88.0	88.0	88.0
22	(Switzerland) Yves Meyer	85.0	88.0	88.0
23	(Poland) Jakub Król	87.5	80.0	87.5
24	(Latvia) Nikolass Bertans	84.5	87.0	87.0
25	(Finland) Mika Keski-Korpi	82.5	87.0	87.0
26	(Estonia) Oliver Randalu	85.5	86.5	86.5
27	(Republic of Ireland) Fionn Roche	86.5	81.5	86.5
28	(Finland) Lauri Heinonen	82.5	86.0	86.0
29	(Finland) Juha Pöytälaakso	76.0	86.0	86.0
30	(Lithuania) Andrius Vasiliauskas	70.5	86.0	86.0
31	(Lithuania) Benediktas Cirba	85.5	71.0	85.5
32	(Norway) Espen Rohde	84.0	84.5	84.5
33	(Finland) Teemu Asunmaa	81.5	84.5	84.5
34	(Latvia) Daniels Baumanis	68.5	82.5	82.5
35	(Finland) Matias Lindell	80.5	81.5	81.5
36	(Republic of Ireland) Dave Egan	0	81.5	81.5
37	(Netherlands) Clint Van Oort	81.0	0	81.0
38	(Latvia) Rolands Berzins	79.0	77.5	79.0
39	(Cyprus) George Christoforou	0	75.5	75.5
40	(Latvia) Edgars Krogeris	75.0	0	75.0
41	(Latvia) Martinš Immermanis	68.5	69.5	69.5
42	(Republic of Ireland) Mohamad Chehab	56.5	66.5	66.5
43	(Finland) Teemu Peltola	0	57.5	57.5
44	(Lithuania) Sandra Janušauskaite	0	0	0

Qualifying showdown bracket

Semifinals
1	**(Republic of Ireland) James Deane**
4	(Finland) Juha Rintanen
3	(Poland) Piotr Więcek
2	**(Republic of Ireland) Conor Shanahan**

Finals
(Republic of Ireland) James Deane
**(Republic of Ireland) Conor Shanahan**

Note: Winners of each battle are shown in **bold**.

=== Round 6, Ferropolis, Germany ===
Qualifying
Pos.	Driver	1st run	2nd run	Final score
1	(Republic of Ireland) Conor Shanahan	95.5	97.5	97.5
2	(Poland) Piotr Więcek	97.0	91.0	97.0
3	(Republic of Ireland) Jack Shanahan	96.5	0	96.5
4	(Poland) Pawel Korpuliński	94.0	92.0	94.0
5	(Republic of Ireland) James Deane	93.0	93.5	93.5
6	(Finland) Mika Keski-Korpi	93.5	85.0	93.5
7	(Norway) Tor Arne Kvia	93.0	92.5	93.0
8	(Czech Republic) Marco Zakouril	93.0	87.5	93.0
9	(Finland) Juha Rintanen	93.0	87.0	93.0
10	(Finland) Lauri Heinonen	93.0	86.5	93.0
11	(Finland) Juha Pöytälaakso	86.5	92.5	92.5
12	(Estonia) Kevin Pesur	86.5	92.5	92.5
13	(Poland) Jakub Król	92.5	76.0	92.5
14	(Norway) Espen Rohde	92.5	0	92.5
15	(Israel) Itay Sadeh	91.5	88.5	91.5
16	(Republic of Ireland) Duane Mckeever	0	91.5	91.5
17	(Netherlands) Clint Van Oort	91.0	81.0	91.0
18	(Poland) Jakub Przygoński	88.0	90.5	90.5
19	(Lithuania) Gediminas Levickas	90.0	76.5	90.0
20	(Norway) Orjan Nilsen	87.0	89.5	89.5
21	(Republic of Ireland) Conor Falvey	89.5	82.5	89.5
22	(El Salvador) Nasser Alharbali	89.0	82.0	89.0
23	(Switzerland) Yves Meyer	89.0	0	89.0
24	(Japan) Naoki Nakamura	83.0	88.5	88.5
25	(Estonia) Oliver Randalu	88.5	74.5	88.5
26	(Hungary) Kevin Piskolty	87.5	77.5	87.5
27	(Portugal) Diogo Correia	77.5	87.0	87.0
28	(Germany) Max Heidrich	0	87.0	87.0
29	(Republic of Ireland) Dave Egan	86.5	73.5	86.5
30	(Poland) Dawid Sposób	86.5	0	86.5
31	(Republic of Ireland) Fionn Roche	85.5	86.0	86.0
32	(Finland) Jarkko Jylhä	0	86.0	86.0
33	(Lithuania) Benediktas Cirba	85.5	85.0	85.5
34	(Finland) Teemu Asunmaa	85.0	85.0	85.0
35	(United Kingdom) Steve Biagioni	84.0	83.0	84.0
36	(France) Jason Banet	78.5	83.5	83.5
37	(Republic of Ireland) Davan Leahy	82.5	0	82.5
38	(Finland) Joona Waronen	0	82.0	82.0
39	(Croatia) Adrian Petričević	81.5	0	81.5
40	(Finland) Toni Ojatalo	66.0	78.5	78.5
41	(Finland) Teemu Peltola	78.0	68.0	78.0
42	(Serbia) Nikola Ilić	77.0	0	77.0
43	(Republic of Ireland) Gary Dunne	72.5	76.0	76.0
44	(Turkey) Enver Haskasap	71.5	74.5	74.5
45	(Bulgaria) Petyo Radichev	67.0	74.5	74.5
46	(Ukraine) Artur Havrylenko	70.0	73.0	73.0
47	(Netherlands) Roene Zwanenburg	71.5	69.0	71.5
48	(Cyprus) George Christoforou	68.5	61.0	68.5
49	(Lithuania) Sandra Janušauskaite	41.0	0	41.0

Qualifying showdown bracket

Semifinals
1	**(Republic of Ireland) Conor Shanahan**
4	(Poland) Paweł Korpuliński
3	**(Republic of Ireland) Jack Shanahan**
2	(Poland) Piotr Więcek

Finals
**(Republic of Ireland) Conor Shanahan**
(Republic of Ireland) Jack Shanahan

Note: Winners of each battle are shown in **bold**.

=== Round 7, PGE Narodowy, Poland ===
Qualifying
Pos.	Driver	1st run	2nd run	Final score
1	(Poland) Jakub Król	89.0	98.0	98.0
2	(Poland) Piotr Więcek	97.2	97.0	97.2
3	(Republic of Ireland) James Deane	96.5	97.2	97.2
4	(Estonia) Kevin Pesur	96.0	96.5	96.5
5	(Poland) Pawel Korpuliński	94.5	96.0	96.0
6	(Republic of Ireland) Jack Shanahan	94.0	95.5	95.5
7	(Finland) Lauri Heinonen	93.0	95.5	95.5
8	(Japan) Hiroya Minowa	95.5	0	95.5
9	(Finland) Jarkko Jylhä	95.0	95.2	95.2
10	(Republic of Ireland) Conor Shanahan	95.2	0	95.2
11	(Norway) Orjan Nilsen	93.5	95.0	95.0
12	(Republic of Ireland) Conor Falvey	91.5	95.0	95.0
13	(France) Jason Banet	87.0	94.7	94.7
14	(Portugal) Diogo Correia	93.0	94.5	94.5
15	(Finland) Mika Keski-Korpi	92.0	94.5	94.5
16	(Republic of Ireland) Alan Hynes	94.5	91.5	94.5
17	(Poland) Lukasz Tasiemski	86.0	94.5	94.5
18	(Finland) Juha Pöytälaakso	85.0	93.5	93.5
19	(Finland) Juha Rintanen	93.0	91.5	93.0
20	(Norway) Tor Arne Kvia	91.2	93.0	93.0
21	(Hungary) Kevin Piskolty	92.5	92.5	92.5
22	(Estonia) Oliver Randalu	92.5	92.5	92.5
23	(United States) Matt Field	73.5	92.5	92.5
24	(Japan) Naoki Nakamura	91.0	92.0	92.0
25	(Republic of Ireland) Duane Mckeever	91.0	92.0	92.0
26	(Poland) Dawid Sposób	91.5	88.0	91.5
27	(Poland) Jakub Przygoński	85.0	91.5	91.5
28	(Ukraine) Oleksii Holovnia	81.5	91.5	91.5
29	(United States) Adam LZ	89.5	88.5	89.5
30	(Lithuania) Benediktas Cirba	89.5	85.5	89.5
31	(Norway) Espen Rohde	89.5	0	89.5
32	(Netherlands) Clint Van Oort	88.5	84.5	88.5
33	(Finland) Teemu Peltola	88.5	79.5	88.5
34	(Republic of Ireland) Fionn Roche	88.0	86.0	88.0
35	(United Kingdom) Steve Biagioni	77.5	88.0	88.0
36	(Israel) Itay Sadeh	70.5	86.0	86.0
37	(Finland) Teemu Asunmaa	84.5	85.5	85.5
38	(Switzerland) Yves Meyer	67.0	85.0	85.0
39	(Denmark) Mads Andreasen	84.5	82.5	84.5
40	(Norway) Edward Alexander Husa	83.0	83.5	83.5
41	(Brazil) João Barion	76.5	82.5	82.5
42	(Cyprus) George Christoforou	74.5	81.5	81.5
43	(United States) Amanda Sorensen	66.0	81.0	81.0
44	(Republic of Ireland) Dave Egan	79.5	0	79.5
45	(Poland) Adam Zalewski	0	0	0
46	(Czech Republic) Marco Zakouril	0	0	0
47	(Ukraine) Kostiantyn Shchurenko	0	0	0
48	(Poland) Bartosz Ostałowski	0	0	0

Qualifying showdown bracket

Semifinals
1	(Poland) Jakub Król
4	**(Estonia) Kevin Pesur**
3	**(Republic of Ireland) James Deane**
2	(Poland) Piotr Więcek

Finals
(Estonia) Kevin Pesur
**(Republic of Ireland) James Deane**

Note: Winners of each battle are shown in **bold**.

== Championship standings ==
=== Qualifying stage ===
Position	**1st**	**2nd**	**3rd**	**4th**	**5th**	**6th**	**7th**	**8th**
Qualifying points	**8**	**7**	**6**	**5**	**4**	**3**	**2**	**1**
Qualifying showdown points	**4**	**3**	**2**	**1**	–			

=== Competition stage ===
Position	**1st**	**2nd**	**3rd**	**4th**	**5th–8th**	**9th–16th**	**17th–32nd**
Points	100	88	76	64	48	32	16

=== Drivers standings ===
Pos.	Driver	(Italy) R1	(Spain) R2	(Finland) R3	(Republic of Ireland) R4	(Latvia) R5	(Germany) R6	(Poland) R7	Points
1	(Republic of Ireland) Conor Shanahan	C	6^{5}	1	2^{2 1}	18^{2 1}	**1^{1 1}**	1	490
2	(Poland) Piotr Więcek	C	17^{2 1}	6^{3 4}	**1^{1 3}**	1^{3 4}	3^{2 3}	18^{2 4}	406
3	(Republic of Ireland) Jack Shanahan	C	4^{4 4}	11^{6}	15	4^{7}	2^{3 2}	5^{6}	351
4	(Poland) Paweł Korpuliński	C	9^{6}	4^{8}	7	25	4^{4 4}	2^{5}	327
5	(Republic of Ireland) James Deane	C	**5^{1 2}**	**5^{1 4}**	21	2^{4 2}	17^{5}	4^{3 1}	323
6	(Estonia) Kevin Pesur	C	3	19	3	13	8	19^{4 2}	272
7	(Finland) Lauri Heinonen	C	10^{8}	3	10	16	7	9^{7}	255
8	(Estonia) Oliver Randalu	C	1	10^{5}	16	30	27	14	232
9	(Norway) Tor Arne Kvia	C	18^{3 3}	2	5^{6}	14	18^{7}	26	229
10	(Republic of Ireland) Conor Falvey	C	7^{7}	25	8	6	25	10	210
11	(Japan) Naoki Nakamura	C	22	9^{4 1}	25	23	14	3	197
12	(Czech Republic) Marco Zakouril	C	21	14	4^{4 2}	24	6^{8}	46	185
13	(Finland) Mika Keski-Korpi	C	24	7	19	29	5^{6}	13	179
14	(Israel) Itay Sadeh	C	2	18^{7}	31	20^{6}	11	36	173
15	(Finland) Jarkko Jylhä RY	C	23	15	13	5	32	21	160
16	(Finland) Juha Rintanen	C	8	12	27	**17^{1 3}**	19	25	154
17	(Poland) Jakub Przygoński	C	28	8	9^{3 4}	22	22	30	152
18	(Norway) Orjan Nilsen	C	12	13	17^{5}	10	24	22	148
19	(Finland) Juha Pöytälaakso	C	11	21	6^{7}	31	20	24	146
20	(Republic of Ireland) Duane McKeever	C		17^{2 2}	12	19^{5}	12	15	142
21	(Poland) Jakub Król	C	26	20	14	28	9	**17^{1 3}**	138
22	(France) Jason Banet R	C	14	28	20	9^{8}	36	11	129
23	(Norway) Espen Rohde R	C	38	42		8	10	8	128
24	(Hungary) Kevin Piskolty	C	19	27	26	12	15	27	128
25	(Lithuania) Benediktas Cirba	C	27	23	23	7	33	32	112
26	(Poland) Dawid Sposób	C	13	30		11	30	29	112
27	(Portugal) Diogo Correia	C	20	22	38	26	28	12	96
28	(Netherlands) Clint van Oort	C	30	24	29	37	21	16	96
29	(Latvia) Nikolass Bertans W					3			76
30	(Republic of Ireland) Alan Hynes W	C			32			6	64
31	(El Salvador) (United Arab Emirates) Nasser AlHarbali W			32		21	13		64
32	(Republic of Ireland) Fionn Roche	C	37	33	30	15	31	34	64
33	(Switzerland) Yves Meyer	C	31	26	36	27	26	38	64
34	(United States) Adam LZ W							7	48
35	(Ukraine) Oleksii Holovnia W		15					31	32
36	(Norway) Simen Olsen W				11				32
37	(Sweden) Pontus Hartman	C	16	34					32
38	(Cyprus) George Christoforou R	C		16	35	39	48	42	32
39	(Germany) Max Heidrich W						16		32
40	(Republic of Ireland) Dave Egan R	C	25	39	40	36	29	44	32
41	(Republic of Ireland) Tomás Kiely W				18^{8}				17
42	(Japan) Hiroya Minowa W							20^{8}	17
43	(Republic of Ireland) Harry Kerr W				22				16
44	(Lithuania) Gediminas Levickas W						23		16
44	(Poland) Łukasz Tasiemski W							23	16
46	(Japan) Daigo Saito W				24				16
47	(United States) Matt Field W							28	16
48	(Republic of Ireland) Chris Brady W				28				16
49	(United Kingdom) Steve Biagioni	C	29				35	35	16
50	(Finland) Paulus Perkkiö W			29					16
51	(Finland) Teemu Asunmaa W			31		33	34	37	16
52	(Poland) Adam Zalewski	C	32					45	16
53	(Lithuania) Andrius Vasiliauskas W					32			16
NC	(Finland) Teemu Peltola	C	40	37	34	43	41	33	0

In-line notation
Blank	Didn't participate
	Place in qualifying (Did not qualify)
^{Superscript number 1}	Place in qualifying (Top 8)
^{Superscript number 2}	Place in qualifying showdown
**Bold**	Top qualifier
W	Wildcard
R	Rookie
RY	Rookie of the Year

=== Nations Cup standings ===
Nation Cup points are awarded each round to the two drivers with the highest classified finish for each nation.

Pos	Nation	(Italy) R1	(Spain) R2	(Finland) R3	(Republic of Ireland) R4	(Latvia) R5	(Germany) R6	(Poland) R7	Points
1	(Republic of Ireland) Ireland	C	4	1	2	2	1	1	979
1	(Republic of Ireland) Ireland	C	5	5	8	4	2	4	979
2	Poland	C	9	4	1	1	3	2	756
2	Poland	C	13	6	7	11	4	17	756
3	Finland	C	8	3	6	5	5	9	532
3	Finland	C	10	7	10	16	7	13	532
4	Estonia	C	1	10	3	13	8	14	504
4	Estonia	C	3	19	16	30	27	19	504
5	Norway	C	12	2	5	8	10	8	453
5	Norway	C	18	13	11	10	18	22	453
6	Japan	C	22	9	25	23	14	3	230
6	Japan					24		20	230
7	Czech Republic	C	21	14	4	24	6	48	185
7	Czech Republic	C							185
8	Israel	C	2	18	31	20	11	36	173
9	Lithuania	C	27	23	23	7	23	32	144
9	Lithuania					32	33		144
10	France	C	14	28	20	9	36	11	129
10	France	C							129
11	Hungary	C	19	27	26	12	15	27	128
12	Portugal	C	20	22	38	26	28	12	96
12	Portugal		35						96
12	Netherlands	C	30	24	29	37	21	16	96
12	Netherlands						47		96
14	Latvia					3			76
14	Latvia					38			76
15	El Salvador			32		21	13		64
15	Switzerland	C	31	26	36	27	26	38	64
15	Switzerland	C							64
15	United States		33		39			7	64
15	United States							28	64
18	Ukraine		15					31	48
18	Ukraine		36					45	48
19	Sweden	C	16	34					32
19	Sweden	C							32
19	Cyprus	C		16	35	39	48	42	32
19	Germany	C					16		32
22	United Kingdom	C	29		33		35	35	16
