= 2026 Drift Masters season =

Car drifting competition season

The 2026 Drift Masters season was the twelfth full season of the Drift Masters series. The season began on May 1 at Vallelunga Circuit and concluded on September 12 at PGE Narodowy custom built track after seven events.

Paweł Korpuliński won his first Drift Masters championship, driving a Nissan S14.

== Calendar ==
Round	Circuit	Location	Date	Qualifying winner	Winner	Car
1	Vallelunga Circuit	Campagnano di Roma, Italy	1–2 May	(Republic of Ireland) Duane McKeever	(Republic of Ireland) Conor Shanahan	Toyota GT86
2	Circuito del Jarama	Madrid, Spain	16–17 May	(Republic of Ireland) James Deane	(Poland) Piotr Więcek	Toyota GR Supra
3	Mondello Park	(Republic of Ireland) Kildare, Ireland	13–14 June	(Republic of Ireland) Conor Shanahan	(Poland) Paweł Korpuliński	Nissan S14
4	Ahvenisto Race Circuit	Hämeenlinna, Finland	11–12 July	(Poland) Piotr Więcek	(Republic of Ireland) Jack Shanahan	Toyota GT86
5	Bikernieku Trase	Riga, Latvia	24–25 July	(Poland) Piotr Więcek	(Poland) Paweł Korpuliński	Nissan S14
6	Ferropolis	Dessau, Germany	13–15 August	(Republic of Ireland) Conor Shanahan	(Poland) Piotr Więcek	Toyota GR Supra
7	PGE Narodowy	Warsaw, Poland	11–12 September	(Republic of Ireland) James Deane	(Republic of Ireland) Conor Shanahan	Toyota GT86

A map showing the locations of the rounds in the 2026 championship. Circuits are marked with black dots.

=== Schedule changes ===
- The round in Finland was moved from PowerPark Huvivaltio to Ahvenisto Race Circuit.

== Entries ==
=== Fulltime entries ===
Car	No.	Driver	Round(s)
Nissan S15	37	(Republic of Ireland) Alan Hynes	2–7
BMW M2 G87	93	(Lithuania) Benediktas Cirba	All
Nissan S14	96	(Netherlands) Clint van Oort	All
Nissan S15	412	(Republic of Ireland) Conor Falvey	All
Toyota GT86	79	(Republic of Ireland) Conor Shanahan	All
Toyota GR Supra	8	(Republic of Ireland) Dave Egan	All
Nissan S15	56	(Poland) Dawid Sposób	All
BMW E92 Eurofighter	111	(Portugal) Diogo Correia	All
Nissan 180SX	25	(Republic of Ireland) Duane McKeever	All
Nissan S15	535	(Turkey) Enver Haskasap	All
BMW E46	205	(Norway) Espen Rohde	All
BMW E82	100	(Cyprus) George Christoforou	All
BMW E46	103	(Republic of Ireland) Harry Kerr R	All
BMW M2 G87	95	(Israel) Itay Sadeh	2–7
Toyota GT86	59	(Republic of Ireland) Jack Shanahan	All
Nissan S14.9	225	(Poland) Jakub Król	All
Toyota GR86	86	(Poland) Jakub Przygoński	All
Ford Mustang RTR	130	(Republic of Ireland) James Deane	All
Toyota Chaser JZX100	63	(Finland) Jarkko Jylhä	All
Subaru BRZ	3	(France) Jason Banet	All
BMW E92 Eurofighter	89	(Finland) Juha Pöytälaakso	All
Toyota GR86	200	(Finland) Juha Rintanen	All
BMW M2 G87	7	(Egypt) Karim Hany R	All
BMW M2 G87	11	(Estonia) Kevin Pesur	All
Toyota GR86	300	(Hungary) Kevin Piskolty	All
Toyota GT86	16	(Ukraine) Konstantyn Shchurenko R	All
Nissan 180SX; BMW F22 Eurofighter (Note: Heinonen suffered an engine failure during practice before the round in Finland and used Mika Keski-Korpi's spare BMW F22 Eurofighter for the remainder of the round.)	18	(Finland) Lauri Heinonen	1–5 (Note: Heinonen was entered for the round in Germany, but withdrew after fracturing his wrist in an accident during practice.)
BMW M2 F87	55	(Czech Republic) Marco Zakouřil	All
BMW F22 Eurofighter	46	(Finland) Mika Keski-Korpi	All
Nissan 400Z	23	(El Salvador) Nasser Alharbali	All
BMW E92 HGK	12	(Latvia) Nikolass Bertans	All
BMW E46	36	(Estonia) Oliver Randalu	All
Nissan S14	74	(Poland) Paweł Korpuliński	All
Toyota GR Supra	215	(Poland) Piotr Więcek	All
Nissan S14.9	707	(Norway) Simen Olsen R	All
BMW M2 F87	87	(Finland) Teemu Asunmaa R	All
Toyota GR Yaris	91	(Switzerland) Yves Meyer	1–2, 5–7

R Eligible for Rookie of the Year

=== Wildcard entries ===
Car	Driver	Round(s)
BMW E36	(France) Anthony Rocci	1
Alfa Romeo Veloce; Nissan S14	(Poland) Łukasz Tasiemski	1, 7
BMW E92 Eurofighter	(Denmark) Mads Andreasen	1, 4
BMW E36	(Italy) Manuel Vacca	1
BMW E36	(Italy) Michele Landolfi	1
Nissan 180SX	(Italy) Riccardo Tonali	1
BMW 1M	(Spain) Adrián Cabanillas	2
Ford Mustang RTR	(Ukraine) Igor Derenko	2, 6–7
BMW E46	(Portugal) João Vieira	2
BMW E82	(Norway) Ole Peter Vatn	2
Mercedes-AMG GT	(Portugal) Raman Kandratsenka	2, 5
Nissan S14	(Ukraine) Timur Lypskyi	2, 6
BMW E46	(Republic of Ireland) Alex Butler	3
BMW E36	(Republic of Ireland) Callum Coogan	3
Nissan 180SX	(Republic of Ireland) Dylan Garvey	3, 6
BMW E92	(United Kingdom) Dylan Wilson	3
Nissan S14	(Poland) Jakub Krzyszczak	3
Nissan Silvia S13	(United Kingdom) Steven McConnell	3
BMW E92 Eurofighter	(Estonia) Graig Meriloo	4
BMW E36	(Finland) Kristiina Aalto	4
BMW E46	(Finland) Kim Björklund	4
BMW E36	(Finland) Paulus Perkkiö	4, 6 (Note: Perkkiö was entered as a wildcard for the round in Germany, but did not participate.)
BMW M2 G87	(Finland) Ville Kaukonen	4
BMW M2 G87	(Latvia) Alvis Ledskalniņš	5
BMW M2 G87	(Lithuania) Andrius Vasiliauskas	5
BMW E46	(Latvia) Daniels Baumanis	5
Toyota GT86	(Latvia) Mārtiņš Immermanis	5
BMW E46	(Finland) Matias Lindell	5
Toyota GT86	(Estonia) Siim Oskar Hääl	5
BMW E36	(Croatia) Adrian Petričević	6–7
Toyota GT86	(Ukraine) Artur Havrylenko	6
Volvo 745	(Sweden) Axel Hildebrand	6
Opel GT	(Poland) Dominik Kur	6
Nissan Silvia S15	(China) Jason Ye	6
BMW E36	(Turkey) Kemal Soylu	6
Nissan 200SX	(Germany) Max Heidrich	6
Nissan Silvia S15	(Poland) Mikołaj Zakrzewski	6–7
BMW E92 Eurofighter	(Finland) Pauli Laakso	6
BMW E36	(Austria) Peter Brolli	6
Nissan Silvia S15	(Thailand) Thanupat Lerttaweevit	6
BMW E92 M3	(Finland) Toni Ojatalo	6
Toyota GT86	(Kuwait) Ali Makhseed	7
BMW E92	(Czech Republic) Lukáš Souhrada	7
Toyota GR Supra	(Poland) Łukasz Kaliszewski	7
BMW M2 F87	(Greece) Stavros Gryllis	7

== Season report and results ==
=== Round 1, Vallelunga Circuit, Italy ===
In qualifying, Duane McKeever secured first place after scoring 95.5 points. He was tied on points with Conor Shanahan and Piotr Więcek, with positions decided by their second runs. Jakub Przygoński qualified fourth with 95 points, while Mika Keski-Korpi and Jack Shanahan completed the top six. The top ten drivers were separated by just over three points.

During the main competition, several drivers were eliminated early, including McKeever, who lost after snapping the rear suspension in his car during his chase against James Deane. In Top 4, Conor Shanahan defeated Więcek after a One More Time, while James Deane advanced to the final from the opposite bracket. Shanahan went on to win the final against Deane. Więcek secured third place by defeating Paweł Korpuliński in the third-place battle.

==== Qualifying ====
Pos.	Driver	1st run	2nd run	Final score
1	(Republic of Ireland) Duane Mckeever	90.0	95.5	95.5
2	(Republic of Ireland) Conor Shanahan	90.0	95.5	95.5
3	(Poland) Piotr Więcek	95.5	0	95.5
4	(Poland) Jakub Przygoński	90.2	95.0	95.0
5	(Finland) Mika Keski-Korpi	91.7	94.5	94.5
6	(Republic of Ireland) Jack Shanahan	89.5	94.5	94.5
7	(Finland) Lauri Heinonen	92.0	94.0	94.0
8	(Republic of Ireland) James Deane	93.5	93.0	93.5
9	(Norway) Simen Olsen	82.5	92.5	92.5
10	(Finland) Juha Rintanen	80.2	92.2	92.2
11	(Estonia) Kevin Pesur	88.7	91.7	91.7
12	(Poland) Pawel Korpuliński	90.7	91.5	91.5
13	(Estonia) Oliver Randalu	81.0	91.0	91.0
14	(Poland) Dawid Sposób	84.2	90.7	90.7
15	(Poland) Lukasz Tasiemski	88.5	90.5	90.5
16	(Republic of Ireland) Harry Kerr	90.2	80.0	90.2
17	(Czech Republic) Marco Zakouril	90.0	73.5	90.0
18	(Lithuania) Benediktas Cirba	90.0	0	90.0
19	(France) Jason Banet	0	89.5	89.5
20	(Latvia) Nikolass Bertans	86.5	88.0	88.0
21	(Poland) Jakub Król	84.5	88.0	88.0
22	(El Salvador) Nasser Alharbali	84.0	86.2	86.2
23	(Republic of Ireland) Conor Falvey	85.7	0	85.7
24	(Portugal) Diogo Correia	78.5	84.7	84.7
25	(Norway) Espen Rohde	62.0	84.2	84.2
26	(Cyprus) George Christoforou	75.7	84.0	84.0
27	(Finland) Jarkko Jylhä	83.7	82.2	83.7
28	(Finland) Juha Pöytälaakso	83.2	0	83.2
29	(Netherlands) Clint Van Oort	77.2	82.5	82.5
30	(Republic of Ireland) Dave Egan	68.0	80.7	80.7
31	(Hungary) Kevin Piskolty	79.2	75.5	79.2
32	(Finland) Teemu Asunmaa	77.0	78.5	78.5
33	(Switzerland) Yves Meyer	0	77.7	77.7
34	(Italy) Manuel Vacca	72.2	75.0	75.0
35	(Denmark) Mads Andreasen	72.5	73.7	73.7
36	(France) Anthony Rocci	72.2	73.7	73.7
37	(Ukraine) Konstantyn Shchurenko	0	71.0	71.0
38	(Egypt) Karim Hany	70.0	66.5	70.0
39	(Italy) Michele Landolfi	61.5	67.0	67.0
40	(Turkey) Enver Haskasap	64.7	0	64.7
41	(Italy) Riccardo Tonali	63.5	0	63.5

==== Top 32 ====
Top 32 bracket

Round of 32
**(Republic of Ireland) Duane McKeever**
(Finland) Teemu Asunmaa
(Republic of Ireland) Harry Kerr
**(Czech Republic) Marco Zakouril**
**(Republic of Ireland) James Deane**
(Norway) Espen Rohde
(Norway) Simen Olsen
**(Portugal) Diogo Correia**
**(Poland) Jakub Przygonski**
(Netherlands) Clint van Oort
(Estonia) Oliver Randalu
**(Latvia) Nikolass Bertans**
**(Finland) Mika Keski-Korpi**
(Finland) Juha Pöytälaakso
**(Poland) Paweł Korpuliński**
(Poland) Jakub Król
**(Republic of Ireland) Conor Shanahan**
(Hungary) Kevin Piskolty
(Poland) Łukasz Tasiemski
**(Lithuania) Benediktas Čirba**
**(Finland) Lauri Heinonen**
(Cyprus) George Christoforou
**(Finland) Juha Rintanen**
(Republic of Ireland) Conor Falvey
**(Poland) Piotr Więcek**
(Republic of Ireland) Dave Egan
(Poland) Dawid Sposob
**(France) Jason Banet**
**(Republic of Ireland) Jack Shanahan**
(Finland) Jarkko Jylhä
**(Estonia) Kevin Pesur**
(El Salvador) Nasser Alharbali

Round of 16
**(Republic of Ireland) Duane McKeever**
(Czech Republic) Marco Zakouril
**(Republic of Ireland) James Deane**
(Portugal) Diogo Correia
(Poland) Jakub Przygonski
**(Latvia) Nikolass Bertans**
(Finland) Mika Keski-Korpi
**(Poland) Paweł Korpuliński**
**(Republic of Ireland) Conor Shanahan**
(Lithuania) Benediktas Čirba
(Finland) Lauri Heinonen
**(Finland) Juha Rintanen**
**(Poland) Piotr Więcek**
(France) Jason Banet
(Republic of Ireland) Jack Shanahan
**(Estonia) Kevin Pesur**

Quarterfinals
(Republic of Ireland) Duane McKeever
**(Republic of Ireland) James Deane**
(Latvia) Nikolass Bertans
**(Poland) Paweł Korpuliński**
**(Republic of Ireland) Conor Shanahan**
(Finland) Juha Rintanen
**(Poland) Piotr Więcek**
(Estonia) Kevin Pesur

Semifinals
**(Republic of Ireland) James Deane**
(Poland) Paweł Korpuliński
**(Republic of Ireland) Conor Shanahan**
(Poland) Piotr Więcek

Final
(Republic of Ireland) James Deane
**(Republic of Ireland) Conor Shanahan**
Third place
(Poland) Paweł Korpuliński
**(Poland) Piotr Więcek**

Note: Winners of each battle are shown in **bold**.

==== Final results ====
Pos.	Driver	Points
1	(Republic of Ireland) Conor Shanahan	104
2	(Republic of Ireland) James Deane	88
3	(Poland) Piotr Więcek	76
4	(Poland) Paweł Korpuliński	64
5	(Republic of Ireland) Duane McKeever	48
6	(Finland) Juha Rintanen	48
7	(Latvia) Nikolass Bertans	48
8	(Estonia) Kevin Pesur	48
9	(Czech Republic) Marco Zakouril	32
10	(Portugal) Diogo Correia	32
11	(Poland) Jakub Przygonski	32
12	(Finland) Mika Keski-Korpi	32
13	(Lithuania) Benediktas Čirba	32
14	(Finland) Lauri Heinonen	32
15	(France) Jason Banet	32
16	(Republic of Ireland) Jack Shanahan	32
17	(Finland) Teemu Asunmaa	16
18	(Republic of Ireland) Harry Kerr	16
19	(Norway) Espen Rohde	16
20	(Norway) Simen Olsen	16
21	(Netherlands) Clint van Oort	16
22	(Estonia) Oliver Randalu	16
23	(Finland) Juha Pöytälaakso	16
24	(Poland) Jakub Król	16
25	(Hungary) Kevin Piskolty	16
26	(Poland) Łukasz Tasiemski	16
27	(Cyprus) George Christoforou	16
28	(Republic of Ireland) Conor Falvey	16
29	(Republic of Ireland) Dave Egan	16
30	(Poland) Dawid Sposob	16
31	(Finland) Jarkko Jylhä	16
32	(El Salvador) Nasser Alharbali	16
33	(Switzerland) Yves Meyer	0
34	(Italy) Manuel Vacca	0
35	(Denmark) Mads Andreasen	0
36	(France) Anthony Rocci	0
37	(Ukraine) Konstantyn Shchurenko	0
38	(Egypt) Karim Hany	0
39	(Italy) Michele Landolfi	0
40	(Turkey) Enver Haskasap	0
41	(Italy) Riccardo Tonali	0

=== Round 2, Circuito del Jarama, Spain ===
Piotr Więcek claimed victory after a challenging event that saw several top drivers eliminated by mechanical problems. His win marked a successful return to Spain, where last year he couldn't compete in the maint event after a crash with James Deane in qualifying showdown. Reigning champion Conor Shanahan advanced to the final after defeating Mika Keski-Korpi, while Keski-Korpi secured the first Drift Masters podium finish of his career by winning the third-place playoff against Deane. In the final, Więcek beat Shanahan to take the overall victory.

==== Qualifying ====
Pos.	Driver	1st run	2nd run	Final score
1	(Republic of Ireland) James Deane	97.0	96.5	97.0
2	(Poland) Pawel Korpuliński	88.7	96.2	96.2
3	(Finland) Mika Keski-Korpi	90.5	95.0	95.0
4	(Finland) Juha Rintanen	89.2	94.5	94.5
5	(Poland) Piotr Więcek	93.7	90.0	93.7
6	(Republic of Ireland) Duane McKeever	83.2	92.2	92.2
7	(Norway) Simen Olsen	81.5	92.0	92.0
8	(Poland) Jakub Przygoński	91.2	89.0	91.2
9	(Finland) Lauri Heinonen	87.5	90.5	90.5
10	(Republic of Ireland) Conor Shanahan	86.2	90.5	90.5
11	(El Salvador) Nasser Alharbali	85.7	90.2	90.2
12	(Estonia) Oliver Randalu	80.7	90.2	90.2
13	(Republic of Ireland) Jack Shanahan	89.7	90.0	90.0
14	(Poland) Dawid Sposób	78.5	90.0	90.0
15	(Estonia) Kevin Pesur	89.7	82.0	89.7
16	(Lithuania) Benediktas Cirba	89.5	82.7	89.5
17	(Norway) Espen Rohde	89.2	75.5	89.2
18	(Republic of Ireland) Conor Falvey	88.0	88.7	88.7
19	(France) Jason Banet	87.0	88.2	88.2
20	(Netherlands) Clint Van Oort	0	88.0	88.0
21	(Poland) Jakub Król	0	87.5	87.5
22	(Finland) Juha Pöytälaakso	86.7	83.7	86.7
23	(Portugal) Diogo Correia	86.7	81.0	86.7
24	(Portugal) Raman Kandratsenka	77.0	86.7	86.7
25	(Latvia) Nikolass Bertans	85.5	83.2	85.5
26	(Republic of Ireland) Alan Hynes	85.2	83.0	85.2
27	(Republic of Ireland) Harry Kerr	76.5	85.2	85.2
28	(Czech Republic) Marco Zakouril	83.5	83.2	83.5
29	(Switzerland) Yves Meyer	83.5	0	83.5
30	(Republic of Ireland) Dave Egan	67.7	82.5	82.5
31	(Finland) Jarkko Jylhä	81.7	65.2	81.7
32	(Hungary) Kevin Piskolty	78.2	78.2	78.2
33	(Egypt) Karim Hany	77.7	76.7	77.7
34	(Turkey) Enver Haskasap	74.5	77.7	77.7
35	(Finland) Teemu Asunmaa	77.0	69.7	77.0
36	(Ukraine) Igor Derenko	0	77.0	77.0
37	(Ukraine) Konstantyn Shchurenko	0	75.7	75.7
38	(Norway) Ole Peter Vatn	0	74.2	74.2
39	(Portugal) Joao Vieira	64.0	73.2	73.2
40	(Cyprus) George Christoforou	67.5	0	67.5
41	(Spain) Adrián Cabanillas	64.0	64.2	64.2
42	(Israel) Itay Sadeh	0	0	0
43	(Ukraine) Timur Lypskyi	0	0	0

==== Top 32 ====
Top 32 bracket

Round of 32
**(Republic of Ireland) James Deane**
(Hungary) Kevin Piskolty
(Lithuania) Benediktas Čirba
**(Norway) Espen Rohde**
(Poland) Jakub Przygonski
**(Latvia) Nikolass Bertans**
(Finland) Lauri Heinonen
**(Portugal) Raman Kandratsenka**
**(Finland) Juha Rintanen**
(Switzerland) Yves Meyer
**(Republic of Ireland) Jack Shanahan**
(Netherlands) Clint van Oort
**(Poland) Piotr Więcek**
(Czech Republic) Marco Zakouril
**(Estonia) Oliver Randalu**
(Poland) Jakub Król
**(Poland) Paweł Korpuliński**
(Finland) Jarkko Jylhä
(Estonia) Kevin Pesur
**(Republic of Ireland) Conor Falvey**
(Norway) Simen Olsen
**(Republic of Ireland) Alan Hynes**
**(Republic of Ireland) Conor Shanahan**
(Portugal) Diogo Correia
**(Finland) Mika Keski-Korpi**
(Republic of Ireland) Dave Egan
**(Poland) Dawid Sposob**
(France) Jason Banet
**(Republic of Ireland) Duane McKeever**
(Republic of Ireland) Harry Kerr
**(El Salvador) Nasser Alharbali**
(Finland) Juha Pöytälaakso

Round of 16
**(Republic of Ireland) James Deane**
(Norway) Espen Rohde
(Portugal) Raman Kandratsenka
**(Latvia) Nikolass Bertans**
(Finland) Juha Rintanen
**(Republic of Ireland) Jack Shanahan**
**(Poland) Piotr Więcek**
(Estonia) Oliver Randalu
**(Poland) Paweł Korpuliński**
(Republic of Ireland) Conor Falvey
**(Republic of Ireland) Conor Shanahan**
(Republic of Ireland) Alan Hynes
**(Finland) Mika Keski-Korpi**
(Poland) Dawid Sposob
(Republic of Ireland) Duane McKeever
**(El Salvador) Nasser Alharbali**

Quarterfinals
**(Republic of Ireland) James Deane**
(Latvia) Nikolass Bertans
**(Poland) Piotr Więcek**
(Republic of Ireland) Jack Shanahan
(Poland) Paweł Korpuliński
**(Republic of Ireland) Conor Shanahan**
**(Finland) Mika Keski-Korpi**
(El Salvador) Nasser Alharbali

Semifinals
(Republic of Ireland) James Deane
**(Poland) Piotr Więcek**
(Finland) Mika Keski-Korpi
**(Republic of Ireland) Conor Shanahan**

Final
**(Poland) Piotr Więcek**
(Republic of Ireland) Conor Shanahan
Third place
(Republic of Ireland) James Deane
**(Finland) Mika Keski-Korpi**

Note: Winners of each battle are shown in **bold**.

==== Final results ====
Pos.	Driver	Points
1	(Poland) Piotr Więcek	104
2	(Republic of Ireland) Conor Shanahan	88
3	(Finland) Mika Keski-Korpi	82
4	(Republic of Ireland) James Deane	72
5	(Poland) Paweł Korpuliński	55
6	(El Salvador) Nasser Alharbali	48
7	(Republic of Ireland) Jack Shanahan	48
8	(Latvia) Nikolass Bertans	48
9	(Finland) Juha Rintanen	37
10	(Republic of Ireland) Duane McKeever	35
11	(Estonia) Oliver Randalu	32
12	(Poland) Dawid Sposob	32
13	(Norway) Espen Rohde	32
14	(Republic of Ireland) Conor Falvey	32
15	(Portugal) Raman Kandratsenka	32
16	(Republic of Ireland) Alan Hynes	32
17	(Norway) Simen Olsen	18
18	(Poland) Jakub Przygonski	17
19	(Finland) Lauri Heinonen	16
20	(Estonia) Kevin Pesur	16
21	(Lithuania) Benediktas Čirba	16
22	(France) Jason Banet	16
23	(Netherlands) Clint van Oort	16
24	(Poland) Jakub Król	16
25	(Finland) Juha Pöytälaakso	16
26	(Portugal) Diogo Correia	16
27	(Republic of Ireland) Harry Kerr	16
28	(Czech Republic) Marco Zakouril	16
29	(Switzerland) Yves Meyer	16
30	(Republic of Ireland) Dave Egan	16
31	(Finland) Jarkko Jylhä	16
32	(Hungary) Kevin Piskolty	16
33	(Egypt) Karim Hany	0
34	(Turkey) Enver Haskasap	0
35	(Finland) Teemu Asunmaa	0
36	(Spain) Igor Derenko	0
37	(Ukraine) Konstantyn Shchurenko	0
38	(Norway) Ole Peter Vatn	0
39	(Portugal) João Vieira	0
40	(Cyprus) George Christoforou	0
41	(Spain) Adrián Cabanillas	0
42	(Israel) Itay Sadeh	0
43	(Ukraine) Timur Lypskyi	0

=== Round 3, Mondello Park, Ireland ===
==== Qualifying ====
Pos.	Driver	Run 1	Run 2	Best
1	(Republic of Ireland) Conor Shanahan	97.5	88.5	97.5
2	(Republic of Ireland) Jack Shanahan	95.7	96.5	96.5
3	(Republic of Ireland) James Deane	95.7	95.2	95.7
4	(Republic of Ireland) Duane McKeever	94.2	95.2	95.2
5	(Poland) Pawel Korpulinski	92.2	94.0	94.0
6	(Finland) Mika Keski-Korpi	94.0	90.5	94.0
7	(France) Jason Banet	93.7	93.2	93.7
8	(Finland) Lauri Heinonen	92.7	91.0	92.7
9	(El Salvador) Nasser Alharbali	91.0	92.5	92.5
10	(Poland) Dawid Sposob	87.2	92.2	92.2
11	(Poland) Piotr Wiecek	91.5	0	91.5
12	(Hungary) Kevin Piskolty	90.7	89.7	90.7
13	(Lithuania) Benediktas Čirba	90.0	84.2	90.0
14	(Finland) Teemu Asunmaa	81.7	89.2	89.2
15	(Estonia) Kevin Pesur	88.7	89.0	89.0
16	(Israel) Itay Sadeh	81.2	89.0	89.0
17	(Finland) Jarkko Jylhä	0	88.2	88.2
18	(Poland) Jakub Krol	88.0	84.7	88.0
19	(Finland) Juha Pöytälaakso	84.7	87.7	87.7
20	(Czech Republic) Marco Zakouril	87.5	76.7	87.5
21	(Poland) Jakub Przygonski	87.2	85.5	87.2
22	(Republic of Ireland) Conor Falvey	86.7	84.5	86.7
23	(Latvia) Nikolass Bertans	86.7	64.2	86.7
24	(Republic of Ireland) Harry Kerr	86.5	76.2	86.5
25	(Norway) Espen Rohde	78.0	85.2	85.2
26	(Finland) Juha Rintanen	0	85.2	85.2
27	(Republic of Ireland) Alan Hynes	80.5	84.0	84.0
28	(Estonia) Oliver Randalu	82.5	83.2	83.2
29	(Portugal) Diogo Correia	0	83.2	83.2
30	(Egypt) Karim Hany	76.7	81.7	81.7
31	(Republic of Ireland) Dylan Garvey	81.7	74.7	81.7
32	(Republic of Ireland) Dave Egan	71.5	81.0	81.0
33	(Norway) Simen Olsen	80.7	78.0	80.7
34	(Republic of Ireland) Alex Butler	66.5	80.7	80.7
35	(Turkey) Enver Haskasap	0	80.7	80.7
36	(Cyprus) George Christoforou	74.2	79.0	79.0
37	(Republic of Ireland) Dylan Wilson	62.7	78.2	78.2
38	(Ukraine) Kostiantyn Shchurenko	0	74.2	74.2
39	(Poland) Jakub Krzyszczak	66.5	73.0	73.0
40	(Republic of Ireland) Steven McConnell	72.5	0	72.5
41	(Republic of Ireland) Callum Coogan	0	40.5	40.5
42	(Netherlands) Clint van Oort	0	0	0

==== Top 32 ====
Top 32 bracket

Round of 32
(Republic of Ireland) Conor Shanahan
**(Republic of Ireland) Dave Egan**
**(Israel) Itay Sadeh**
(Finland) Jarkko Jylhä
**(Finland) Lauri Heinonen**
(Norway) Espen Rohde
**(El Salvador) Nasser Alharbali**
(Republic of Ireland) Harry Kerr
**(Republic of Ireland) Duane McKeever**
(Portugal) Diogo Correia
**(Lithuania) Benediktas Čirba**
(Czech Republic) Marco Zakouril
**(Poland) Paweł Korpuliński**
(Estonia) Oliver Randalu
(Hungary) Kevin Piskolty
**(Poland) Jakub Przygonski**
**(Republic of Ireland) Jack Shanahan**
(Republic of Ireland) Dylan Garvey
**(Estonia) Kevin Pesur**
(Poland) Jakub Król
**(France) Jason Banet**
(Finland) Juha Rintanen
(Poland) Dawid Sposob
**(Latvia) Nikolass Bertans**
**(Republic of Ireland) James Deane**
(Egypt) Karim Hany
**(Finland) Teemu Asunmaa**
(Finland) Juha Pöytälaakso
**(Finland) Mika Keski-Korpi**
(Republic of Ireland) Alan Hynes
(Poland) Piotr Więcek
**(Republic of Ireland) Conor Falvey**

Round of 16
(Republic of Ireland) Dave Egan
**(Israel) Itay Sadeh**
(Finland) Lauri Heinonen
**(El Salvador) Nasser Alharbali**
**(Republic of Ireland) Duane McKeever**
(Lithuania) Benediktas Čirba
**(Poland) Paweł Korpuliński**
(Poland) Jakub Przygonski
(Republic of Ireland) Jack Shanahan
**(Estonia) Kevin Pesur**
(France) Jason Banet
**(Latvia) Nikolass Bertans**
**(Republic of Ireland) James Deane**
(Finland) Teemu Asunmaa
(Finland) Mika Keski-Korpi
**(Republic of Ireland) Conor Falvey**

Quarterfinals
(Israel) Itay Sadeh
**(El Salvador) Nasser Alharbali**
(Republic of Ireland) Duane McKeever
**(Poland) Paweł Korpuliński**
**(Estonia) Kevin Pesur**
(Latvia) Nikolass Bertans
(Republic of Ireland) James Deane
**(Republic of Ireland) Conor Falvey**

Semifinals
(El Salvador) Nasser Alharbali
**(Poland) Paweł Korpuliński**
(Estonia) Kevin Pesur
**(Republic of Ireland) Conor Falvey**

Final
**(Poland) Paweł Korpuliński**
(Republic of Ireland) Conor Falvey
Third place
(El Salvador) Nasser Alharbali
**(Estonia) Kevin Pesur**

Note: Winners of each battle are shown in **bold**.

==== Final results ====
Pos.	Driver	Points
1	(Poland) Paweł Korpuliński	104
2	(Republic of Ireland) Conor Falvey	88
3	(Estonia) Kevin Pesur	76
4	(El Salvador) Nasser Alharbali	64
5	(Republic of Ireland) James Deane	54
6	(Republic of Ireland) Duane McKeever	53
7	(Israel) Itay Sadeh	48
8	(Latvia) Nikolass Bertans	48
9	(Republic of Ireland) Jack Shanahan	39
10	(Finland) Mika Keski-Korpi	35
11	(France) Jason Banet	34
12	(Finland) Lauri Heinonen	33
13	(Lithuania) Benediktas Čirba	32
14	(Finland) Teemu Asunmaa	32
15	(Poland) Jakub Przygonski	32
16	(Republic of Ireland) Dave Egan	32
17	(Republic of Ireland) Conor Shanahan	24
18	(Poland) Dawid Sposob	16
19	(Poland) Piotr Więcek	16
20	(Hungary) Kevin Piskolty	16
21	(Finland) Jarkko Jylhä	16
22	(Poland) Jakub Król	16
23	(Finland) Juha Pöytälaakso	16
24	(Czech Republic) Marco Zakouril	16
25	(Republic of Ireland) Harry Kerr	16
26	(Norway) Espen Rohde	16
27	(Finland) Juha Rintanen	16
28	(Republic of Ireland) Alan Hynes	16
29	(Estonia) Oliver Randalu	16
30	(Portugal) Diogo Correia	16
31	(Egypt) Karim Hany	16
32	(Republic of Ireland) Dylan Garvey	16
33	(Norway) Simen Olsen	0
34	(Republic of Ireland) Alex Butler	0
35	(Turkey) Enver Haskasap	0
36	(Cyprus) George Christoforou	0
37	(United Kingdom) Dylan Wilson	0
38	(Ukraine) Kostiantyn Shchurenko	0
39	(Poland) Jakub Krzyszczak	0
40	(United Kingdom) Steven McConnell	0
41	(Republic of Ireland) Callum Coogan	0
42	(Netherlands) Clint van Oort	0

=== Round 4, Ahvenisto Race Circuit, Finland ===
Round 4 of Drift Masters season 2026 was held at a new venue, Ahvenisto Race Circuit in Hämeenlinna, Finland. Piotr Wiecek was the winner of qualifying with top 5 qualifiers finishing within 0,2 points. In the top 32, Jack Shanahan won his first race in over three years beating Benediktas Cirba in the final in front of 12,732 spectators. Kristiina "Krisse" Aalto made history being the first female driver in Drift Masters history to qualify into top 32 bracket. Aalto scored 89.0 points in the qualifying finishing 21st. Aalto then drove against fellow finn Jarkko Jylhä in the round of 32 with Jylhä advancing into top 16.

==== Qualifying ====
Pos.	Driver	Run 1	Run 2	Best
1	(Poland) Piotr Więcek	90.0	95.7	95.7
2	(Poland) Paweł Korpuliński	83.7	95.7	95.7
3	(Republic of Ireland) Jack Shanahan	92.5	95.5	95.5
4	(Republic of Ireland) Conor Falvey	90.2	95.5	95.5
5	(Finland) Mika Keski-Korpi	95.5	0	95.5
6	(Republic of Ireland) James Deane	93.0	95.2	95.2
7	(Portugal) Diogo Correia	86.7	95.0	95.0
8	(Republic of Ireland) Duane McKeever	94.7	—	94.7
9	(Republic of Ireland) Conor Shanahan	94.2	89.5	94.2
10	(Estonia) Oliver Randalu	93.0	94.0	94.0
11	(El Salvador) Nasser Alharbali	93.5	93.7	93.7
12	(Finland) Jarkko Jylhä	93.7	86.2	93.7
13	(Hungary) Kevin Piskolty	89.0	93.5	93.5
14	(Finland) Kim Björklund	85.0	93.2	93.2
15	(Czech Republic) Marco Zakouril	90.5	93.0	93.0
16	(Estonia) Kevin Pesur	84.0	92.7	92.7
17	(Estonia) Graig Meriloo	65.5	92.7	92.7
18	(Republic of Ireland) Alan Hynes	92.7	0	92.7
19	(France) Jason Banet	83.7	92.0	92.0
20	(Finland) Paulus Perkkiö	91.7	85.2	91.7
21	(Finland) Kristiina Aalto	78.5	89.0	89.0
22	(Finland) Teemu Asunmaa	88.7	87.2	88.7
23	(Poland) Jakub Król	85.0	88.5	88.5
24	(Lithuania) Benediktas Čirba	88.5	0	88.5
25	(Norway) Simen Olsen	88.2	87.2	88.2
26	(Poland) Jakub Przygonski	82.2	88.2	88.2
27	(Poland) Dawid Sposob	88.2	0	88.2
28	(Finland) Juha Rintanen	87.7	82.0	87.7
29	(Israel) Itay Sadeh	87.7	0	87.7
30	(Denmark) Mads Andreasen	82.7	87.5	87.5
31	(Netherlands) Clint van Oort	87.5	80.2	87.5
32	(Latvia) Nikolass Bertans	81.2	86.7	86.7
33	(Egypt) Karim Hany	81.7	86.5	86.5
34	(Republic of Ireland) Harry Kerr	86.2	83.7	86.2
35	(Republic of Ireland) Dave Egan	72.5	86.2	86.2
36	(Norway) Espen Rohde	85.0	84.5	85.0
37	(Turkey) Enver Haskasap	77.5	84.5	84.5
38	(Finland) Lauri Heinonen	84.2	83.2	84.2
39	(Cyprus) George Christoforou	82.2	80.5	82.2
40	(Finland) Ville Kaukonen	77.2	0	77.2
41	(Ukraine) Konstantyn Shchurenko	76.5	75.5	76.5
42	(Finland) Juha Pöytälaakso	0	—	0

==== Top 32 ====
Top 32 bracket

Round of 32
**(Poland) Piotr Więcek**
(Latvia) Nikolass Bertans
**(Estonia) Kevin Pesur**
(Estonia) Graig Meriloo
(Republic of Ireland) Duane McKeever
**(Norway) Simen Olsen**
(Republic of Ireland) Conor Shanahan
**(Lithuania) Benediktas Čirba**
(Republic of Ireland) Conor Falvey
**(Israel) Itay Sadeh**
**(Hungary) Kevin Piskolty**
(Finland) Paulus Perkkiö
(Finland) Mika Keski-Korpi
**(Finland) Juha Rintanen**
**(Finland) Jarkko Jylhä**
(Finland) Kristiina Aalto
**(Poland) Paweł Korpuliński**
(Netherlands) Clint van Oort
**(Republic of Ireland) Alan Hynes**
(Czech Republic) Marco Zakouril
(Portugal) Diogo Correia
**(Poland) Jakub Przygonski**
**(Estonia) Oliver Randalu**
(Poland) Jakub Król
**(Republic of Ireland) Jack Shanahan**
(Denmark) Mads Andreasen
**(France) Jason Banet**
(Finland) Kim Björklund
**(Republic of Ireland) James Deane**
(Poland) Dawid Sposob
**(El Salvador) Nasser Alharbali**
(Finland) Teemu Asunmaa

Round of 16
**(Poland) Piotr Więcek**
(Estonia) Kevin Pesur
(Norway) Simen Olsen
**(Lithuania) Benediktas Čirba**
(Israel) Itay Sadeh
**(Hungary) Kevin Piskolty**
**(Finland) Juha Rintanen**
(Finland) Jarkko Jylhä
**(Poland) Paweł Korpuliński**
(Republic of Ireland) Alan Hynes
(Poland) Jakub Przygonski
**(Estonia) Oliver Randalu**
**(Republic of Ireland) Jack Shanahan**
(France) Jason Banet
**(Republic of Ireland) James Deane**
(El Salvador) Nasser Alharbali

Quarterfinals
(Poland) Piotr Więcek
**(Lithuania) Benediktas Čirba**
(Hungary) Kevin Piskolty
**(Finland) Juha Rintanen**
(Poland) Paweł Korpuliński
**(Estonia) Oliver Randalu**
**(Republic of Ireland) Jack Shanahan**
(Republic of Ireland) James Deane

Semifinals
(Finland) Juha Rintanen
**(Lithuania) Benediktas Čirba**
**(Republic of Ireland) Jack Shanahan**
(Estonia) Oliver Randalu

Final
(Lithuania) Benediktas Čirba
**(Republic of Ireland) Jack Shanahan**
Third place
**(Estonia) Oliver Randalu**
(Finland) Juha Rintanen

Note: Winners of each battle are shown in **bold**.

==== Final results ====
Pos.	Driver	Qual.	Points
1	(Republic of Ireland) Jack Shanahan	3	100+6
2	(Lithuania) Benediktas Čirba	24	88
3	(Estonia) Oliver Randalu	10	76
4	(Finland) Juha Rintanen	28	64
5	(Poland) Piotr Więcek	1	48+8
6	(Poland) Paweł Korpuliński	2	48+7
7	(Republic of Ireland) James Deane	6	48+3
8	(Hungary) Kevin Piskolty	13	48
9	(El Salvador) Nasser Alharbali	11	32
10	(Finland) Jarkko Jylhä	12	32
11	(Estonia) Kevin Pesur	16	32
12	(Republic of Ireland) Alan Hynes	18	32
13	(France) Jason Banet	19	32
14	(Norway) Simen Olsen	25	32
15	(Poland) Jakub Przygonski	26	32
16	(Israel) Itay Sadeh	29	32
17	(Republic of Ireland) Conor Falvey	4	16+5
18	(Finland) Mika Keski-Korpi	5	16+4
19	(Portugal) Diogo Correia	7	16+2
20	(Republic of Ireland) Duane McKeever	8	16+1
21	(Republic of Ireland) Conor Shanahan	9	16
22	(Finland) Kim Björklund	14	16
23	(Czech Republic) Marco Zakouril	15	16
24	(Estonia) Graig Meriloo	17	16
25	(Finland) Paulus Perkkiö	20	16
26	(Finland) Kristiina Aalto	21	16
27	(Finland) Teemu Asunmaa	22	16
28	(Poland) Jakub Król	23	16
29	(Poland) Dawid Sposob	27	16
30	(Denmark) Mads Andreasen	30	16
31	(Netherlands) Clint van Oort	31	16
32	(Latvia) Nikolass Bertans	32	16
33	(Egypt) Karim Hany	33	0
34	(Republic of Ireland) Harry Kerr	34	0
35	(Republic of Ireland) Dave Egan	35	0
36	(Norway) Espen Rohde	36	0
37	(Turkey) Enver Haskasap	37	0
38	(Finland) Lauri Heinonen	38	0
39	(Cyprus) George Christoforou	39	0
40	(Finland) Ville Kaukonen	40	0
41	(Ukraine) Konstantyn Shchurenko	41	0
42	(Finland) Juha Pöytälaakso	42	0

=== Round 5, Bikernieku Trase, Latvia ===
Piotr Więcek won the qualifying with a 96-point run. Paweł Korpuliński took his second victory of the season and the King of Riga title, extending his championship lead as title contenders Conor and Jack Shanahan along with James Deane were all eliminated during Top 16 or earlier. Kevin Piskolty finished 2nd in his first Drift Masters final while Conor Falvey took his second podium of the season with 3rd after a serious crash for Więcek during the playoff.

==== Qualifying ====
Pos.	Driver	Run 1	Run 2	Best
1	(Poland) Piotr Więcek	88.7	96.0	96.0
2	(Republic of Ireland) Conor Shanahan	93.7	90.2	93.7
3	(Republic of Ireland) Conor Falvey	88.0	93.5	93.5
4	(Finland) Lauri Heinonen	93.0	87.7	93.0
5	(Poland) Paweł Korpuliński	92.5	89.7	92.5
6	(Finland) Jarkko Jylhä	89.0	92.5	92.5
7	(Hungary) Kevin Piskolty	83.7	92.5	92.5
8	(Israel) Itay Sadeh	91.5	88.0	91.5
9	(Finland) Juha Rintanen	91.5	73.5	91.5
10	(Estonia) Kevin Pesur	91.5	0	91.5
11	(Poland) Dawid Sposob	89.0	90.5	90.5
12	(El Salvador) Nasser Alharbali	76.0	90.0	90.0
13	(Republic of Ireland) James Deane	89.5	89.7	89.7
14	(Republic of Ireland) Jack Shanahan	89.5	86.5	89.5
15	(Poland) Jakub Król	89.5	84.7	89.5
16	(Republic of Ireland) Alan Hynes	88.0	88.5	88.5
17	(Finland) Teemu Asunmaa	75.2	88.2	88.2
18	(Estonia) Oliver Randalu	86.0	87.2	87.2
19	(Republic of Ireland) Duane McKeever	0	87.0	87.0
20	(Czech Republic) Marco Zakouril	—	86.0	86.0
21	(Latvia) Nikolass Bertans	85.5	78.0	85.5
22	(Estonia) Siim-Oskar Hääl	85.2	83.0	85.2
23	(Poland) Jakub Przygonski	81.5	84.2	84.2
24	(Lithuania) Benediktas Čirba	80.2	84.2	84.2
25	(Latvia) Mārtiņš Immermanis	83.2	83.5	83.5
26	(Finland) Mika Keski-Korpi	72.5	81.2	81.2
27	(Portugal) Raman Kandratsenka	79.7	81.0	81.0
28	(Latvia) Daniels Baumanis	0	80.5	80.5
29	(Republic of Ireland) Dave Egan	80.2	76.5	80.2
30	(Norway) Espen Rohde	0	79.7	79.7
31	(Switzerland) Yves Meyer	0	79.2	79.2
32	(Norway) Simen Olsen	76.7	77.7	77.7
33	(Finland) Juha Pöytälaakso	77.5	67.0	77.5
34	(France) Jason Banet	77.2	66.5	77.2
35	(Finland) Matias Lindell	75.0	76.7	76.7
36	(Egypt) Karim Hany	66.0	76.5	76.5
37	(Republic of Ireland) Harry Kerr	71.2	74.5	74.5
38	(Lithuania) Andrius Vasiliauskas	0	74.2	74.2
39	(Latvia) Alvis Ledskalniņš	0	72.5	72.5
40	(Turkey) Enver Haskasap	59.0	66.0	66.0
41	(Netherlands) Clint van Oort	65.5	60.5	65.5
42	(Ukraine) Kostiantyn Shchurenko	0	56.0	56.0
43	(Cyprus) George Christoforou	0	—	0
44	(Portugal) Diogo Correia	0	—	0

==== Top 32 ====
Top 32 bracket

Round of 32
(Poland) **Piotr Więcek**
(Norway) Simen Olsen
(Republic of Ireland) Alan Hynes
(Finland) **Teemu Asunmaa**
(Israel) **Itay Sadeh**
(Latvia) Mārtiņš Immermanis
(Finland) Juha Rintanen
(Lithuania) **Benediktas Čirba**
(Finland) **Lauri Heinonen**
(Republic of Ireland) Dave Egan
(Republic of Ireland) **James Deane**
(Czech Republic) Marco Zakouril
(Poland) **Paweł Korpuliński**
(Latvia) Daniels Baumanis
(El Salvador) **Nasser Alharbali**
(Latvia) Nikolass Bertans
(Republic of Ireland) **Conor Shanahan**
(Switzerland) Yves Meyer
(Poland) Jakub Król
(Estonia) **Oliver Randalu**
(Hungary) **Kevin Piskolty**
(Finland) Mika Keski-Korpi
(Estonia) Kevin Pesur
(Poland) **Jakub Przygonski**
(Republic of Ireland) **Conor Falvey**
(Norway) Espen Rohde
(Republic of Ireland) Jack Shanahan
(Republic of Ireland) **Duane McKeever**
(Finland) **Jarkko Jylhä**
(Portugal) Raman Kandratsenka
(Poland) Dawid Sposob
(Estonia) **Siim-Oskar Hääl**

Round of 16
(Poland) **Piotr Więcek**
(Finland) Teemu Asunmaa
(Israel) Itay Sadeh
(Lithuania) **Benediktas Čirba**
(Finland) **Lauri Heinonen**
(Republic of Ireland) James Deane
(Poland) **Paweł Korpuliński**
(El Salvador) Nasser Alharbali
(Republic of Ireland) Conor Shanahan
(Estonia) **Oliver Randalu**
(Hungary) **Kevin Piskolty**
(Poland) Jakub Przygonski
(Republic of Ireland) **Conor Falvey**
(Republic of Ireland) Duane McKeever
(Finland) Jarkko Jylhä
(Estonia) **Siim-Oskar Hääl**

Quarterfinals
(Poland) **Piotr Więcek**
(Lithuania) Benediktas Čirba
(Finland) Lauri Heinonen
(Poland) **Paweł Korpuliński**
(Estonia) Oliver Randalu
(Hungary) **Kevin Piskolty**
(Republic of Ireland) **Conor Falvey**
(Estonia) Siim-Oskar Hääl

Semifinals
(Poland) Piotr Więcek
(Poland) **Paweł Korpuliński**
(Hungary) **Kevin Piskolty**
(Republic of Ireland) Conor Falvey

Final
(Poland) **Paweł Korpuliński**
(Hungary) Kevin Piskolty
Third place
(Poland) Piotr Więcek
(Republic of Ireland) **Conor Falvey**

Winners of each battle are shown in **bold**.

==== Final results ====
Pos.	Driver	Qual.	Points
1	(Poland) Paweł Korpuliński	5	100+4
2	(Hungary) Kevin Piskolty	7	88+2
3	(Republic of Ireland) Conor Falvey	3	76+5
4	(Poland) Piotr Więcek	1	64+8
5	(Finland) Lauri Heinonen	4	48+5
6	(Estonia) Oliver Randalu	18	48
7	(Estonia) Siim-Oskar Hääl	22	48
8	(Lithuania) Benediktas Čirba	24	48
9	(Republic of Ireland) Conor Shanahan	2	32+7
10	(Finland) Jarkko Jylhä	6	32+3
11	(Israel) Itay Sadeh	8	32+1
12	(El Salvador) Nasser Alharbali	12	32
13	(Republic of Ireland) James Deane	13	32
14	(Finland) Teemu Asunmaa	17	32
15	(Republic of Ireland) Duane McKeever	19	32
16	(Poland) Jakub Przygonski	23	32
17	(Finland) Juha Rintanen	9	16
18	(Estonia) Kevin Pesur	10	16
19	(Poland) Dawid Sposob	11	16
20	(Republic of Ireland) Jack Shanahan	14	16
21	(Poland) Jakub Król	15	16
22	(Republic of Ireland) Alan Hynes	16	16
23	(Czech Republic) Marco Zakouril	20	16
24	(Latvia) Nikolass Bertans	21	16
25	(Latvia) Mārtiņš Immermanis	25	16
26	(Finland) Mika Keski-Korpi	26	16
27	(Portugal) Raman Kandratsenka	27	16
28	(Latvia) Daniels Baumanis	28	16
29	(Republic of Ireland) Dave Egan	29	16
30	(Norway) Espen Rohde	30	16
31	(Switzerland) Yves Meyer	31	16
32	(Norway) Simen Olsen	32	16
33	(Finland) Juha Pöytälaakso	33	0
34	(France) Jason Banet	34	0
35	(Finland) Matias Lindell	35	0
36	(Egypt) Karim Hany	36	0
37	(Republic of Ireland) Harry Kerr	37	0
38	(Lithuania) Andrius Vasiliauskas	38	0
39	(Latvia) Alvis Ledskalniņš	39	0
40	(Turkey) Enver Haskasap	40	0
41	(Netherlands) Clint van Oort	41	0
42	(Ukraine) Kostiantyn Shchurenko	42	0
43	(Cyprus) George Christoforou	43	0
44	(Portugal) Diogo Correia	44	0

=== Round 6, Ferropolis, Germany ===
Conor Shanahan won the qualifying with a 98-point run, with 23 drivers scoring 90 or more points for their runs. Piotr Więcek took his second victory of the season and retook the championship lead from Paweł Korpuliński, who was eliminated by Shanahan during Top 16. Jason Banet made his first semifinal, but suffered a clutch failure during the playoff and placed 4th. Four drivers – Więcek, Korpuliński, Shanahan and James Deane – remained in mathematical contention for the title.

==== Qualifying ====
Pos.	Driver	Run 1	Run 2	Best
1	(Republic of Ireland) Conor Shanahan	96	98	98
2	(Republic of Ireland) James Deane	91.7	98	98
3	(Poland) Piotr Więcek	92.5	96	96
4	(Republic of Ireland) Jack Shanahan	0	96	96
5	(Latvia) Nikolass Bertans	85.2	95	95
6	(Republic of Ireland) Duane McKeever	94.7	94.7	94.7
7	(Norway) Espen Rohde	94.7	89	94.7
8	(Portugal) Diogo Correia	87.7	94.7	94.7
9	(Estonia) Kevin Pesur	87.5	94.5	94.5
10	(Estonia) Oliver Randalu	93.7	90.7	93.7
11	(Poland) Jakub Przygoński	93.7	87.7	93.7
12	(Republic of Ireland) Alan Hynes	87	93.5	93.5
13	(Poland) Jakub Król	93	89.5	93
14	(Finland) Juha Pöytälaakso	91.7	92.7	92.7
15	(France) Jason Banet	92.5	91.5	92.5
16	(Poland) Paweł Korpuliński	90	92.5	92.5
17	(Poland) Mikołaj Zakrzewski	92.2	86.7	92.2
18	(Czech Republic) Marco Zakouřil	90.2	92	92
19	(Finland) Mika Keski-Korpi	91.7	91.7	91.7
20	(Hungary) Kevin Piskolty	90.7	91.7	91.7
21	(Norway) Simen Olsen	84.7	91.7	91.7
22	(Finland) Jarkko Jylhä	85.7	91,5	91,5
23	(Spain) Igor Derenko	88.2	90	90
24	(Finland) Juha Rintanen	89.7	89.7	89.7
25	(Republic of Ireland) Dylan Garvey	89	0	89
26	(Poland) Dawid Sposób	88	84.7	88
27	(Finland) Teemu Asunmaa	88	79.7	88
28	(Israel) Itay Sadeh	87.7	81	87.7
29	(Republic of Ireland) Conor Falvey	85	87.5	87.5
30	(Republic of Ireland) Harry Kerr	86	68.5	86
31	(Netherlands) Clint van Oort	0	86	86
32	(Turkey) Enver Haskasap	68.7	85	85
33	(Republic of Ireland) Dave Egan	0	84.7	84.7
34	(Finland) Toni Ojatalo	82	78	82
35	(El Salvador) Nasser Alharbali	81.7	78.2	81.7
36	(Cyprus) George Christoforou	56.5	81.5	81.5
37	(Sweden) Axel Hildebrand	73.5	79	79
38	(China) Jason Ye	73.2	78.5	78.5
39	(Ukraine) Konstantyn Shchurenko	77	77.5	77.5
40	(Poland) Dominik Kur	69	76.7	76.7
41	(Ukraine) Timur Lypskyi	64	75.5	75.5
42	(Finland) Pauli Laakso	0	75.2	75.2
43	(Egypt) Karim Hany	69.5	72	72
44	(Lithuania) Benediktas Cirba	0	70	70
45	(Croatia) Adrian Petričević	68.5	65.2	68.5
46	(Switzerland) Yves Meyer	68.5	0	68.5
47	(Ukraine) Artur Havrylenko	67.2	44	67.2
48	(Thailand) Thanupat Lerttaweevit	62	0	62
49	(Turkey) Kemal Soylu	58	0	58
50	(Austria) Peter Brolli	0	50.5	50.5
51	(Germany) Max Heidrich	0	0	0

==== Top 32 ====
Top 32 bracket

Round of 32
(Republic of Ireland) **Conor Shanahan**
(Turkey) Enver Haskasap
(Poland) **Paweł Korpuliński**
(Poland) Mikołaj Zakrzewski
(Portugal) **Diogo Correia**
(Republic of Ireland) Dylan Garvey
(Estonia) **Kevin Pesur**
(Finland) Juha Rintanen
(Republic of Ireland) **Jack Shanahan**
(Republic of Ireland) Conor Falvey
(Poland) **Jakub Król**
(Hungary) Kevin Piskolty
(Latvia) **Nikolass Bertans**
(Israel) Itay Sadeh
(Republic of Ireland) **Alan Hynes**
(Norway) Simen Olsen
(Republic of Ireland) **James Deane**
(Netherlands) Clint van Oort
(France) **Jason Banet**
(Czech Republic) Marco Zakouřil
(Norway) Espen Rohde
(Poland) **Dawid Sposób**
(Estonia) **Oliver Randalu**
(Spain) Igor Derenko
(Poland) **Piotr Więcek**
(Republic of Ireland) Harry Kerr
(Finland) Juha Pöytälaakso
(Finland) **Mika Keski-Korpi**
(Republic of Ireland) **Duane McKeever**
(Finland) Teemu Asunmaa
(Poland) Jakub Przygoński
(Finland) **Jarkko Jylhä**

Round of 16
(Republic of Ireland) **Conor Shanahan**
(Poland) Paweł Korpuliński
(Portugal) Diogo Correia
(Estonia) **Kevin Pesur**
(Republic of Ireland) **Jack Shanahan**
(Poland) Jakub Król
(Latvia) **Nikolass Bertans**
(Republic of Ireland) Alan Hynes
(Republic of Ireland) James Deane
(France) **Jason Banet**
(Poland) Dawid Sposób
(Estonia) **Oliver Randalu**
(Poland) **Piotr Więcek**
(Finland) Mika Keski-Korpi
(Republic of Ireland) **Duane McKeever**
(Finland) Jarkko Jylhä

Quarterfinals
(Republic of Ireland) **Conor Shanahan**
(Estonia) Kevin Pesur
(Republic of Ireland) **Jack Shanahan**
(Latvia) Nikolass Bertans
(France) **Jason Banet**
(Estonia) Oliver Randalu
(Poland) **Piotr Więcek**
(Republic of Ireland) Duane McKeever

Semifinals
(Republic of Ireland) **Conor Shanahan**
(Republic of Ireland) Jack Shanahan
(France) Jason Banet
(Poland) **Piotr Więcek**

Final
(Republic of Ireland) Conor Shanahan
(Poland) **Piotr Więcek**
Third place
(Republic of Ireland) **Jack Shanahan**
(France) Jason Banet

Winners of each battle are shown in **bold**.

== Championship standings ==
=== Scoring system ===
The Qualifying Showdown was cancelled for 2026. The top 8 in qualifying score points as following:

Position	**1st**	**2nd**	**3rd**	**4th**	**5th**	**6th**	**7th**	**8th**
Points	8	7	6	5	4	3	2	1

In the Competition Stage, drivers score points as following:

Position	**1st**	**2nd**	**3rd**	**4th**	**5th–8th**	**9th–16th**	**17th–32nd**
Points	100	88	76	64	48	32	16

=== Driver standings ===
Pos.	Driver	(Italy) R1	(Spain) R2	(Republic of Ireland) R3	(Finland) R4	(Latvia) R5	(Germany) R6	(Poland) R7	Points
1	(Poland) Paweł Korpuliński	4	5^{2}	1^{5}	6^{2}	1^{5}	13	2^{2}	509
2	(Republic of Ireland) Conor Shanahan	1^{2}	2	**17^{1}**	21	9^{2}	**2^{1}**	1^{5}	474
3	(Poland) Piotr Więcek	3^{3}	1^{5}	19	**5^{1}**	**4^{1}**	1^{3}	15	468
4	(Republic of Ireland) James Deane	2^{8}	**4^{1}**	4^{3}	7^{6}	13	9^{2}	3^{1}	421
5	(Republic of Ireland) Jack Shanahan	11^{6}	7	9^{2}	1^{3}	20	3^{4}	14	357
6	(Republic of Ireland) Duane McKeever	**5^{1}**	10^{6}	4^{4}	20^{8}	15	6^{6}	4^{3}	314
7	(Republic of Ireland) Conor Falvey	24	14	2	17^{4}	3^{3}	29	10	287
8	(Estonia) Oliver Randalu	18	11	29	3	6	8	7^{8}	285
9	(Estonia) Kevin Pesur	7	20	3	11	18	7	11	268
10	(Finland) Mika Keski-Korpi	10^{5}	3^{3}	10^{6}	18^{5}	26	14	9^{7}	255
11	(Latvia) Nikolass Bertans	8	8	8	32	24	5^{5}	22	244
12	(Lithuania) Benediktas Cirba	14	21	13	2	8	44	28	232
13	(Hungary) Kevin Piskolty	31	32	20	8	2^{7}	22	30	218
14	(Finland) Juha Rintanen	6	9^{4}	27	4	17	25	19	213
15	(El Salvador) Nasser Alharbali	23	6	4	9	12	35	23	208
16	(Finland) Jarkko Jylhä	27	31	21	10	10^{6}	15	6^{6}	198
17	(Poland) Jakub Przygoński	9^{4}	18^{8}	15	15	16	18	12	198
18	(France) Jason Banet	15	22	11^{7}	13	34	4	27	194
19	(Poland) Jakub Król	22	24	22	28	21	12	8	160
20	(Poland) Dawid Sposób	19	12	18	29	19	16	16	160
21	(Norway) Simen Olsen RY	17	17^{7}	33	14	32	23	5^{4}	151
22	(Portugal) Diogo Correia	16	26	30	19^{7}	44	10^{8}	13	147
23	(Israel) Itay Sadeh	DNS	42	7	16	11^{8}	28	26	145
24	(Republic of Ireland) Alan Hynes		16	28	12	22	11	18	144
25	(Finland) Lauri Heinonen	12^{7}	19	12^{8}	38	5^{4}			136
26	(Czech Republic) Marco Zakouřil	13	28	24	23	23	21	42	112
27	(Finland) Teemu Asunmaa R	32	35	14	27	14	27	44	112
28	(Norway) Espen Rohde	25	13	26	36	30	17^{7}	34	98
29	(Republic of Ireland) Dave Egan	30	30	16	35	29	33	39	80
30	(Finland) Juha Pöytälaakso	28	25	23	42	33	19	20	80
31	(Republic of Ireland) Harry Kerr R	21	27	25	34	37	30	35	64
32	(Netherlands) Clint van Oort	29	23	42	31	41	31	36	64
33	(Estonia) Siim Oskar Hääl W					7			48
34	(Portugal) Raman Kandratsenka W		15			27			48
35	(Switzerland) Yves Meyer	33	29			31	46	21	48
36	(Poland) Mikołaj Zakrzewski W						20	24	32
37	(Poland) Łukasz Tasiemski W	20						32	32
38	(Ukraine) Igor Derenko W		36				24	29	32
39	(Cyprus) George Christoforou	26	40	36	39	43	36	31	32
40	(Republic of Ireland) Dylan Garvey W			32			26		32
41	(Kuwait) Ali Makhseed W							17	16
42	(Finland) Kim Björklund W				22				16
43	(Estonia) Graig Meriloo W				24				16
44	(Finland) Paulius Perkkiö W				25				16
45	(Latvia) Mārtiņš Immermanis W					25			16
46	(Poland) Łukasz Kaliszewski W							25	16
47	(Finland) Kristiina Aalto W				26				16
48	(Latvia) Daniels Baumanis W					28			16
49	(Denmark) Mads Andreasen W	35			30				16
50	(Egypt) Karim Hany R	38	33	31	33	36	43	38	16
51	(Turkey) Enver Haskasap	40	34	35	37	40	32	41	16
NC	(Ukraine) Konstantyn Shchurenko R	37	37	38	41	42	39	43	0

In-line notation
Blank	Didn't participate
	Place in qualifying (Did not qualify)
^{Superscript number}	Place in qualifying (Top 8)
**Bold**	Top qualifier
W	Wildcard
R	Rookie
RY	Rookie of the Year

=== Nations Cup standings ===
Nation Cup points are awarded each round to the two drivers with the highest classified finish for each nation.

Pos	Nation	(Italy) R1	(Spain) R2	(Finland) R3	(Republic of Ireland) R4	(Latvia) R5	(Germany) R6	(Poland) R7	Points
1	Ireland	1	2	2	1	3	2	1	1141
1	Ireland	2	4	5	7	9	3	3	1141
2	Poland	3	1	1	5	1	1	2	1009
2	Poland	4	5	15	6	4	12	8	1009
3	Finland	6	3	10	4	5	14	6	604
3	Finland	10	9	12	10	10	15	9	604
4	Estonia	7	11	3	3	6	7	7	585
4	Estonia	18	20	29	11	7	8	11	585
5	Latvia	8	8	8	32	24	5	22	260
5	Latvia					25			260
6	Norway	17	13	26	14	30	17	5	249
6	Norway	25	17	33	36	32	23	34	249
7	Lithuania	14	21	13	2	8	44	28	232
7	Lithuania					38			232
8	Hungary	31	32	20	8	2	22	30	218
9	El Salvador	23	6	4	9	12	35	23	208
10	Portugal	16	15	30	19	27	10	13	195
10	Portugal		26			44			195
11	France	14	22	11	13	34	4	27	194
11	France	36							194
12	Israel	DNS	42	7	16	11	28	26	145
13	Czech Republic	13	28	24	23	23	21	42	112
14	Netherlands	29	23	42	31	41	31	36	64
15	Switzerland	33	29			31	46	21	48
16	Spain		41				24	29	32
16	Cyprus	26	40	36	39	43	36	31	32
18	Kuwait							17	16
18	Denmark	35			30				16
18	Egypt	38	33	31	33	36	43	38	16
18	Turkey	40	34	35	37	40	32	41	16
18	Turkey						49		16
