= Piotr Więcek =

Polish drifting driver (born 1990)

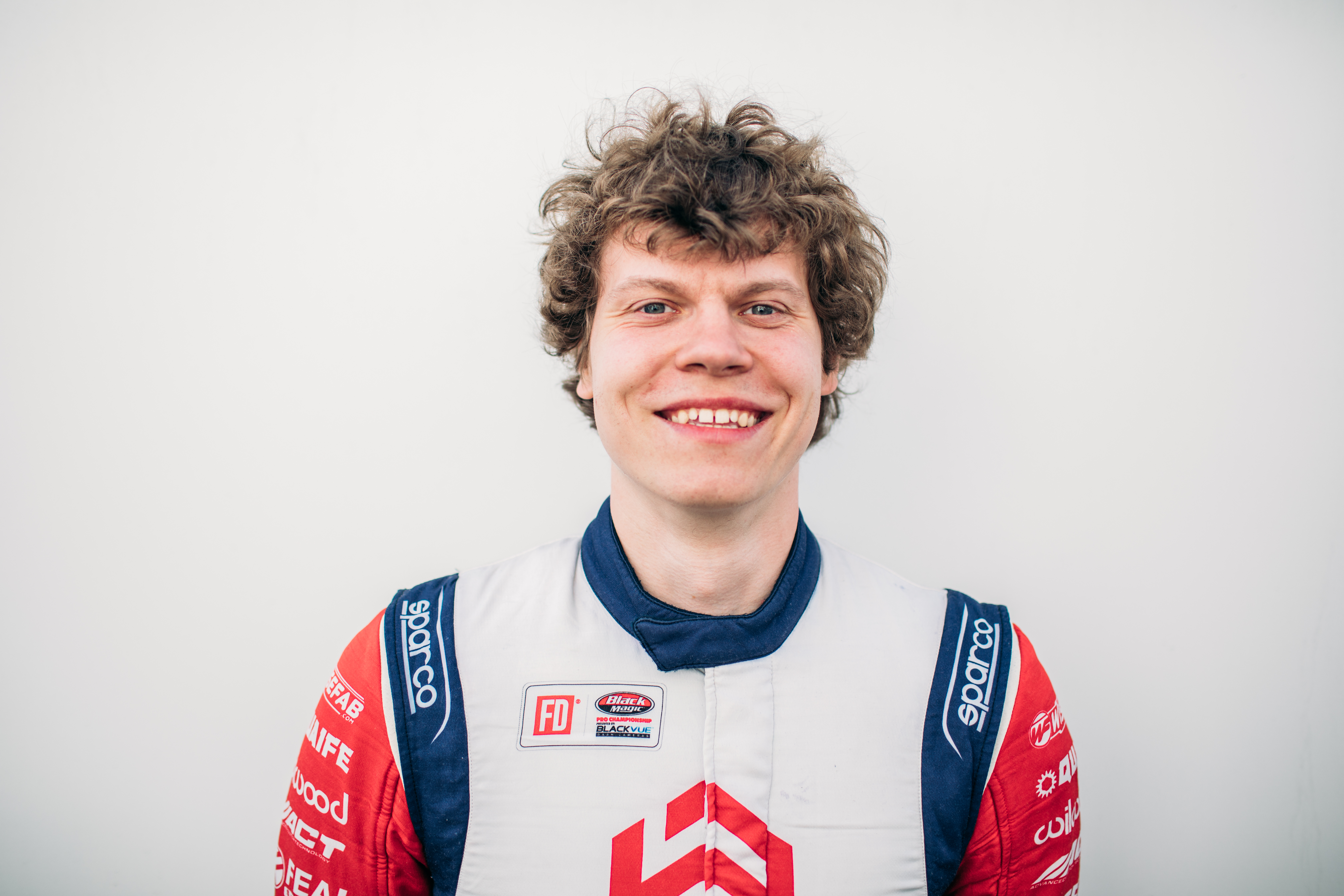
- Piotr Więcek in Worthouse. Drift Team colors

Personal information
- Nationality: Poland
- Born: 27 July 1990 (age 35) Płock, Poland

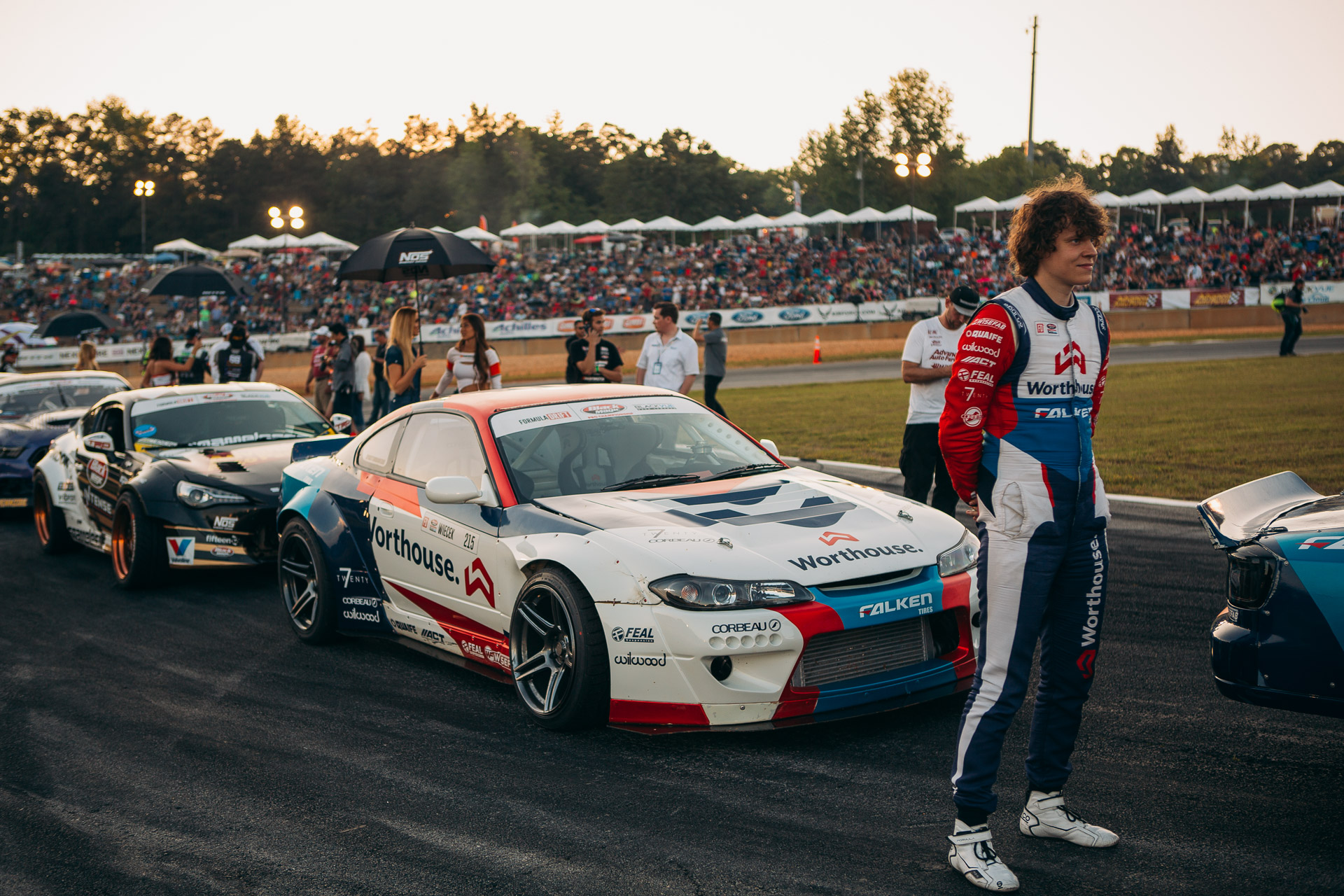
Piotr Więcek during the Formula Drift competition, Atlanta 2017

Piotr Więcek (born 27 July 1990 in Płock, Poland) is a Polish drifting driver, currently a Worthouse Drift Team member.

== Driving career ==
Więcek began drifting in 2010, signing a contract the following year with the Budmat Auto RB Team, which later became Budmat Auto Drift Team. Więcek competed for three titles in the European Drift Masters Grand Prix in 2014, 2015 and 2016.

In 2017, Więcek became a member of the Worthouse Drift Team. Together with their teammate James Deane, they began racing in Formula DRIFT (FD), considered to be the best drifting league in the world. Events take place in the United States. Piotr finished the 2017 season in Formula DRIFT as Rookie of the Year, and as one of only three drivers in the history of FD to win a single round in the first season of starts.

In 2020, the Worthouse Drift Team withdrew from competition due to COVID-19 restrictions. In the same statement, it was announced that Deane would no longer be competing with Worthouse.

Więcek continued to win the Drift Masters European Championship consecutively in 2021 and 2022.

Więcek is associated with yellow Nissans, mainly the 200SX and Skyline R34 models.

== Sporting achievements ==
=== Season 2011 ===
5th place - Polish Drifting Championships - Poznan Track (Nissan 200SX S14)

=== Season 2012 ===
4th place - Polish Drifting Championships - Płock Orlen Arena (Nissan 200SX S14)

6th place - Polish Drifting Championships - Kielce, Copper Mountain Track (Nissan 200SX S14)

=== Season 2013 ===
2nd place - Polish Drifting Championships - Poznan Track (Nissan 200SX S14)

=== Season 2014 ===
1st place - Drift Allstars - London Stratford Olympic Ground (Nissan 200SX S14)

4th place - Polish Drifting Championships - Kielce, Copper Mountain Track (Nissan 200SX S14)

1st place - Polish Drifting Championships - Poznan Track (Nissan 200SX S14)

1st place in the general classification - Drift Masters Grand Prix (Nissan 200SX)

=== Season 2015 ===
1st place in the general classification - Drift Masters Grand Prix (Nissan 200SX)

=== Season 2016 ===
2nd place - Drift Allstars - Germany Eurospeedway-Lausitz (Nissan Skyline)

1st place in the general classification - Drift Masters Grand Prix (Nissan 200SX)

=== Season 2017 ===
3rd place - 3rd round of Drift Masters Grand Prix (Nissan Skyline)

1st place - 8th round of Formula Drift Irwindale, California, USA (Nissan S15)

=== Season 2018 ===
3rd place - 1st round of Formula Drift Long Beach, California, USA (Nissan S15)

1st place - 1st round of Motegi Super Drift Challenge 2018, Long Beach, California, USA (Nissan S15)

1st place - 1st round of Motegi Super Drift Challenge 2018, Long Beach, California, USA (Nissan S15)

5th place - 2nd round Formula Drift Orlando, Florida, USA (Nissan S15)

4th place - 3rd round of Formula Drift Atlanta, Georgia, USA (Nissan S15)

3rd place - 5th round of Formula Drift Monroe, Washington, USA (Nissan S15)

4th place - 6th round of Formula Drift, St. Louis, Illinois, USA (Nissan S15)

4th place - Red Bull Drift Shifters, Liverpool, England (Nissan Skyline)

=== Season 2020 ===
2nd place - 1st round of Drift Masters European Championship (King of Riga), Riga, Latvia (Nissan S15)

=== Season 2021 ===
1st place - 1st round of Drift Masters European Championship, Greinbach, Austria (Nissan S15)

1st place - 2nd round of Drift Masters European Championship, Greinbach, Austria (Nissan S15)

2nd place - 3rd round of Drift Masters European Championship, Riga, Latvia (Nissan S15)

1st place - 4th round of Drift Masters European Championship, Riga, Latvia (Nissan S15)
