= Autodrom Jastrząb =

Coordinates: 51.2638498°N 20.9282493°E

Autodrom Jastrząb is a Drivers Training Center located 20km south of Radom, Poland. Built in 2013, it is one of the latest and most modern tracks in the country.

The track's name, "Jastrząb" means Hawk in Polish, and is used as track's symbol in marketing.

== Facilities ==
The main track is composed of asphalt-paved surface of 2400 meters with the full length of routes being 3500 meters; at its most narrow point the track is just 10 meters across. Overall, the facility takes up space of over 20 hectares.

The track is available for both cars and motorcycles. It hosts both training activities and events.
