= Jack Shanahan =

Irish professional drift driver

- Nationality: (Republic of Ireland) Irish
- Born: 3 August 2001 (age 25) Cork, Ireland

British Drift Championship, Irish Drift Championship career
- Current team: The Shanahans

Jack Shanahan (born 3 August 1999) is an Irish professional drift driver from Cork. Shanahan was the 2016 and 2017 champion of the British Drift Championship and also won the Russian Drift Series in 2021.

== Career ==
Shanahan began competing in the semi pro class of the Irish Drift Championship at the age of 13, in a Nissan 180SX, and competed in select rounds of the Drift Allstars European series. In 2014, he won his first major event, the British Drift Championship event at Lydden Hill in a new car, a BMW-powered Nissan 200SX, and finished third at the Drift Allstars event at Mantorp Park in Sweden.

Shanahan's 2015 BDC title triumph at the age of sixteen made him the youngest driver to win a major drifting title.

In 2025, Shanahan began competing in Formula D and was rookie of the year, earning his first victory at the final round in Long Beach, California.

== Family ==
Conor Shanahan
- Nationality: (Republic of Ireland) Irish
- Born: Cork, Ireland
- Current team: The Shanahans

Shanahan's younger brother, Conor Shanahan, is also a drifter and competed in the Pro class of the British Drift Championship in 2017 after graduating from the Pro-Am class in 2016. In the 2016 season, the brothers shared the same car, a Nissan 180SX. In 2017, Conor Shanahan appeared on The Grand Tour television series.
