= Drift Allstars =

Professional drifting series

- Category: Drifting
- Country: Ireland
- Inaugural season: 2008
- Drivers' champion: James Deane
- Official website: Official website

Drift Allstars Championship – is a professional drifting series that on average 50 drivers and teams, from at least 16 nations compete in a 10 stop Grand Prix series driving powerful and modified saloon cars. The Series was part of a hybrid investment and sponsorship deal in 2014 when from 2014 and until the end of 2015, it was backed by Extreme and Alistair Gosling and his professional management team.

The 2014 Championship kicked off at the Olympic Park, London in May and finished in Athens, Greece in September. Video clip from London

For 2015 and beyond the new management team of Extreme and Niall Gunn were working with new promoters around the world to bring the Drift Allstars brand to arenas, tracks, stadiums and city centers and have added music to the line-up with both bands and DJs being part of the offer.

== Media Coverage ==
Based on the public interest social media is being used extensively to grow the brand and championship. The Facebook fan base is 1.44 million liking the brand, up from 171,000 in 2014.

TV - The 2014 8 x 30 minute part Drift Allstars TV show has been and is broadcast across 39 countries into 95 million household's on the following networks Pan Europe EXTREME TV, UK/Ireland – BT Sports, Bulgaria – BNT, Finland – MTV3, Italy – Fox Sports, Greece – Fox Sports, Cyprus – Fox Sports, Norway – Viasat, Sweden – Viasat, Lithuania – Viasat Baltics, Latvia – Viasat Baltics, Estonia – Viasat Baltics, Romania – Digi Sport, Russia – Auto Plus, UAE – OSN Network, Turkey – Fox Sports, USA – MAV TV, New Zealand – TV3, Asia – Eurosport Asia, Thailand – True Visions

== History ==
It was Formerly and originally known as JDM Allstars when Niall Gunn formed it in 2008, with an inaugural structure of 3 events named the JDM Allstars TRIPLE Crown Series. These 3 lead events showcased at Teesside Autodrome, Lydden Hill Circuit and Europe's first street course at Wembley Stadium. Between early 2014 and to the end of 2015 Alistair Gosling and Extreme, who are backed by Kleinwort Benson Bank were supporting running and investing in Drift Allstars to take the brand to the next level.

== Series champions ==
Year	Driver	Car	Team
2008	Eric O'Sullivan	Toyota Corolla AE86	Rockstar Energy Drink
2009	Remmo Niezen	BMW M3 E30	Team Falken Europe
2010	Luke Fink	Nissan Silvia PS13	Low Brain Drifters
2011	James Deane	Nissan Silvia PS13	Low Brain Drifters
2012	Alan Sinnott	Toyota Corolla AE86/Nissan 200SX S14A	Nexen Tyres
2013	Juha Rintanen	Nissan S14A 2JZ	Nexen Tyres
2014	James Deane	Nissan 200SX	Falken Tires
2015	James Deane	Nissan 200SX	Falken Tires
2016	James Deane	Nissan 200SX	Falken Tires

== See also ==
- D1 Grand Prix
- Formula D
- British Drift Championship
