= Nissan 200SX =

The Nissan 200SX (originally Datsun 200SX until the early 1980s) is an automobile nameplate that has been used on various export specification Nissan automobiles between 1975 and 2002.

== Nissan Silvia based ==
Between 1975 and 2002, Nissan retailed the Silvia as the 200SX in many export markets. Six generations were made in both coupé and hatchback body styles, with new models released in 1979, 1984, 1989, 1993, and 1999. These cars received a variety of different nameplates depending on the importer.

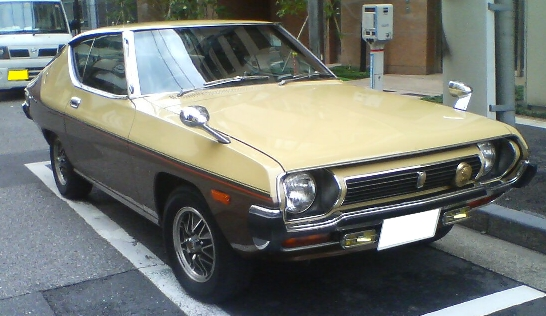
First generation (S10; 1975–1979)
(North America)

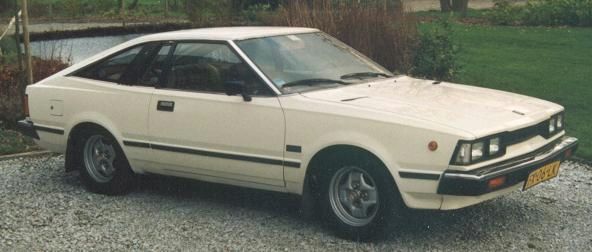
Second generation (S110; 1979–1984)
(most export markets)

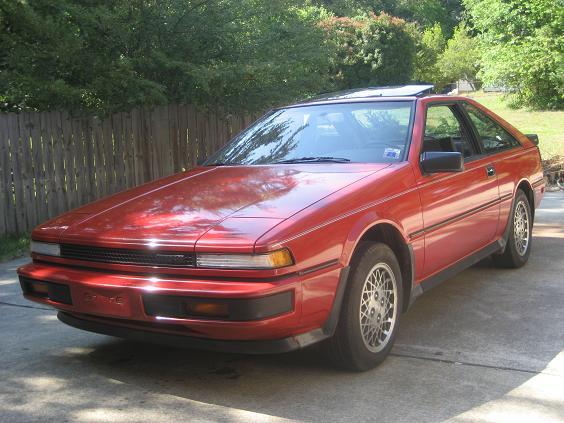
Third generation (S12; 1984–1989)
(North America)

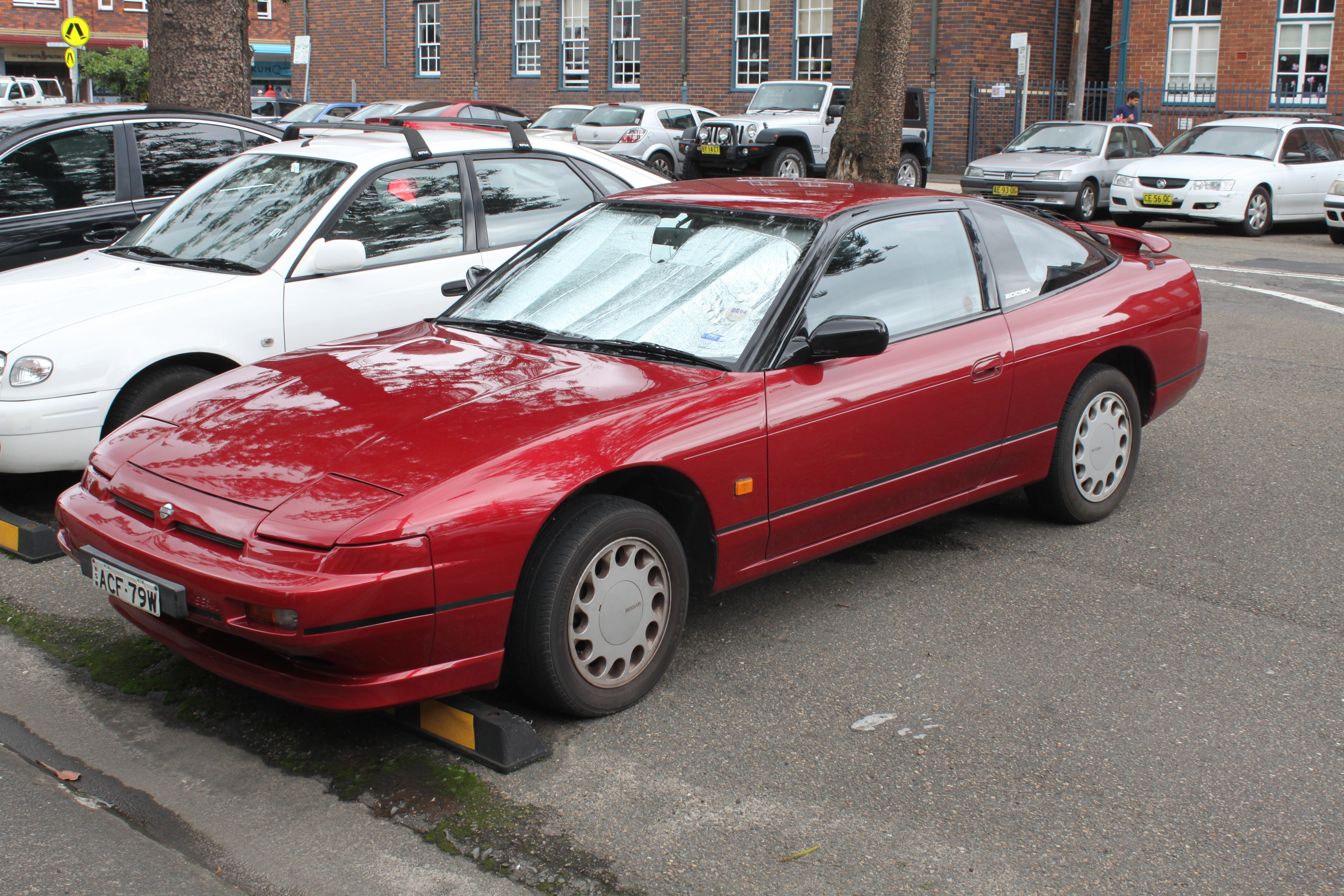
Fourth generation (S13; 1989–1993)
(Europe, Hong Kong, Thailand, South Africa, New Zealand)

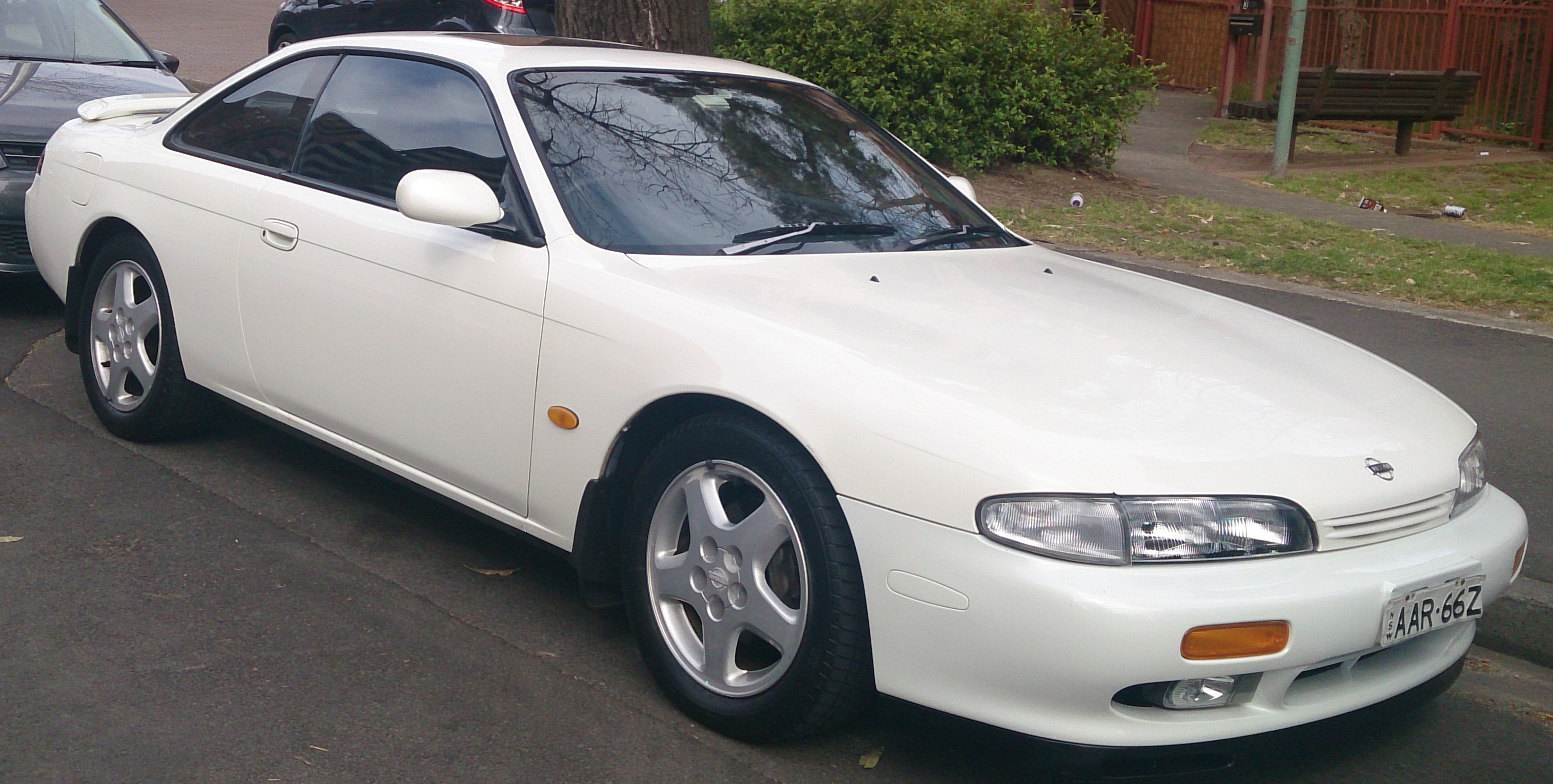
Fifth generation (S14; 1993–1999)
(most export markets)

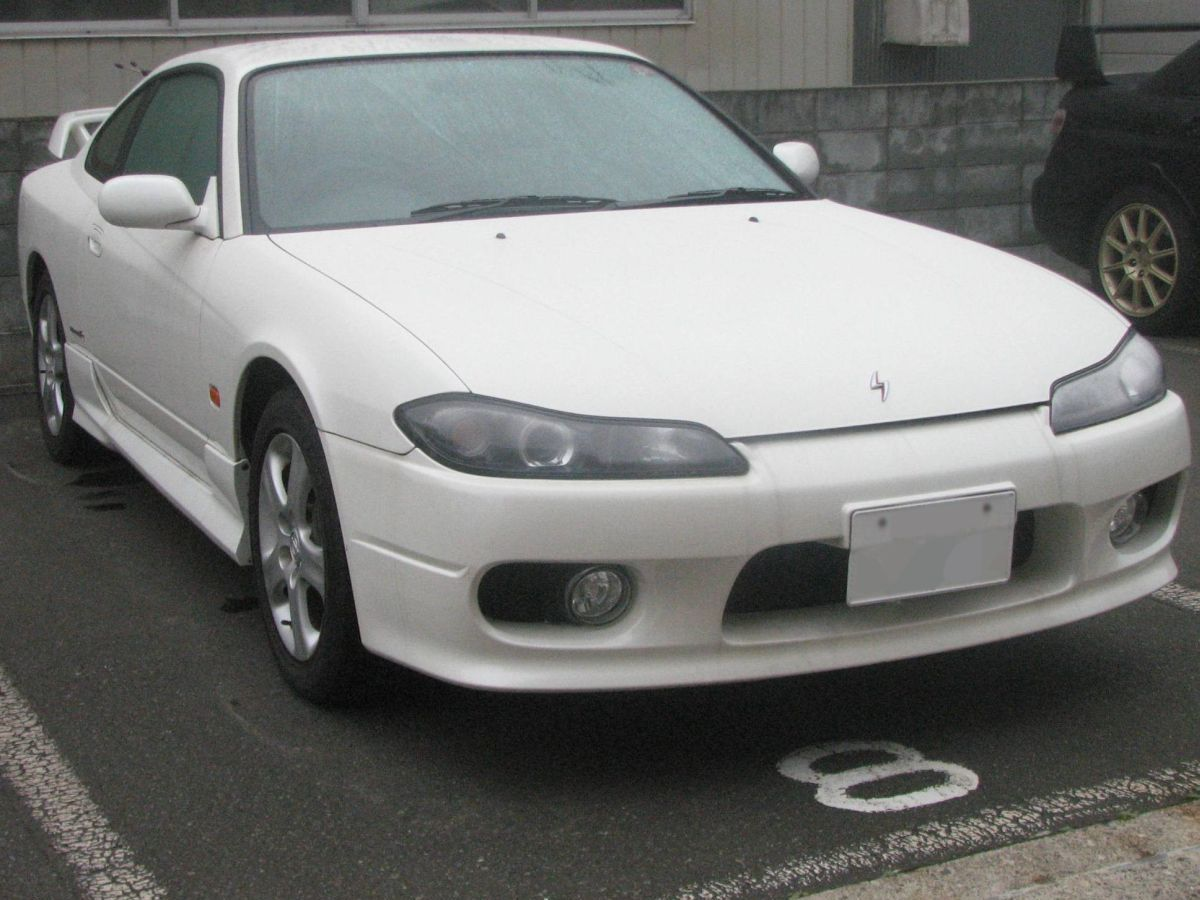
Sixth generation (S15; 1999–2002)
(Australia, New Zealand)

== Nissan Lucino based ==
Between 1995 and 1998, Nissan retailed the Lucino coupe as the 200SX in the United States and Canada.

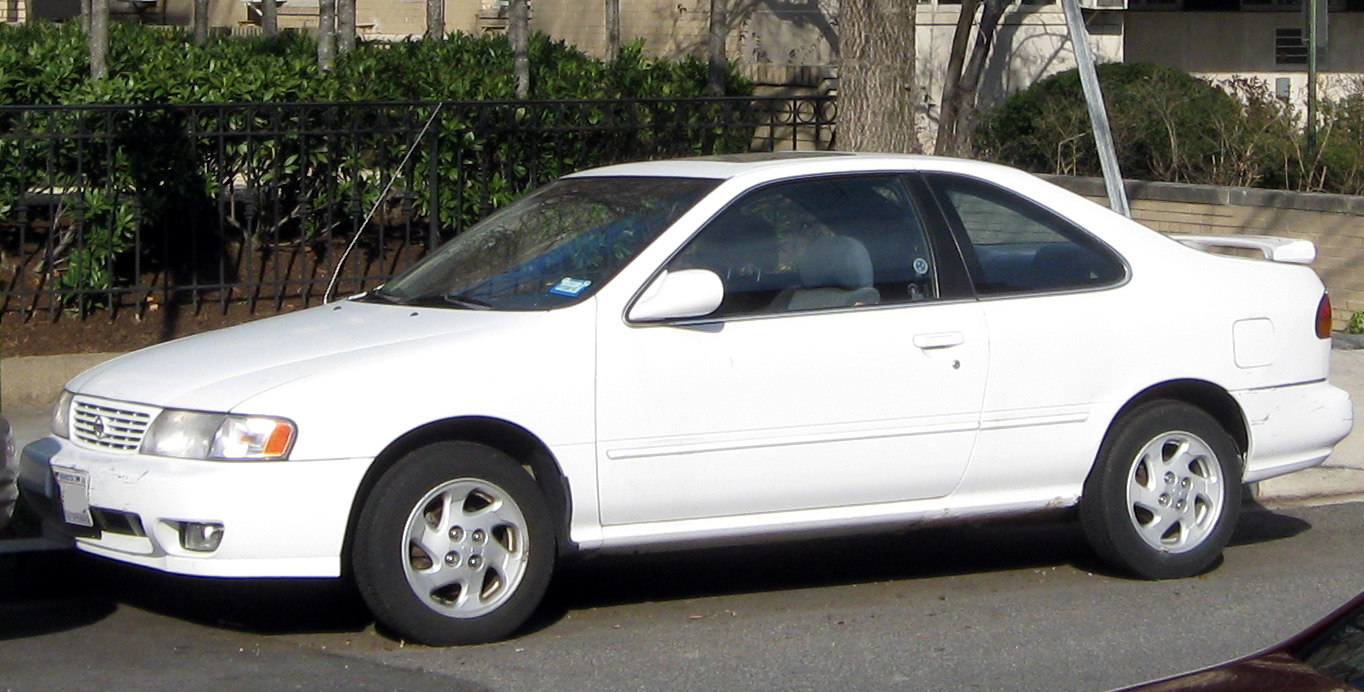
B14 (1995–1998)

== See also ==
- Nissan 180SX
- Nissan 240SX
