= Toyota Mark X =

Mid-size car manufactured by Toyota

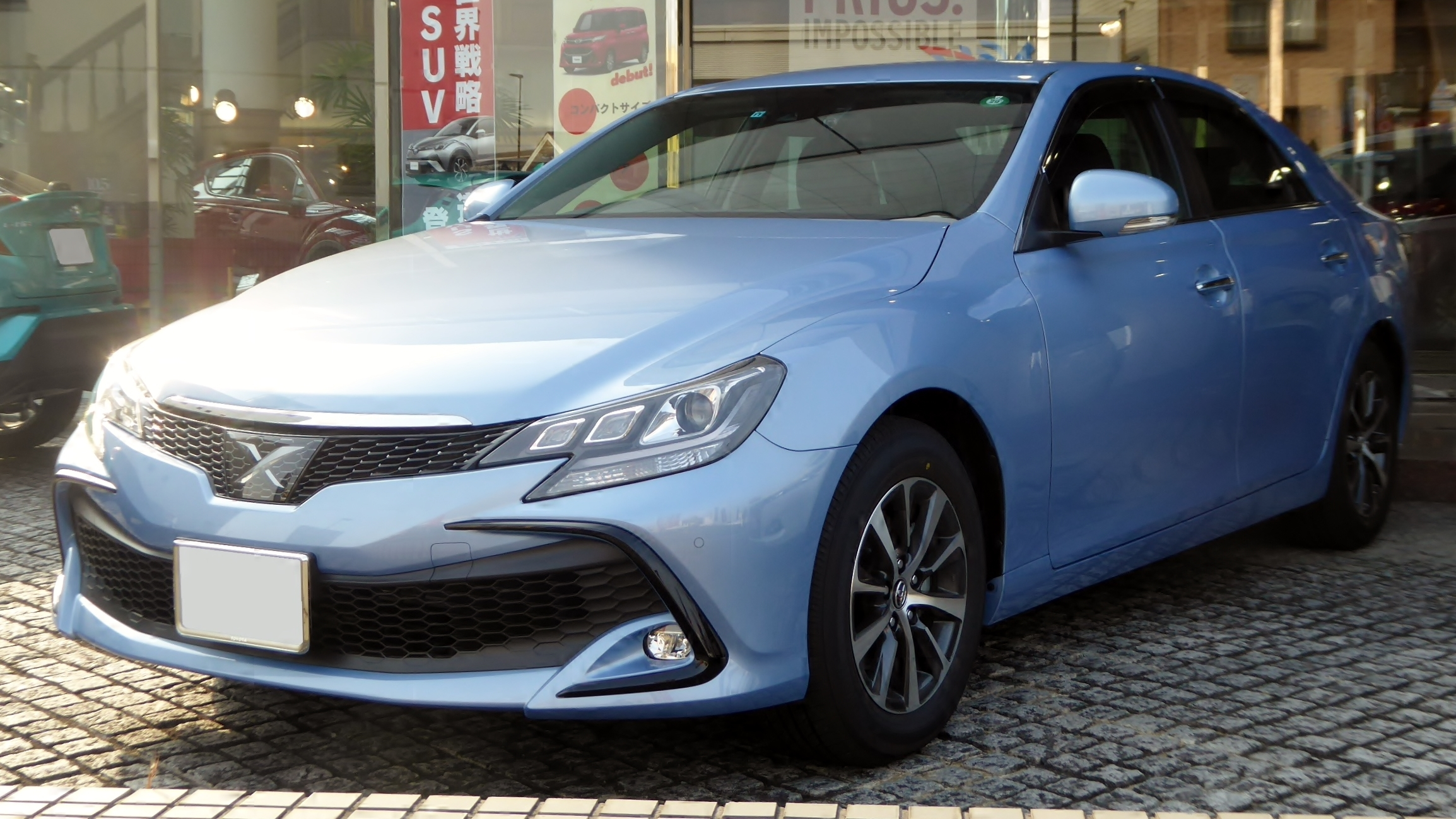
- 2016 Toyota Mark X 250S (GRX130, Japan)

Overview
- Manufacturer: Toyota Motor Corporation
- Also called: Toyota Reiz (China, 2005–2017)
- Production: November 2004 – December 2019

Body and chassis
- Class: Mid-size car
- Body style: 4-door saloon/sedan
- Layout: Front-engine, rear-wheel-drive; Front-engine, four-wheel-drive
- Platform: Toyota N platform

Chronology
- Predecessor: Toyota Mark II; Toyota Verossa

The Toyota Mark X (Japanese: トヨタ・マークX, Hepburn: Toyota Māku X) is a mid-size car manufactured by Toyota between 2004 and 2019, and was primarily aimed at the Japanese market. The Mark X was introduced in 2004 and is the successor to the Mark II which was first introduced in 1968, and was known in the North American market as the Corona Mark II starting in 1972, and renamed the Cressida from 1977 to 1992.

The "Mark X" is not pronounced "Mark Ten" but "Mark Ex", though the "Mark II" is "Mark Two". The Mark X is a continuation of the previous Mark II and its siblings, the sport-orientated Chaser, and the luxurious Cresta in one vehicle, repeating an approach previously attempted by the short-lived Verossa that used inline-six engines, whereas the Mark X uses V6 engines.

The Mark X was previously sold as an alternative to the front-wheel drive Camry, which was once the largest new saloon at Corolla Store locations, for buyers who like the size of the Camry, but prefer a rear-wheel drive layout.

Different engine sizes were offered to allow Japanese buyers to choose which annual road tax they were willing to pay; the larger engines offer higher levels of standard equipment and luxury features. Both the first and second generation Mark X were manufactured at the Motomachi plant in Japan.

The Mark X was sold as the Reiz (Chinese: 锐志; pinyin: Ruìzhì) in China, which was produced by Tianjin FAW Toyota Motor Co. Ltd. It was produced until 2017. The Mark X was also officially imported to Indonesia in limited quantities between 2012 and 2013 to replace Australian-built Camrys as premium taxis. However, the plan was scrapped and the already imported units were instead sold to the general public.

== First generation (X120; 2004) ==
First generation (X120)
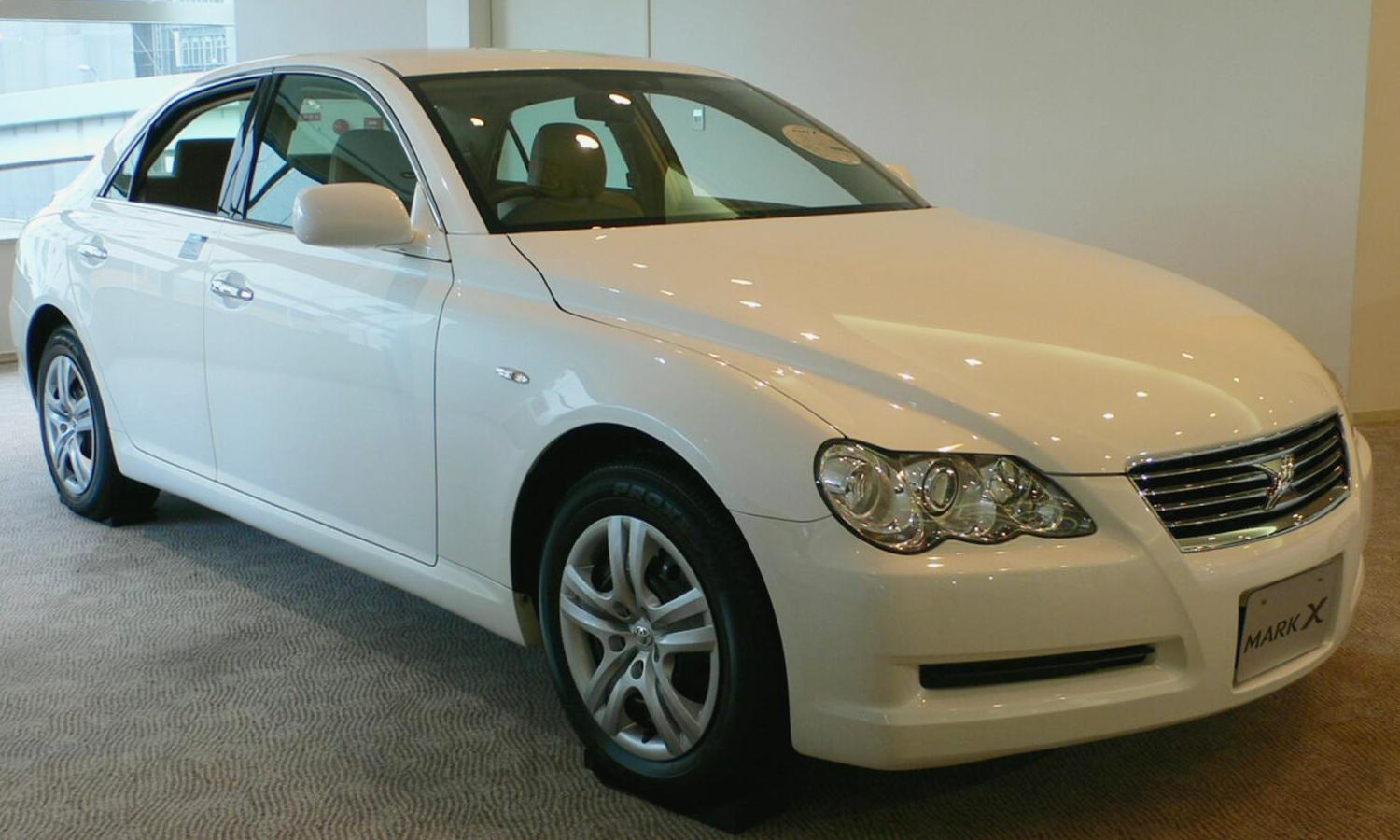
- 2004 Mark X (Japan)

Overview
- Model code: X120
- Production: November 2004 – October 2009 (Japan); October 2005 – 2010 (China)
- Assembly: Japan: Toyota, Aichi (Motomachi plant); Iwate (Kanto Auto Works, November 2004 – September 2006); China: Tianjin (TFTM)

Powertrain
- Engine: Petrol: 2.5 L 4GR-FSE V6 (GRX120/125); 2.5 L 5GR-FE V6 (GRX122; China); 3.0 L 3GR-FE V6 (GRX121; China); 3.0 L 3GR-FSE V6 (GRX121)
- Transmission: 5-speed automatic (4WD); 6-speed automatic (RWD)

Dimensions
- Wheelbase: 2,850 mm (112.2 in)
- Length: 4,730 mm (186.2 in)
- Width: 1,775 mm (69.9 in)
- Height: 1,435–1,445 mm (56.5–56.9 in)
- Kerb weight: 1,510–1,570 kg (3,329–3,461 lb)

Toyota unveiled the Mark X saloon in 2004 as the successor to the Mark II saloon which has been on the market since 1968. Instead of being based on a modified Supra chassis "A" series platform, the Mark X shares its platform with the Toyota "S" series platform used under the Crown and Lexus GS.

The continuation of describing this vehicle as the "X" series is a reference to the first dedicated Mark II platform introduced in 1972. Major changes to the Mark series are the engine and footwork. Toyota discontinued the inline-six engines used in the Verossa which included the JZ series and the G series engines, and went to the newly developed GR series engine. Either the 158 kW (215 PS; 212 hp) 2.5 L (2,497 cc) 4GR-FSE or the 188 kW (256 PS; 252 hp) 3.0 L (2,995 cc) 3GR-FSE engine options were available. It was only available at Toyopet Store Japanese locations to position it as a top-level luxury car. The previous top-level car was the Toyota Celsior, which now assumed the more internationally known Lexus LS and was exclusive to Japanese Lexus dealerships.

Both engines offer Dual VVT-i with D-4 direct injection. The rear-wheel-drive models have a 6-speed torque converter automatic gearbox as standard, and the iFour four-wheel drive models have a 5-speed automatic. No manual transmission options were offered.

A first in its class is the rear bumper with an integrated exhaust outlet, which later moved to the corresponding model year Lexus LS series and the Crown. An LED lighting system is built into the headliner, running from front to rear, and also extends to the footwells, doors, gear lever, and key area. The lighting patterns and intensity of this system can be used to create different lighting schemes for different situations.

Minor changes were made in 2006. Mirror-mounted indicators replaced the wing-mounted units, headlamps and taillamps were revised, and the grille was redesigned. Mark X, with a black interior colour, deleted the wood trim in favour of the brushed aluminium trim. This change also formalised the introduction of the "S package," which gains the three-spoke steering wheel and changes to the exterior lip piece.

In 2007, for Japanese models only, G-BOOK, a subscription telematics service, was offered as an option.

The former Kanto Auto Works produced the Mark X from November 2004 to September 2006.

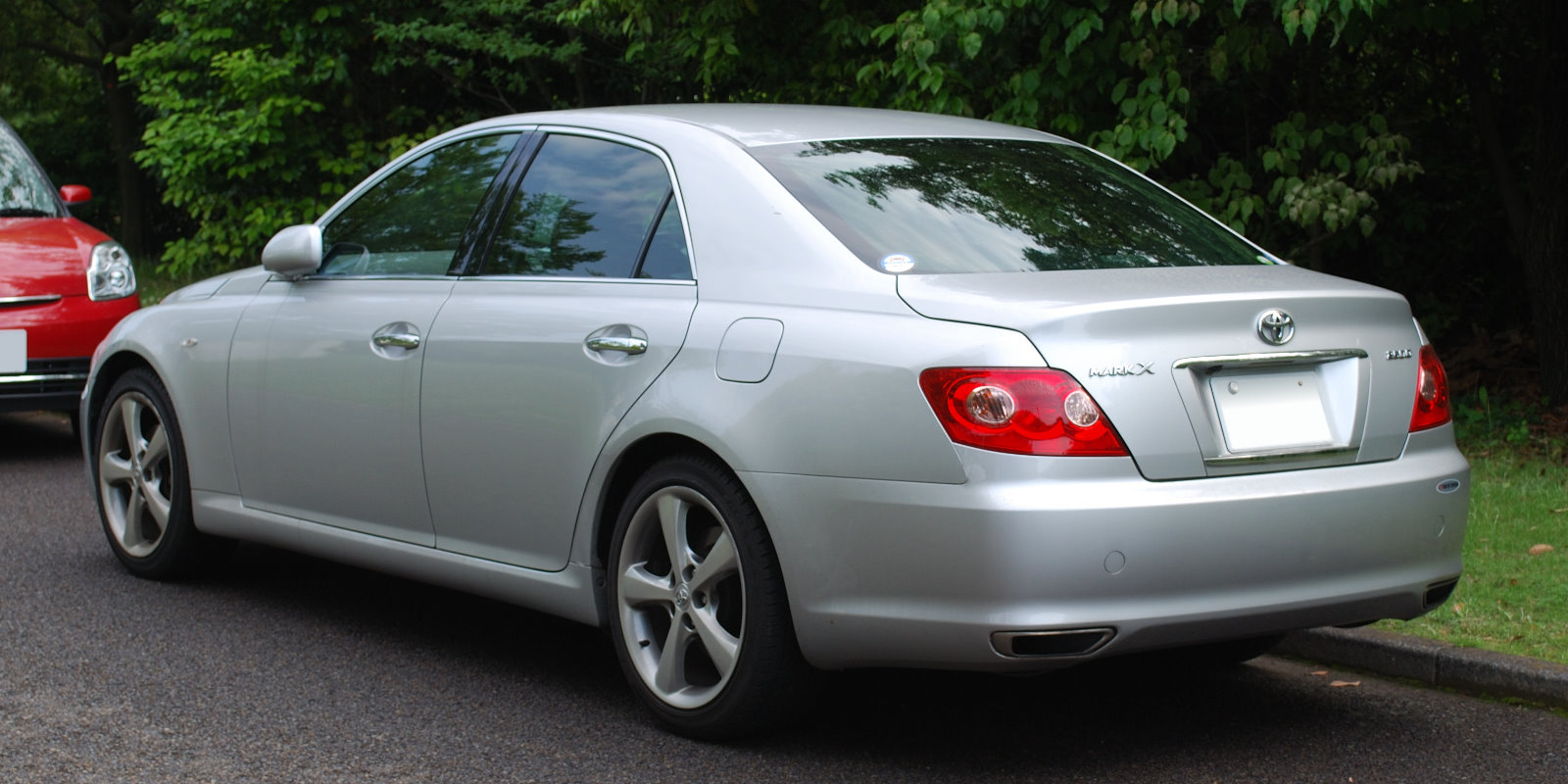
2004 Mark X (Japan)

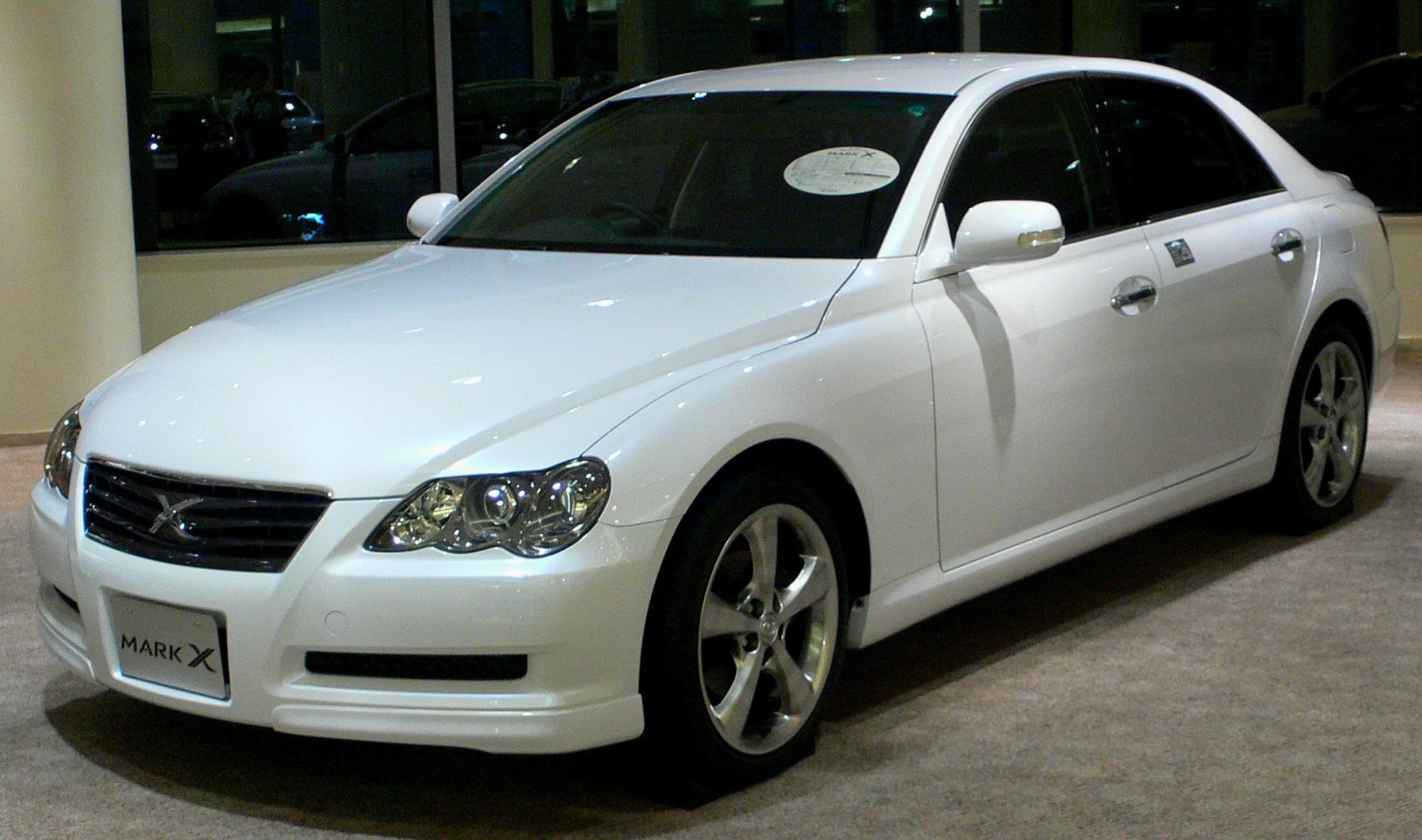
2006 Mark X (Japan)

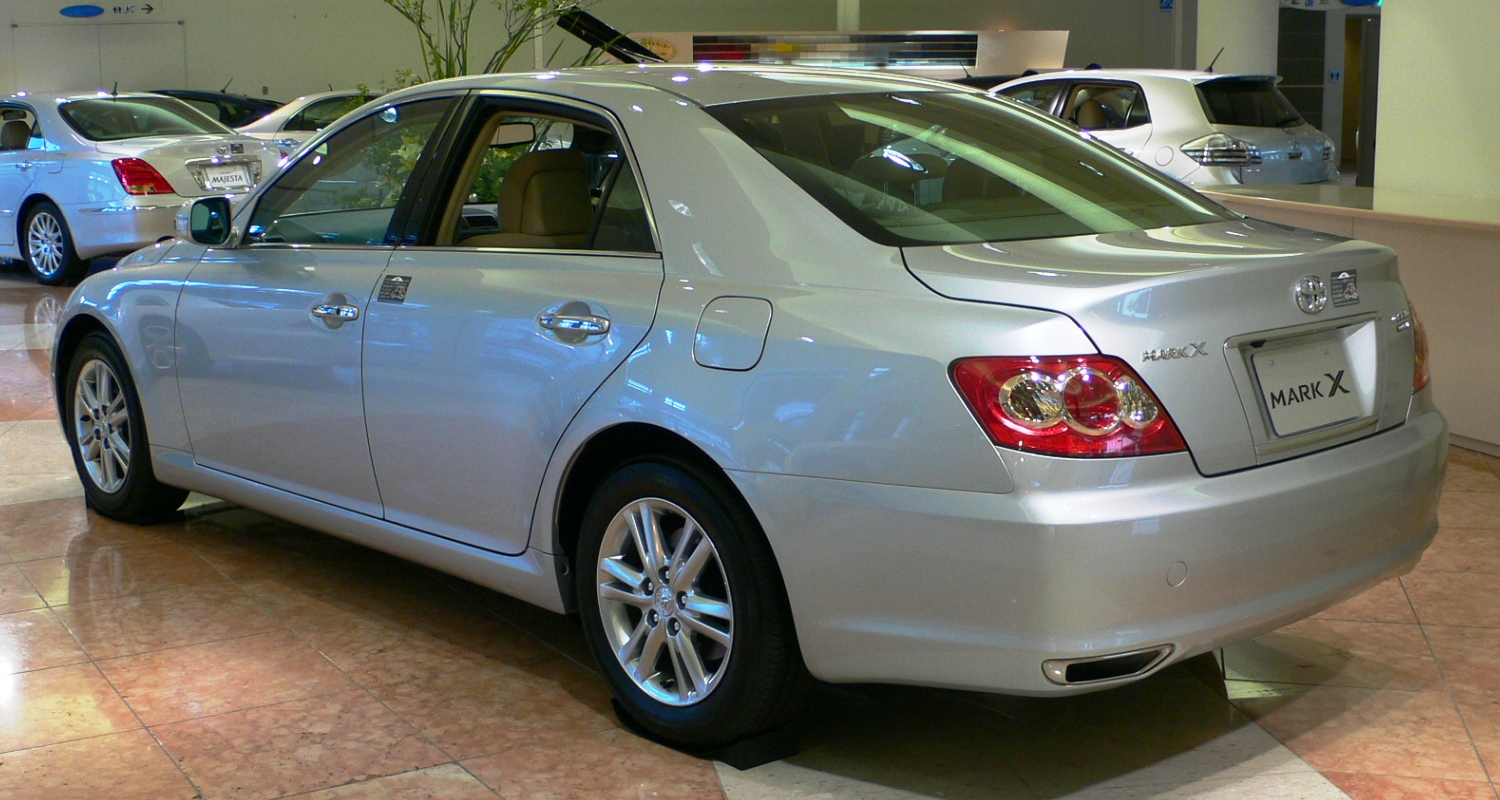
2006 Mark X (Japan)

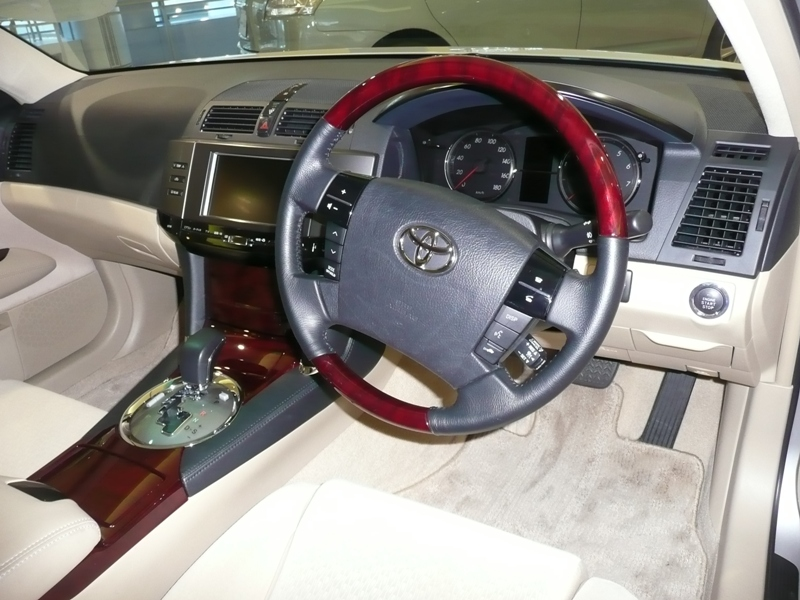
Interior

=== China ===
The Chinese market Reiz is sold in 2.5 S, 2.5 V and 3.0 V Premium trim levels with 2.5 L (2,497 cc) 5GR-FE and 3.0 L (2,995 cc) 3GR-FE engines. It entered production on 24 October 2005 at the Tianjin FAW Toyota Motor Co. Ltd. plant.

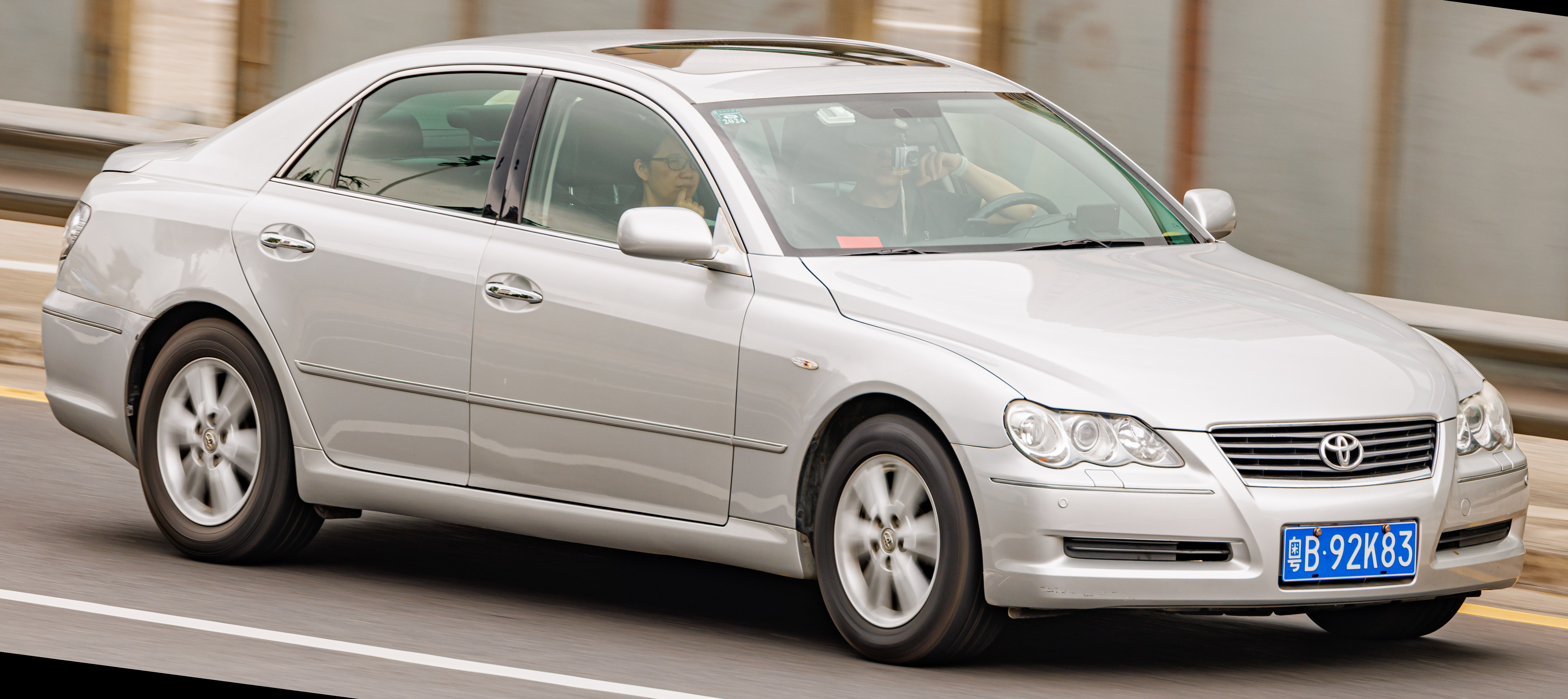
Reiz (pre-facelift, China)

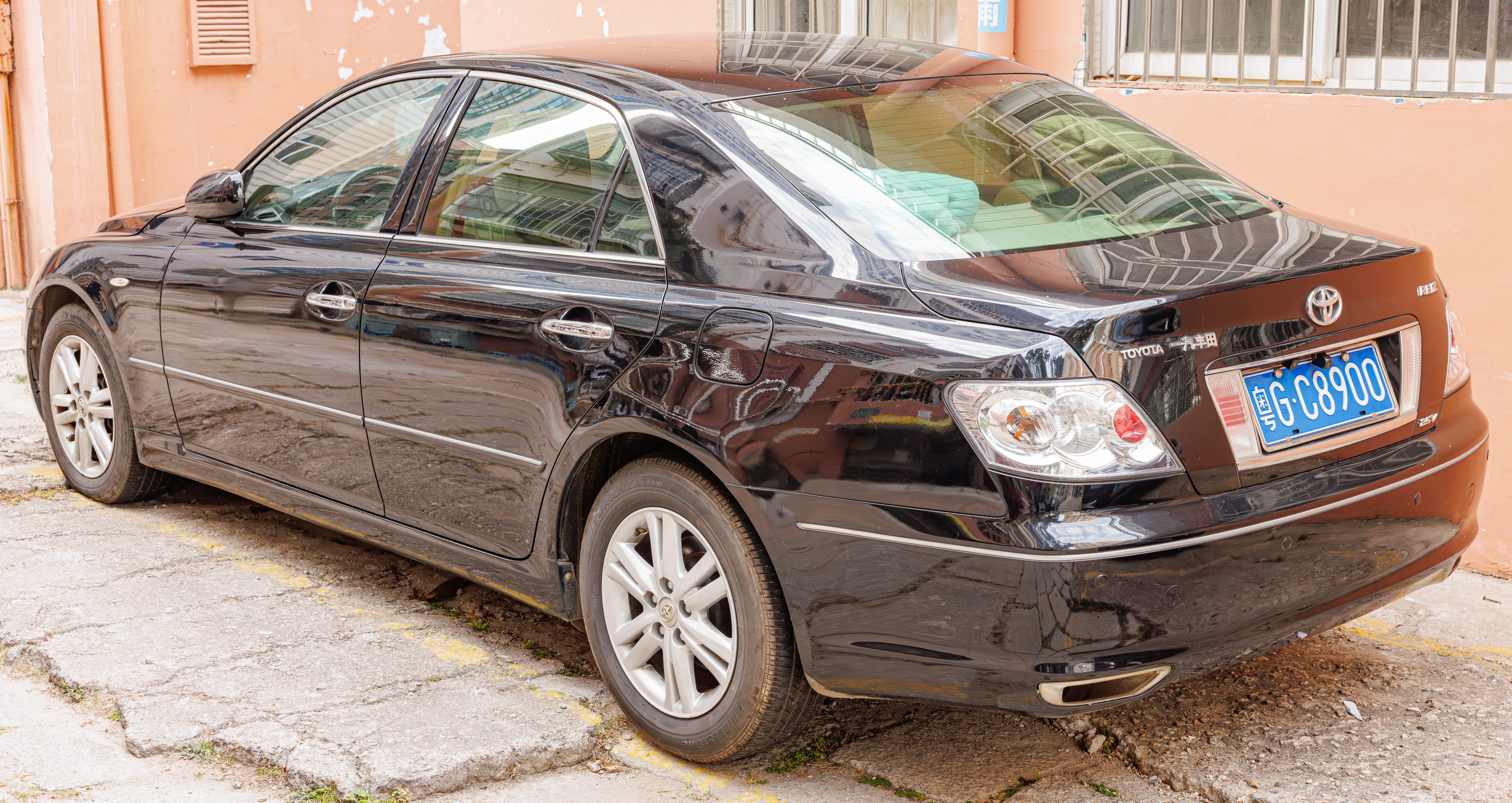
Rear view

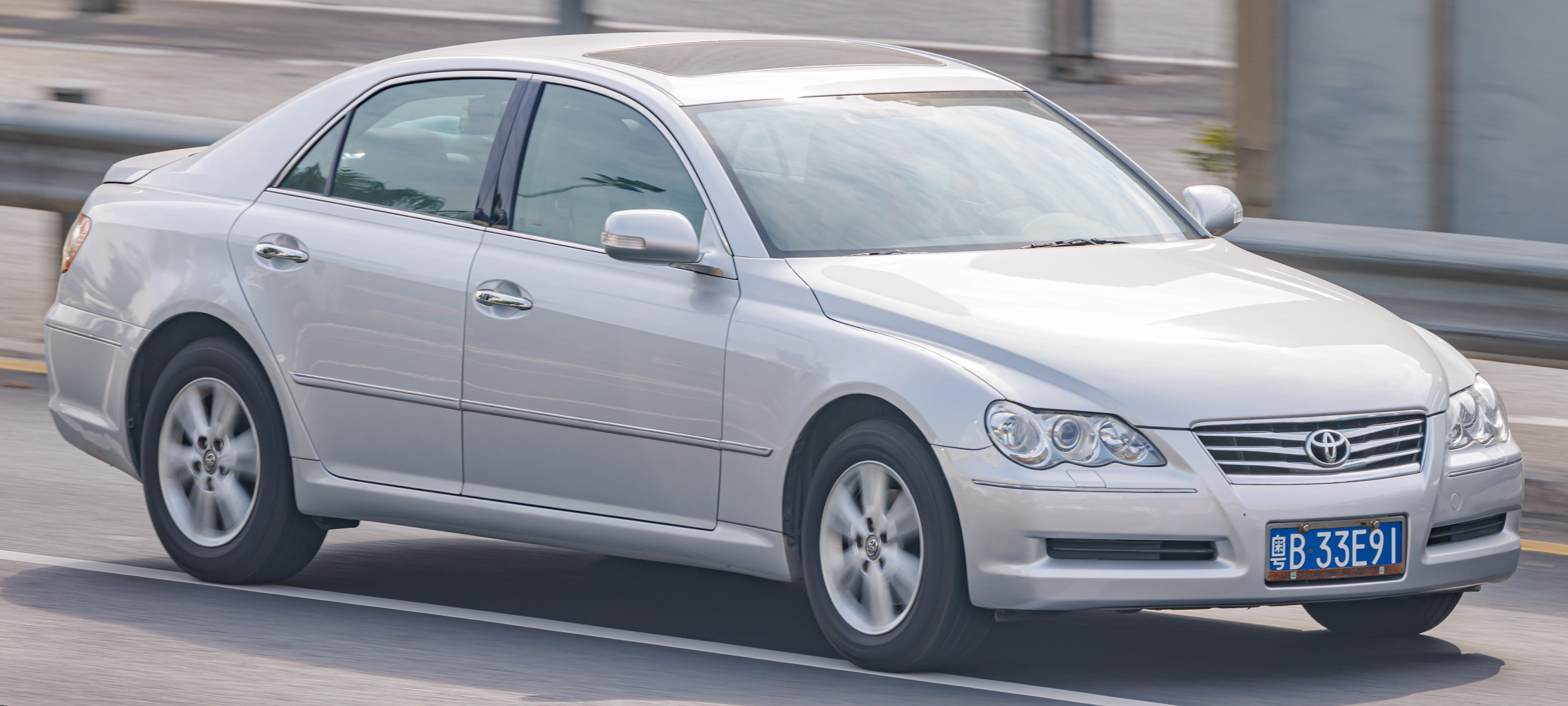
Reiz (facelift, China)

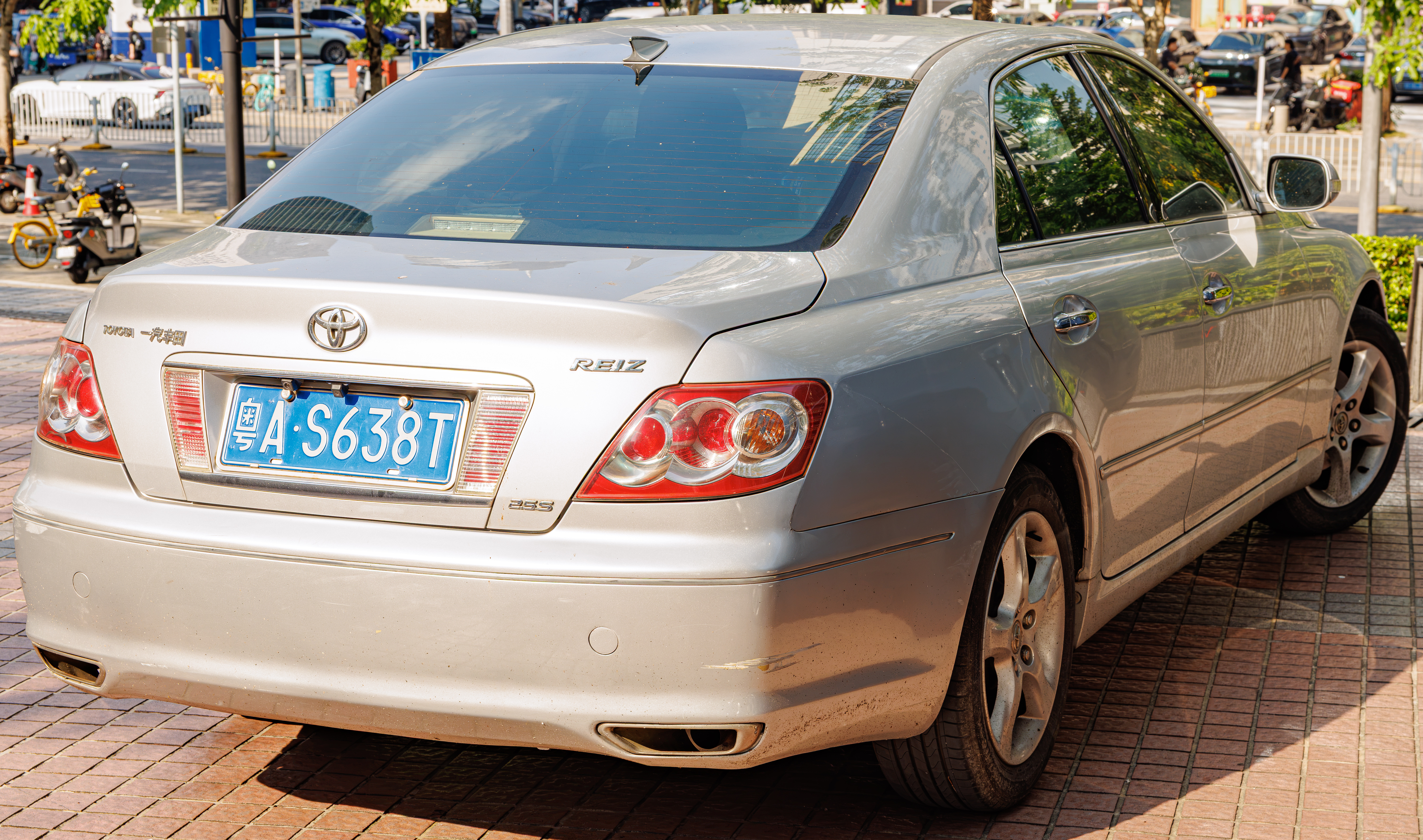
Rear view

=== Special versions ===
==== Mark X Supercharged ====
The Mark X Supercharged version uses the supercharged 3GR-FSE engine paired to 6-speed automatic transmission. The power output is rated at 235 kW (315 hp; 320 PS) at 6,200 rpm and 412 N⋅m (304 lb⋅ft) of torque at 3,200 rpm.

==== 50th Anniversary Limited Edition ====
A limited edition 50th Anniversary Limited Edition Mark X was produced with the Vertiga kit. It has chrome ducts and carbon fibre splitters as standard parts, as well as different suspension tuning.

=== Engines ===
Engines
Model	Engine displacement	Engine Code	Power at rpm	Torque at rpm	Weight	Years Sold
GRX-120	2,499 cc (V6)	4GR-FSE	158 kW (215 PS; 212 hp) at 6400 rpm	260 N⋅m (192 lb⋅ft) at 3800 rpm	1510 kg (3,329 lb)	2004-2008
GRX-125	2,499 cc (V6)	4GR-FSE (4WD)	158 kW (215 PS; 212 hp) at 6400 rpm	260 N⋅m (192 lb⋅ft) at 3800 rpm	1570 kg (3,461 lb)	2004-2008
GRX-122	2,497 cc (V6)	5GR-FE (China Only)	145 kW (197 PS; 194 hp) at 6200 rpm	243 N⋅m (179 lb⋅ft) at 4400 rpm	1510 kg (3,329 lb)	2005-2010
GRX-121	2,994 cc (V6)	3GR-FE (China Only)	170 kW (231 PS; 228 hp) at 6400 rpm	300 N⋅m (221 lb⋅ft) at 4800 rpm	1520 kg (3,351 lb)	2005-2010
GRX-121	2,994 cc (V6)	3GR-FSE	188 kW (256 PS; 252 hp) at 6200 rpm	314 N⋅m (232 lb⋅ft) at 3600 rpm	1520 kg (3,351 lb)	2004, 2006-2008
GRX-121	2,994 cc (V6)	3GR-FSE (Supercharged)	235 kW (320 PS; 316 hp) at 6200 rpm	412 N⋅m (304 lb⋅ft) at 3200 rpm	1530 kg (3,373 lb)	2004, 2006-2008

== Second generation (X130; 2009) ==
Second generation (X130)
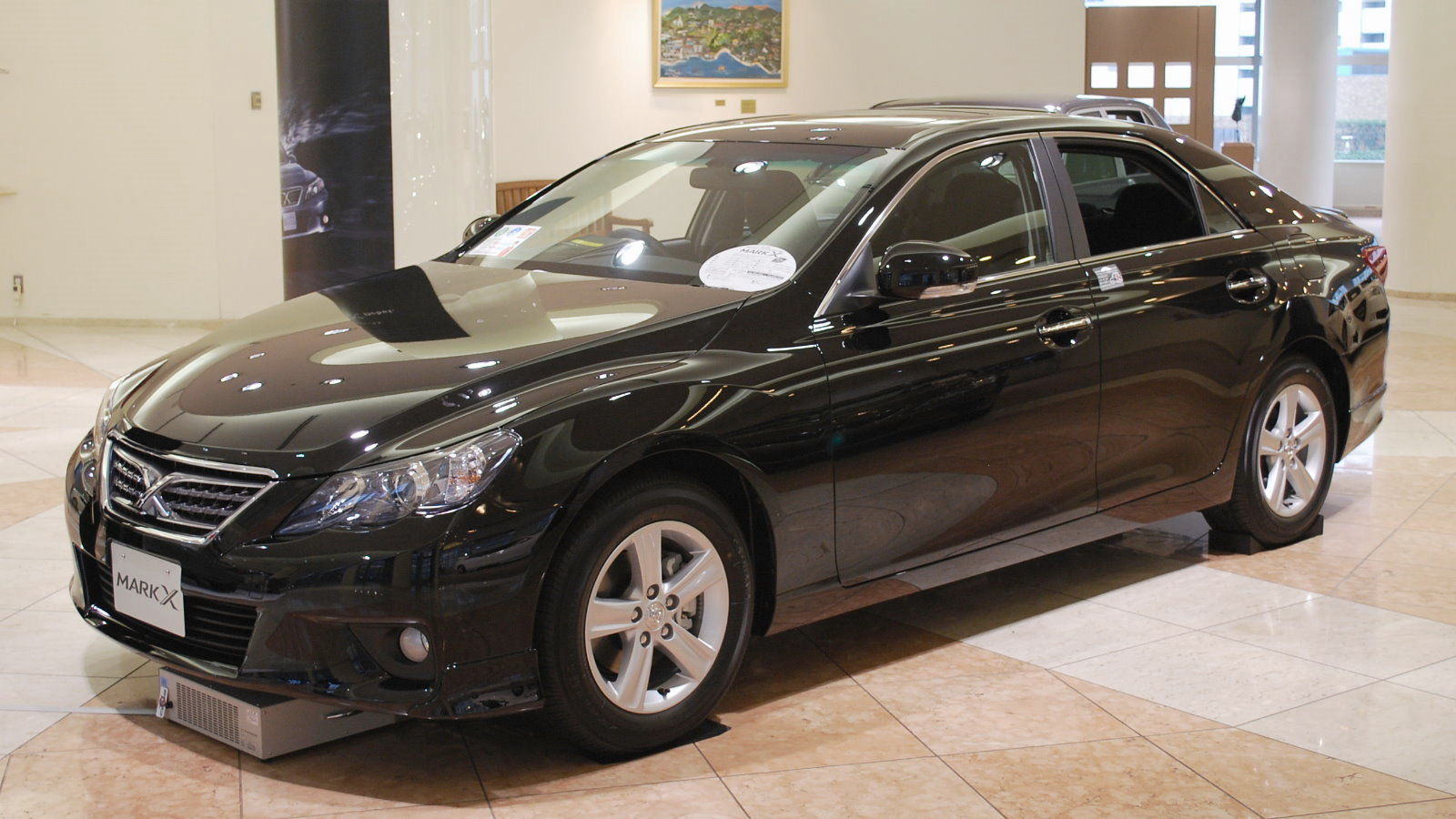
- 2009 Mark X 250G "S Package" (GRX130; pre-facelift, Japan)

Overview
- Model code: X130
- Production: October 2009 – December 2019 (Japan); September 2010 – September 2017 (China)
- Assembly: Japan: Toyota, Aichi (Motomachi plant); China: Tianjin (TFTM)

Powertrain
- Engine: Petrol: 2.5 L 4GR-FSE V6 (GRX130/135); 2.5 L 5GR-FE V6 (GRX132; China); 3.0 L 3GR-FE V6 (GRX131); 3.5 L 2GR-FSE V6 (GRX133)
- Power output: 149 kW (200 hp; 203 PS) (4GR-FSE); 234–236 kW (314–316 hp; 318–321 PS) (2GR-FSE); 265 kW (355 hp; 360 PS) (2GR-FSE, +M Super Charger model)
- Transmission: 6-speed A760E or A760H automatic; 6-speed RA60 manual (GRMN)

Dimensions
- Wheelbase: 2,850 mm (112.2 in)
- Length: 4,770 mm (187.8 in)
- Width: 1,795 mm (70.7 in)
- Height: 1,435–1,445 mm (56.5–56.9 in); 1,420 mm (55.9 in) (GRMN)
- Kerb weight: 1,510–1,570 kg (3,329–3,461 lb)

The second generation Mark X was released on 19 October 2009, followed by the Reiz in September 2010. Engine options are the 149 kW (200 hp; 203 PS) 2.5 L (2,497 cc) 4GR-FSE V6 and the 234 kW (314 hp; 318 PS) 3.5 L (3,456 cc) 2GR-FSE V6. Models available are Standard, Premium and Sports. Changes from the previous generation include the elimination of the exhaust outlet diffuser, 6-speed automatic transmission for All-Trac 4WD models and return to the hinge design boot instead of lift support.

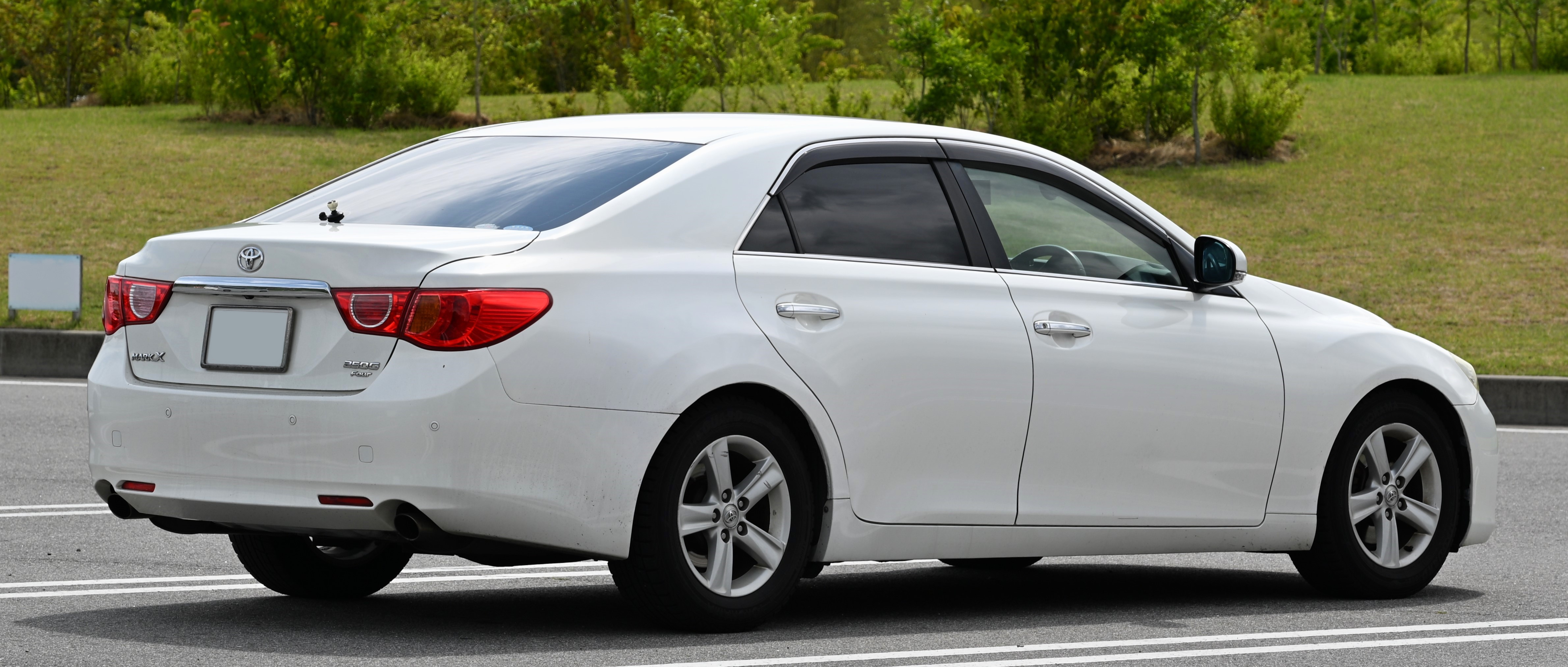
Mark X 250G Four (GRX135)

The Mark X received two facelifts in 2012 and 2016. The 2016 facelift received additional spot welding to strengthen the body. The vehicles also gained "Toyota Safety Sense" consisting of autonomous emergency braking, lane departure alert, automatic high beams and radar cruise control as standard.

=== Models ===
==== Standard ====
The Standard model is the entry-level variant. Available only with the 2.5 L engine, it is available in rear-wheel drive (250G, 250G "F package" and Relax Selection) and four-wheel drive (250G Four, 250G "F package") option. It has an ivory and black interior colour and the option of wood-grain panel colour. The base model "F Package" does not have switches on the steering wheel or door courtesy lamps. 16-inch steel wheels with wheel covers are also standard on this most affordable model. The 250G and Relax Selection came with standard 16-inch alloy wheels, as well as smart entry and push button engine start system.

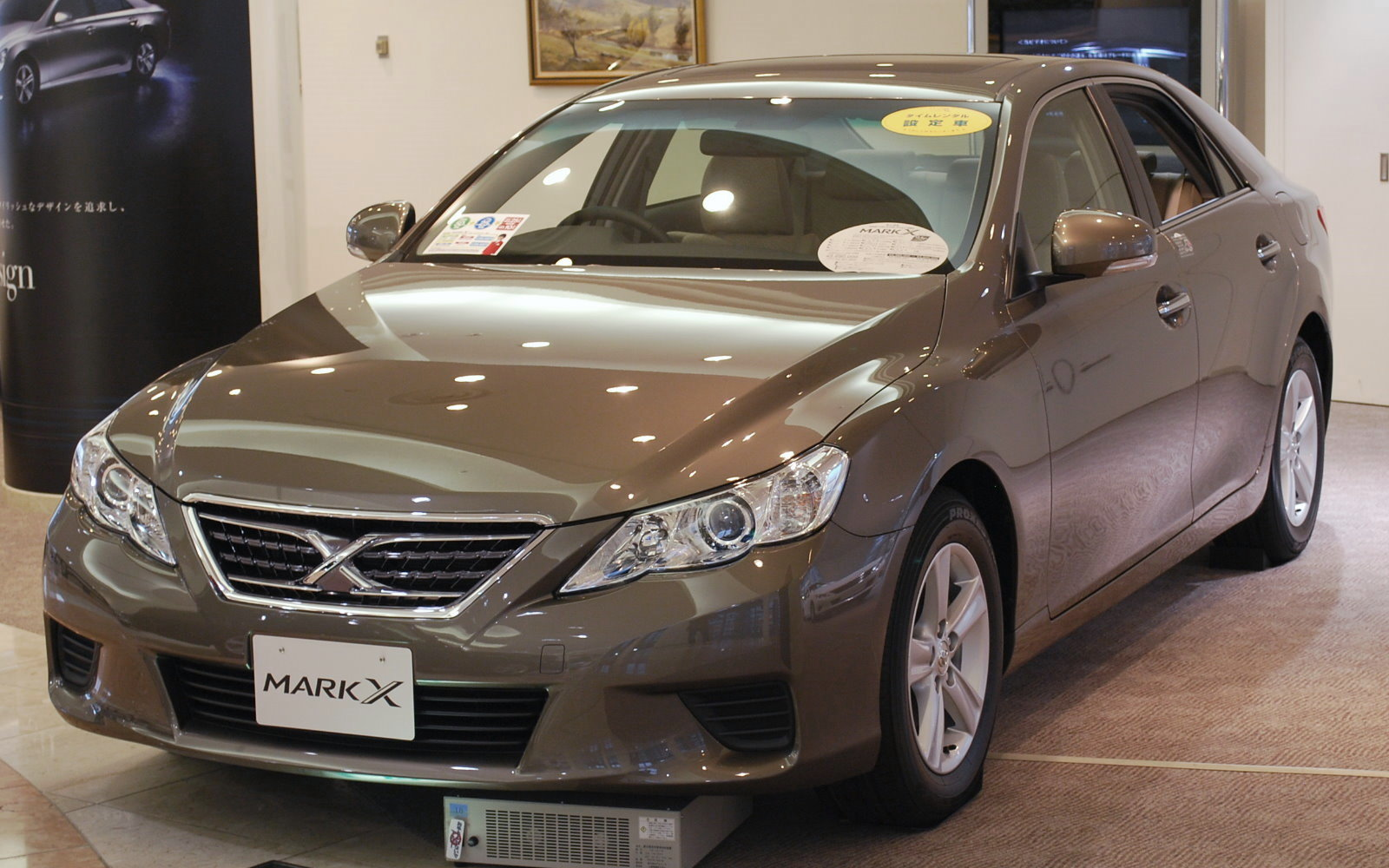
2009 Mark X 250G (GRX130; pre-facelift, Japan)

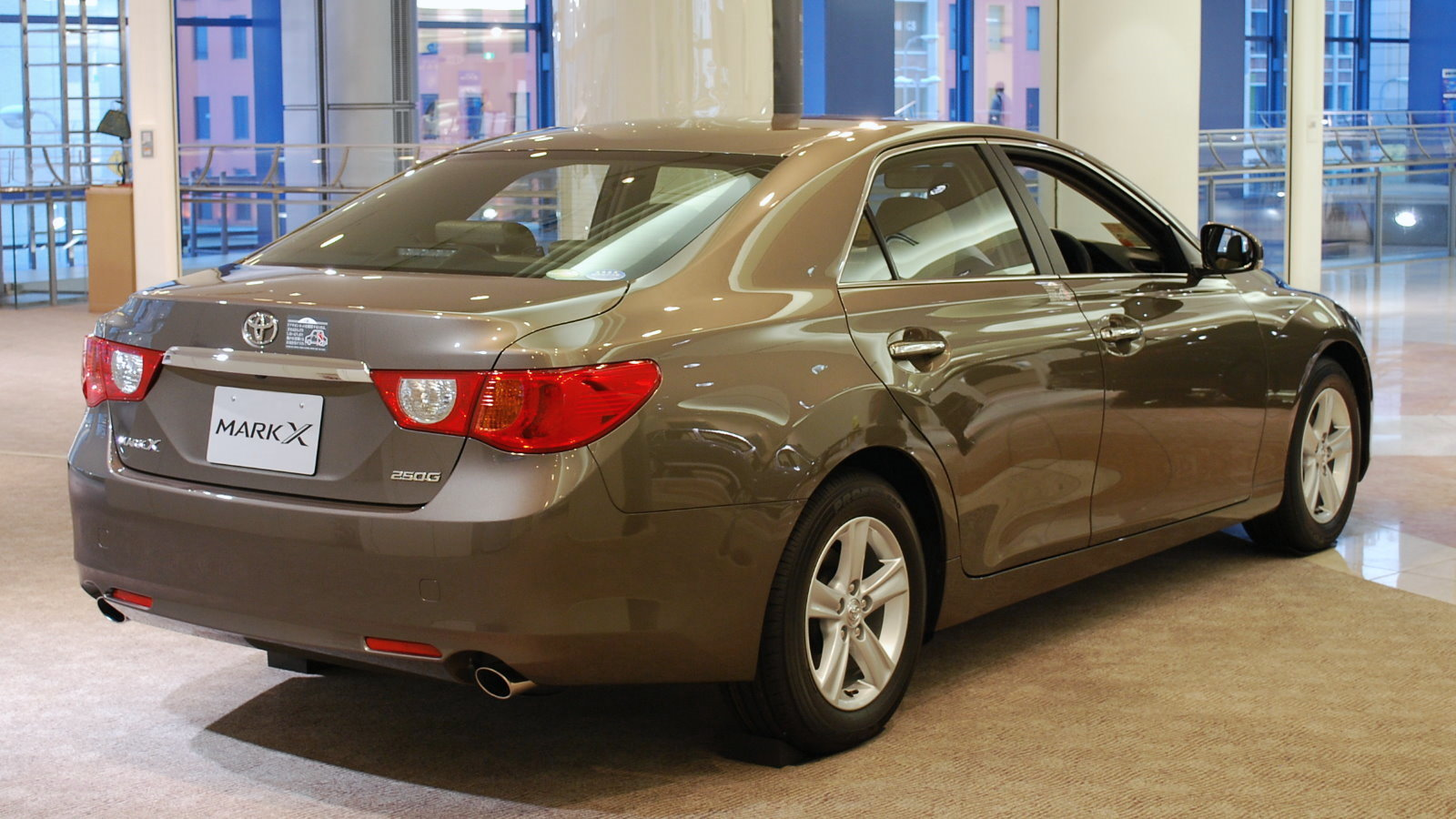
2009 Mark X 250G (GRX130; pre-facelift, Japan)

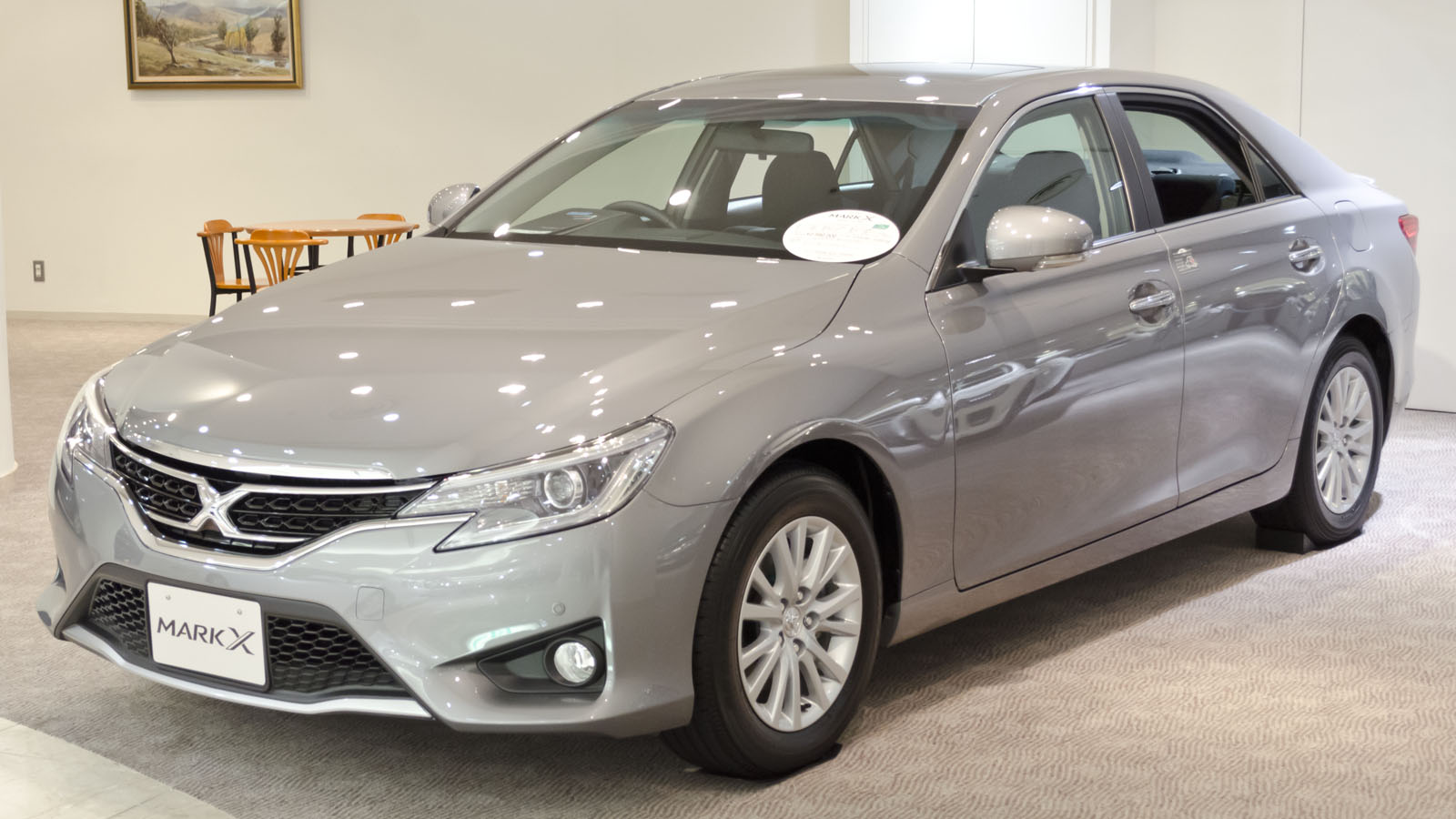
2012 Mark X 250G "S Package" (GRX130; first facelift, Japan)

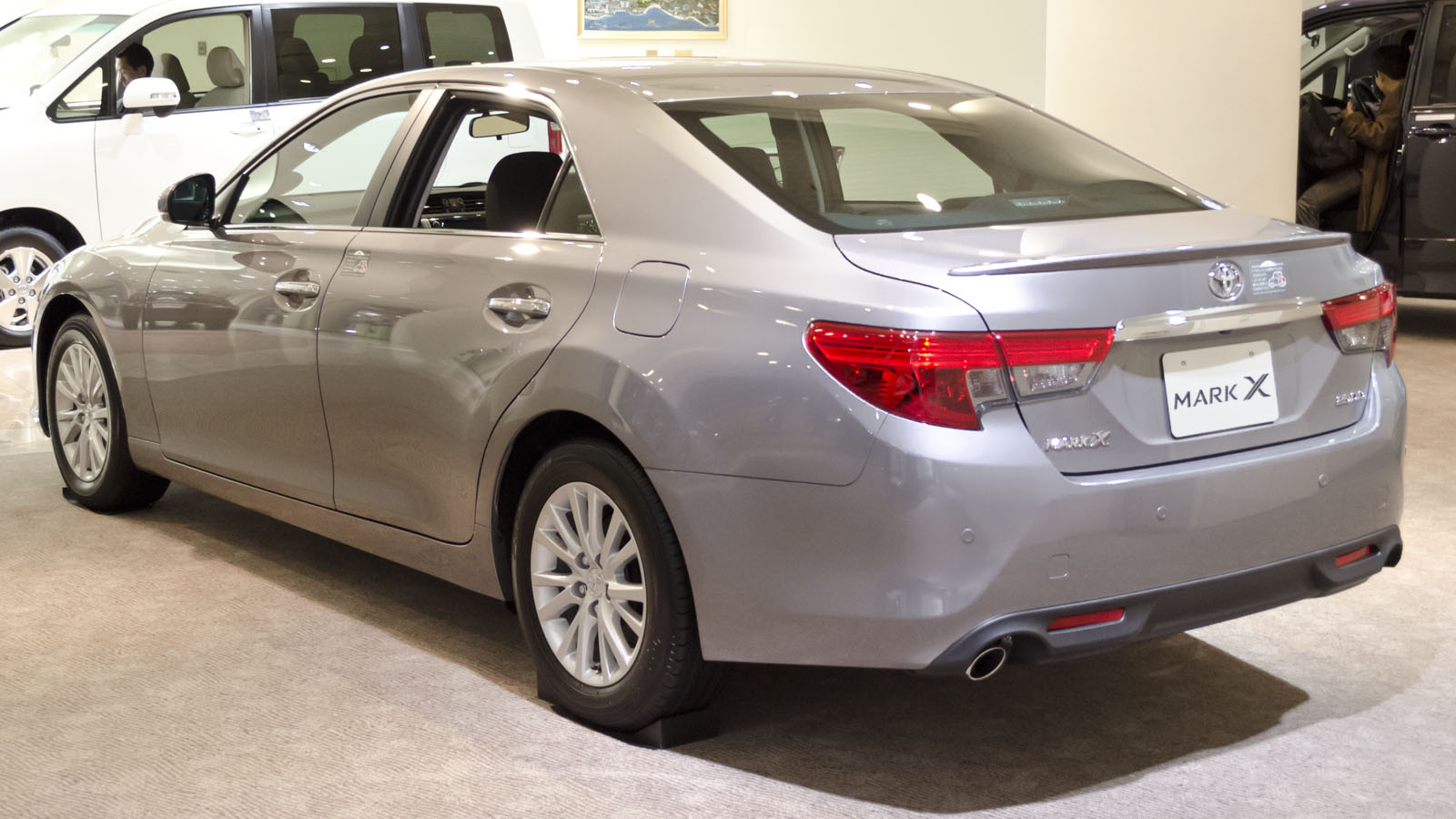
2012 Mark X 250G "S Package" (GRX130; first facelift, Japan)

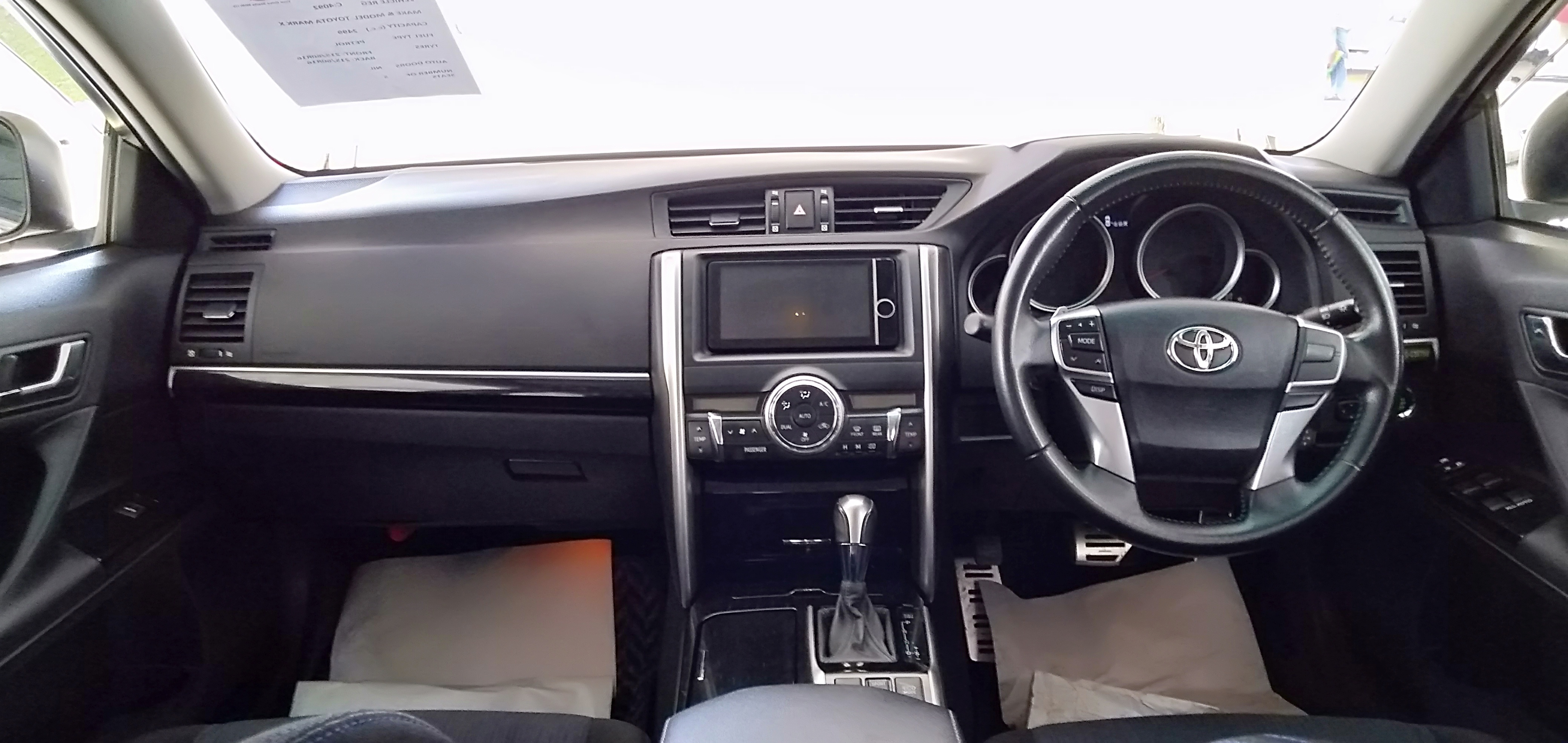
First facelift interior

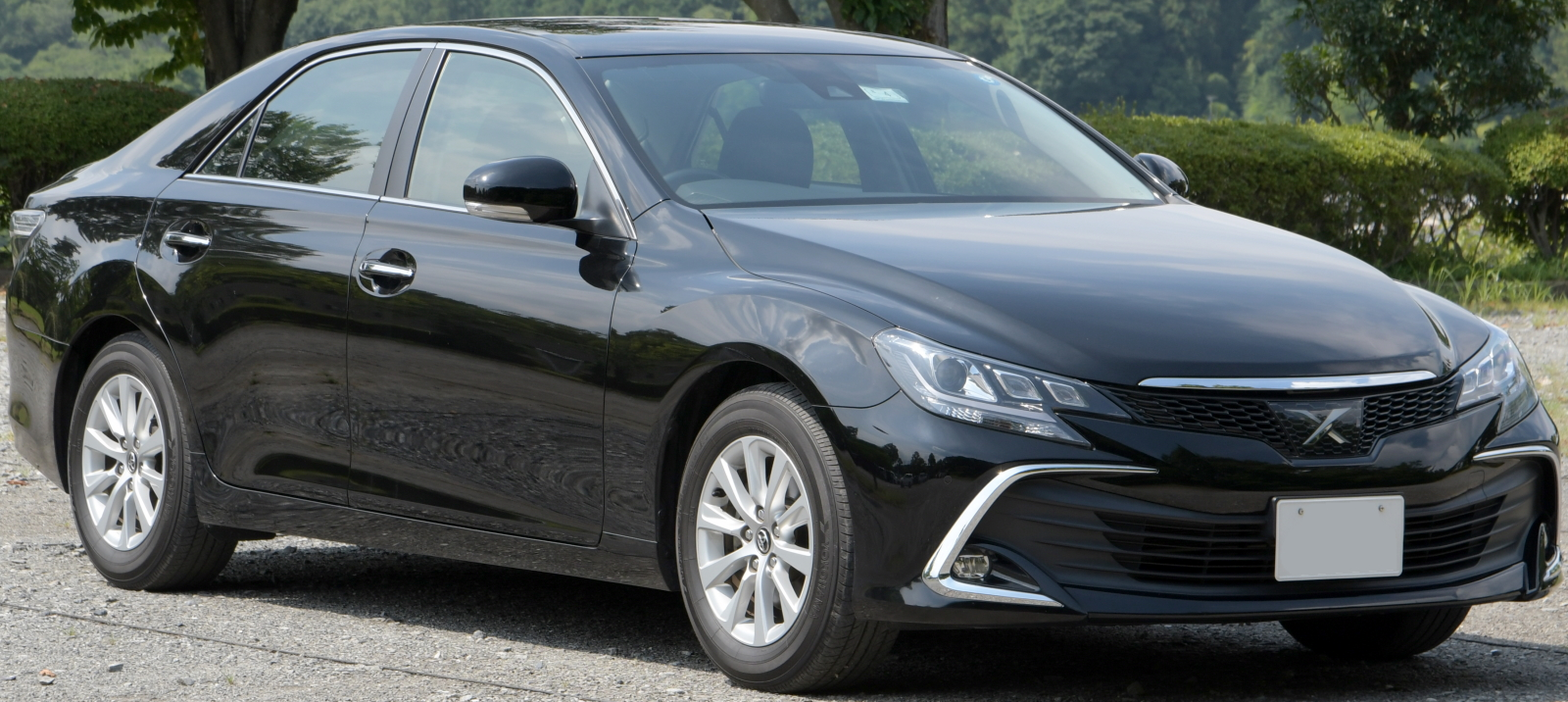
2016 Mark X 250G (GRX130; second facelift, Japan)

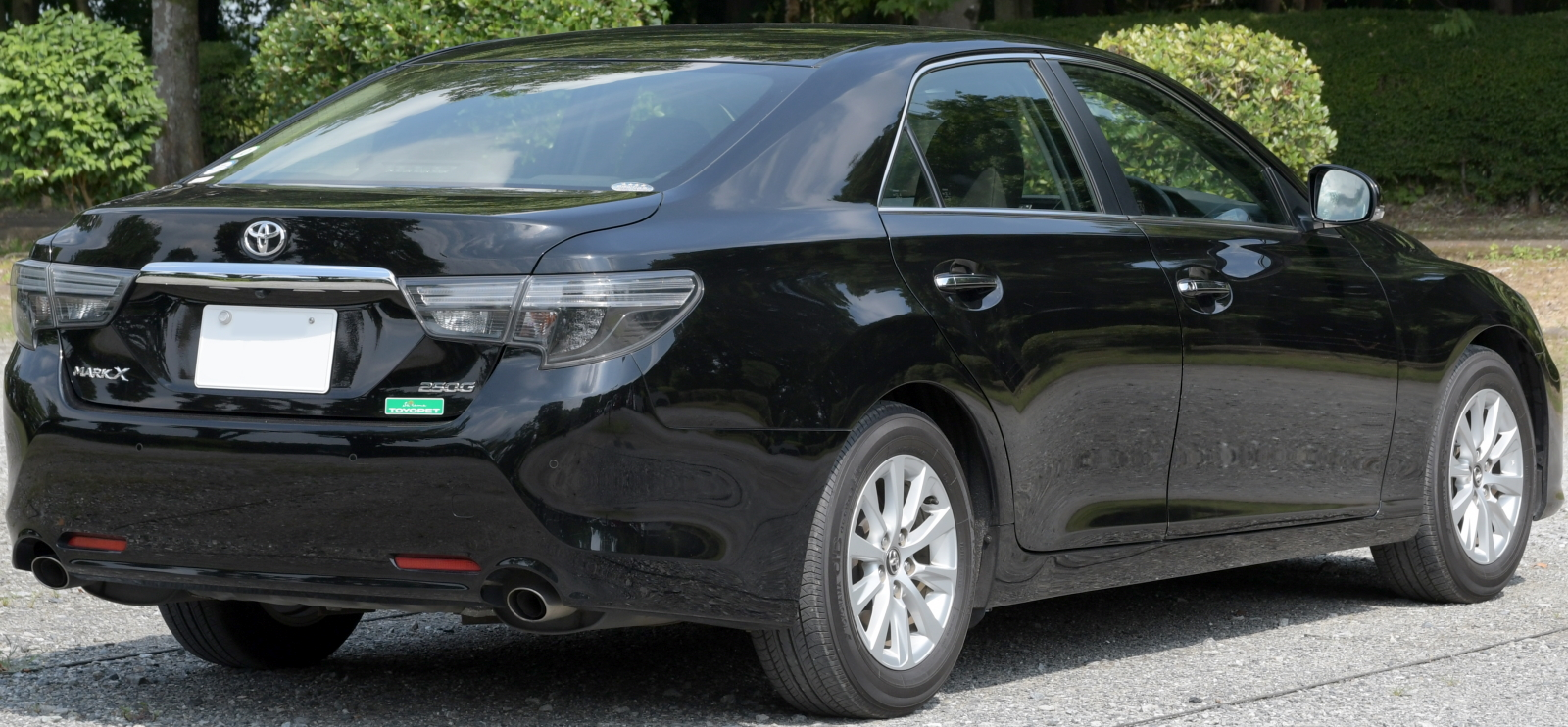
2016 Mark X 250G (GRX130; second facelift, Japan)

==== Premium ====
This variant was initially available only with the 3.5 L engine as the Premium and Premium "L Package". The exterior differentiates itself from other grades by arranging the mall plated grille, trim specific side skirts and unique front bumper design. It also features a millimetre-wave radar system for cruise control and a pre-crash safety system with brake activation. The seat upholstery is made from Alcantara (with leather being an option). Super UV cut glass and nanoE air ventilation system is also used on this grade. Other features include a retractable rear sunshade, fully automatic self-parking system, driver's power 8-way adjustable seat and passenger 4-way power seat (with inbuilt heating and cooling) and electronically adjustable shock absorbers (Adaptive Variable Suspension System (AVS) which can be controlled from the cabin. For the facelift model, the Premium is also offered with the 2.5 L engine.

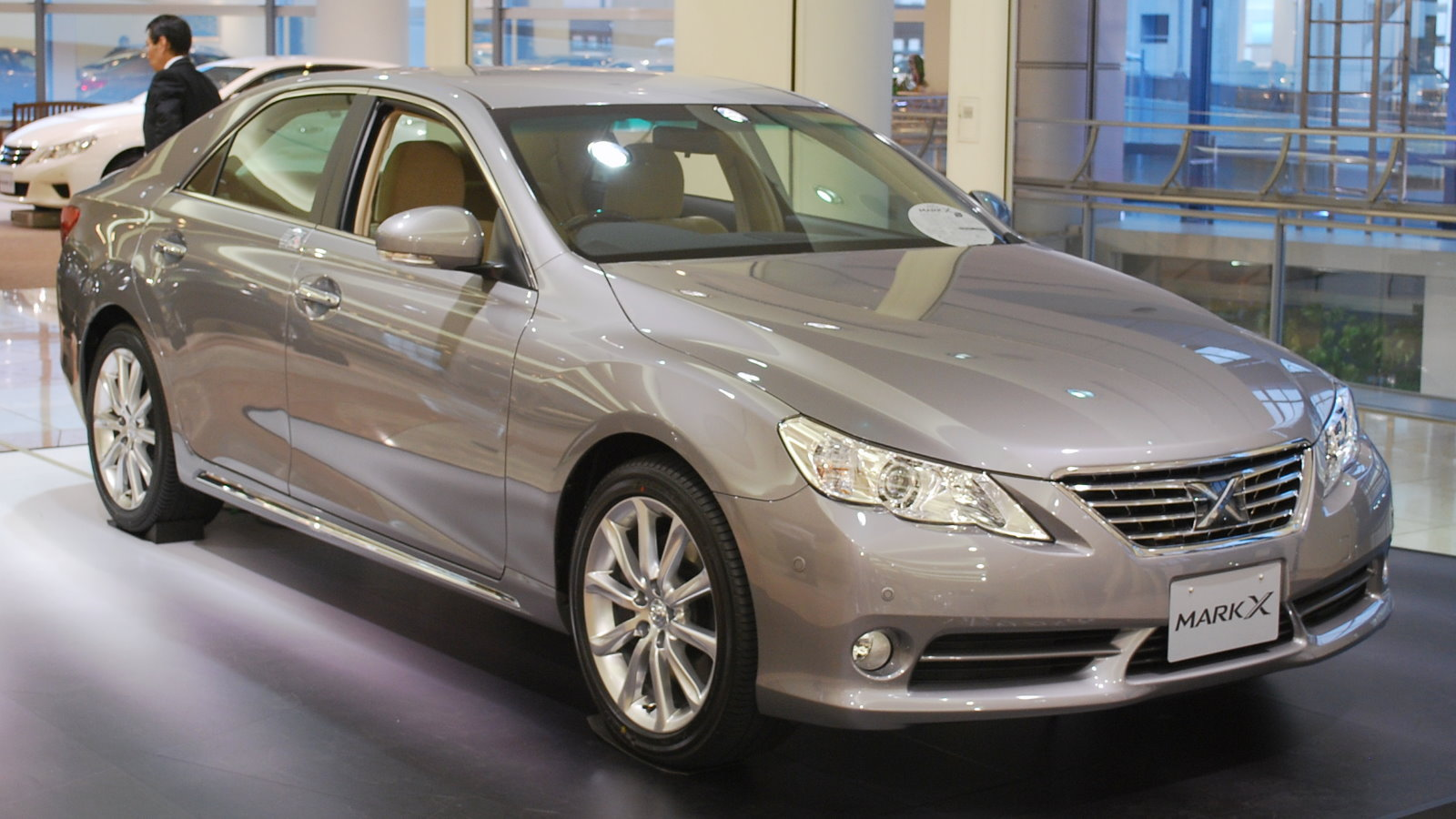
2009 Mark X Premium (GRX133; pre-facelift, Japan)

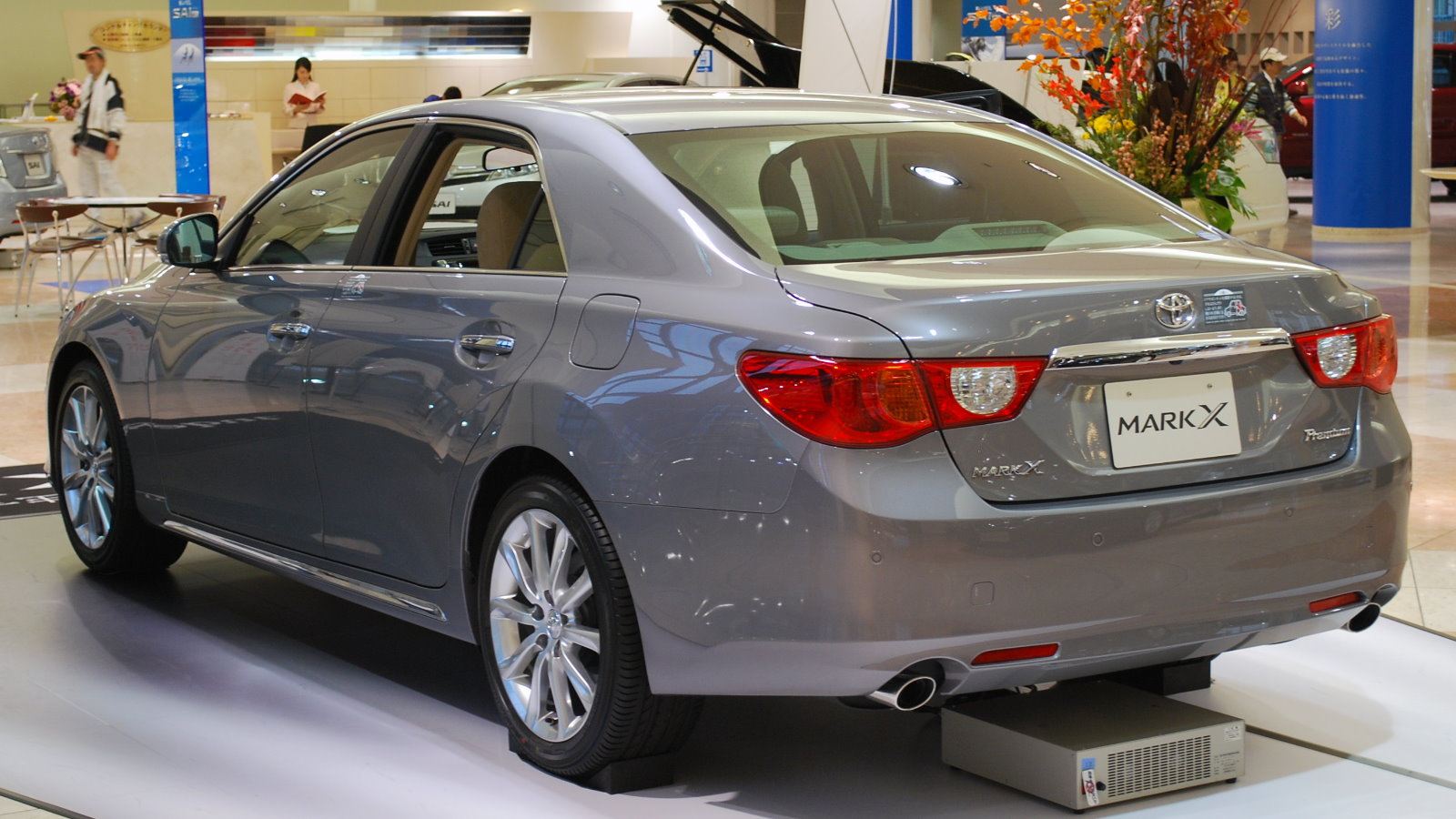
2009 Mark X Premium (GRX133; pre-facelift, Japan)

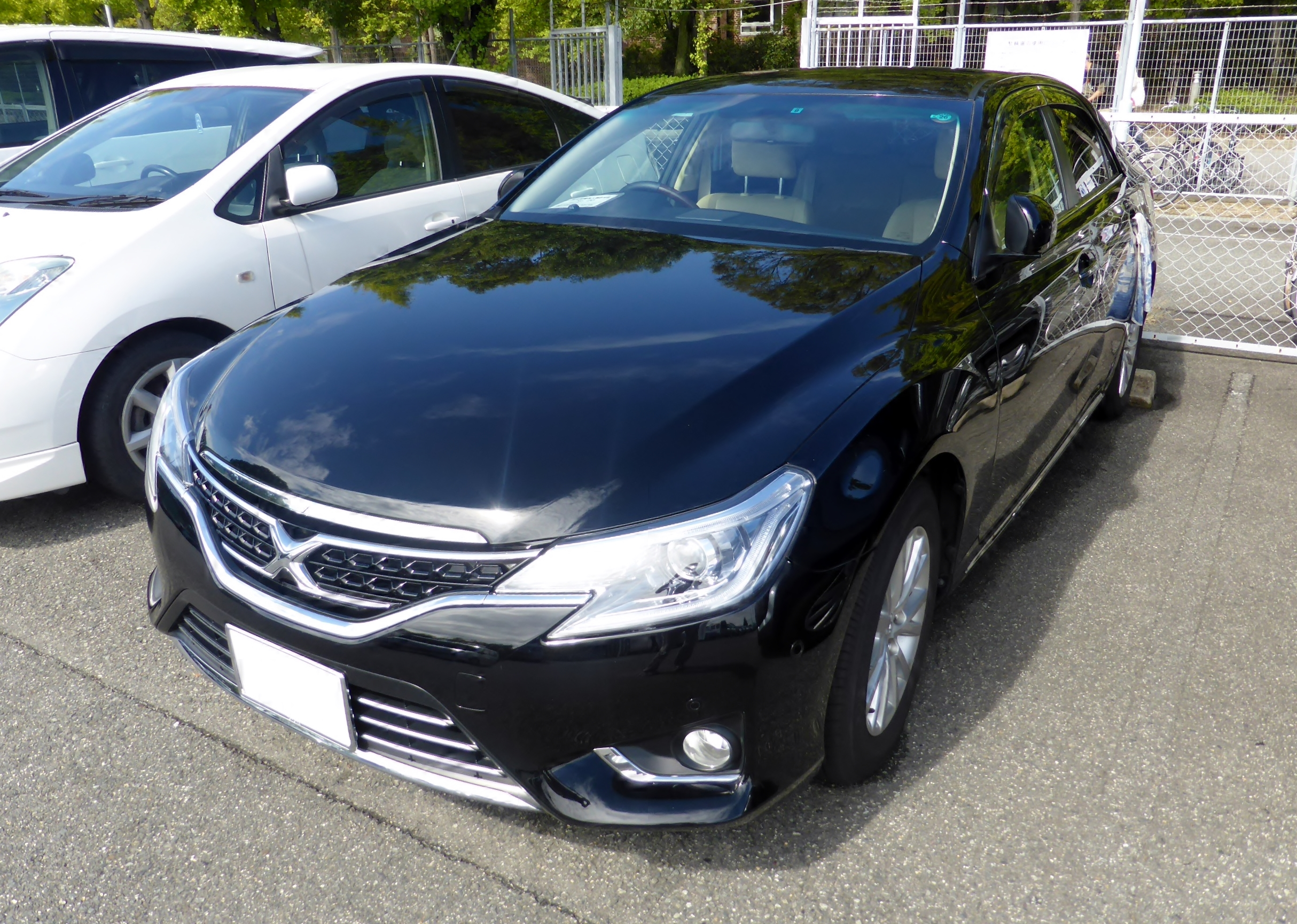
2013 Mark X Premium (GRX130; first facelift, Japan)

==== Sports ====
The Sports variant is available as the 250S/250RDS and the 350S/350RDS. It is designed to replace the Tourer V variant from previous models of the X-chassis cars. Standard on the exterior is a rear boot spoiler, rear diffuser and redesigned front and rear bumpers dedicated to improving aerodynamic performance. In addition, it has a smoked coating on the headlamps and taillamps to differentiate itself from the other models. Specific to the 350S is special 18x8J aluminium wheels with 235/45R18 tyres, 334 mm (13.1 in) large-diameter ventilated front brake disks and four-piston "aluminium monobloc callipers" made by ADVICS Co. Unique to the Sports variant is Vehicle Dynamics Integrated Management with variable gear ratio steering which changes the ratio of steering input to wheel movement so as to help low-speed parking as well as remain stable at high speed. Also standard on the 350S is the AVS. This is backed up with other safety features such as VSC, traction control, ABS and EBD. Other standard features include aluminium pedals, footrest and steering wheel paddle shifters. Auto tilt-away steering wheel (when the ignition is switched off) is standard on the 3.5 L models only. Driver's power 8-way adjustable seat and passenger 4-way power seat, seat heating and cooling, and leather interior are available as options.

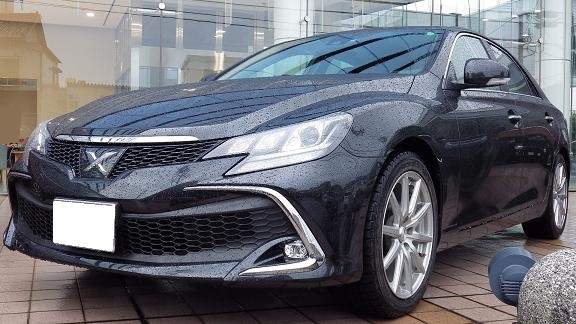
2016 Mark X 250RDS (GRX130; second facelift, Japan)

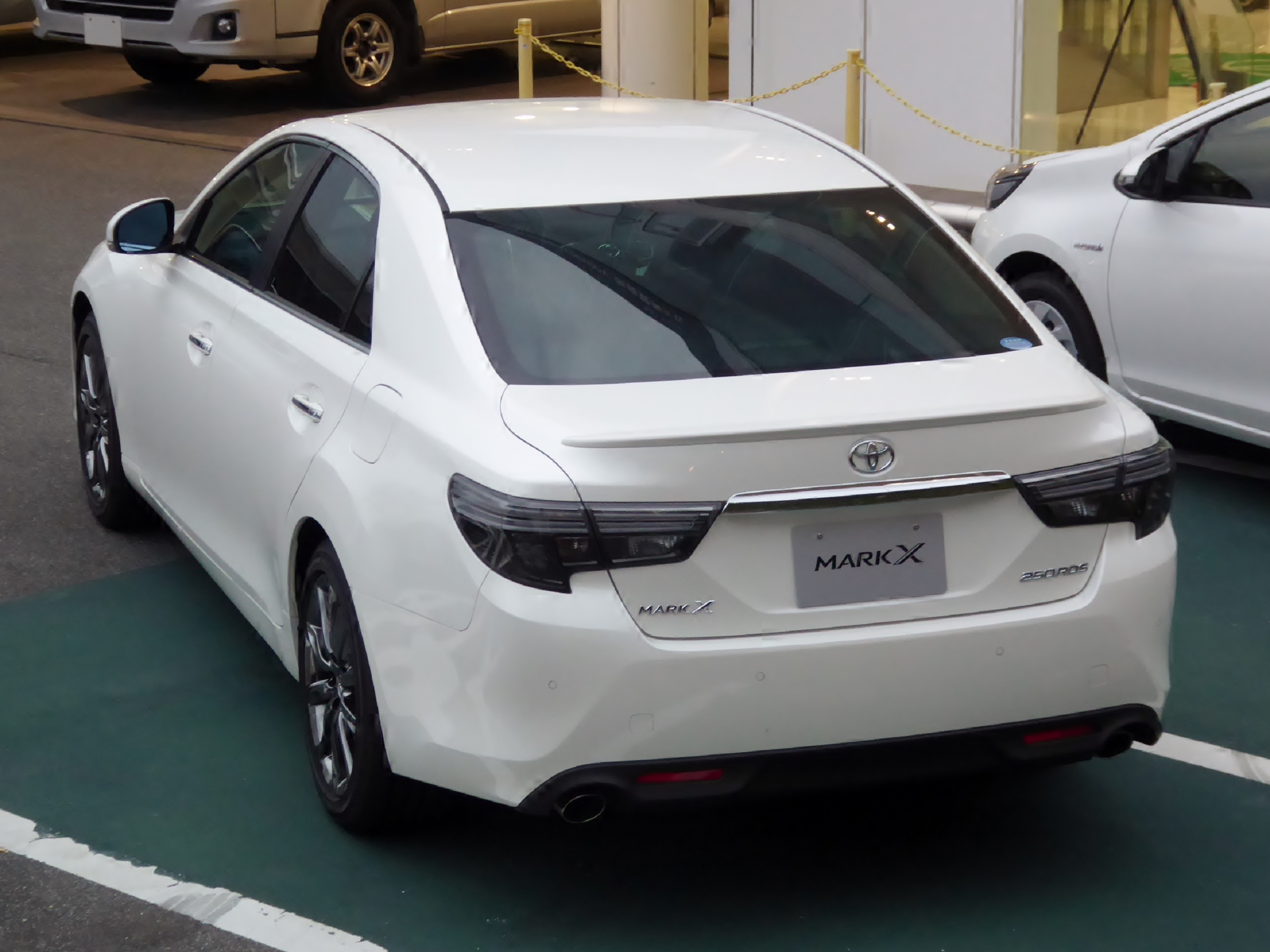
2017 Mark X 250RDS (GRX130; second facelift, Japan)

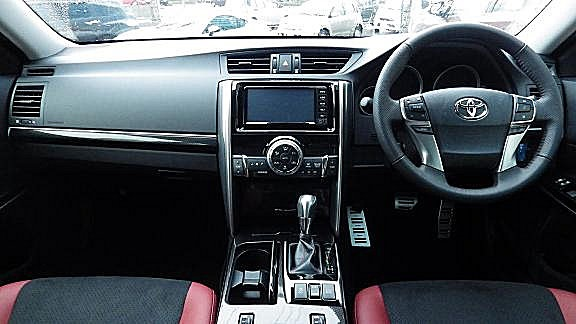
Second facelift interior

=== Special versions ===
==== Sports Plus ====
The Sports Plus is a version of the Mark X Sports with a 2.5 L engine, sold in Hong Kong and Macau. It includes front and rear spoilers, front fog lamps, gear shift paddles, electronically controlled suspension, leather seat and front seat heater.

==== Yellow Label ====
Released in September 2014 for the Japanese market only, the Mark X Yellow Label edition is based on the choice of 250G, 250G Four, or 250G "S Package". It was offered in special edition Awaken Yellow exterior paint, as well as white, silver, or black regular colours. Inside, it features black and yellow seats and door trims. It also came with stainless scuff plates with yellow Mark X lettering.

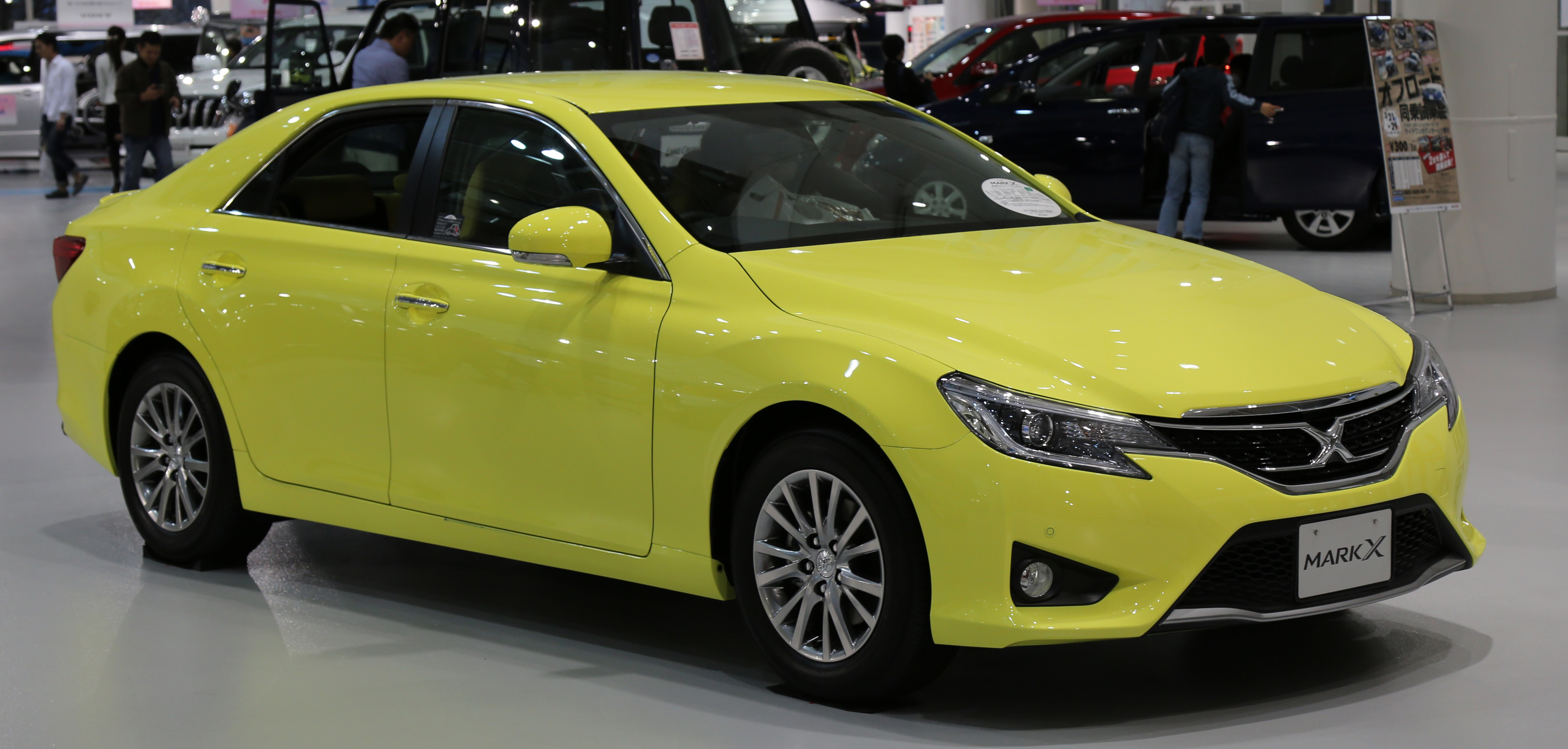
2015 Mark X 250G Yellow Label (GRX130; first facelift, Japan)

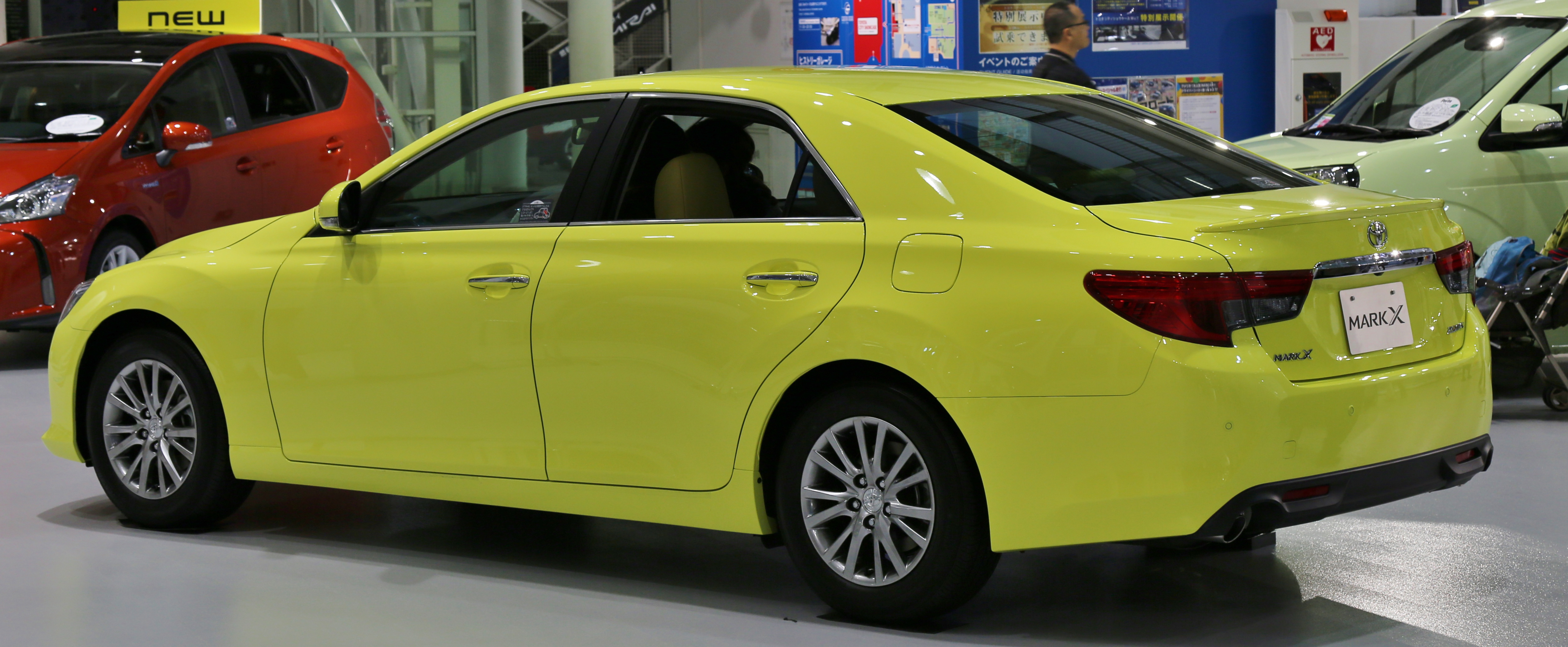
2015 Mark X 250G Yellow Label (GRX130; first facelift, Japan)

==== Mark X +M Super Charger/Vertiga ====
As with the previous generation Mark X, Toyota's in-house tuning company Modellista installed a supercharger on the 3.5 L 2GR-FSE engine and marketed as Mark X +M Super Charger. The power output is rated at 265 kW (355 hp; 360 PS) and 498 N⋅m (367 lb⋅ft) of torque. Modellista also produced a non-supercharged version of the Mark X called Vertiga.

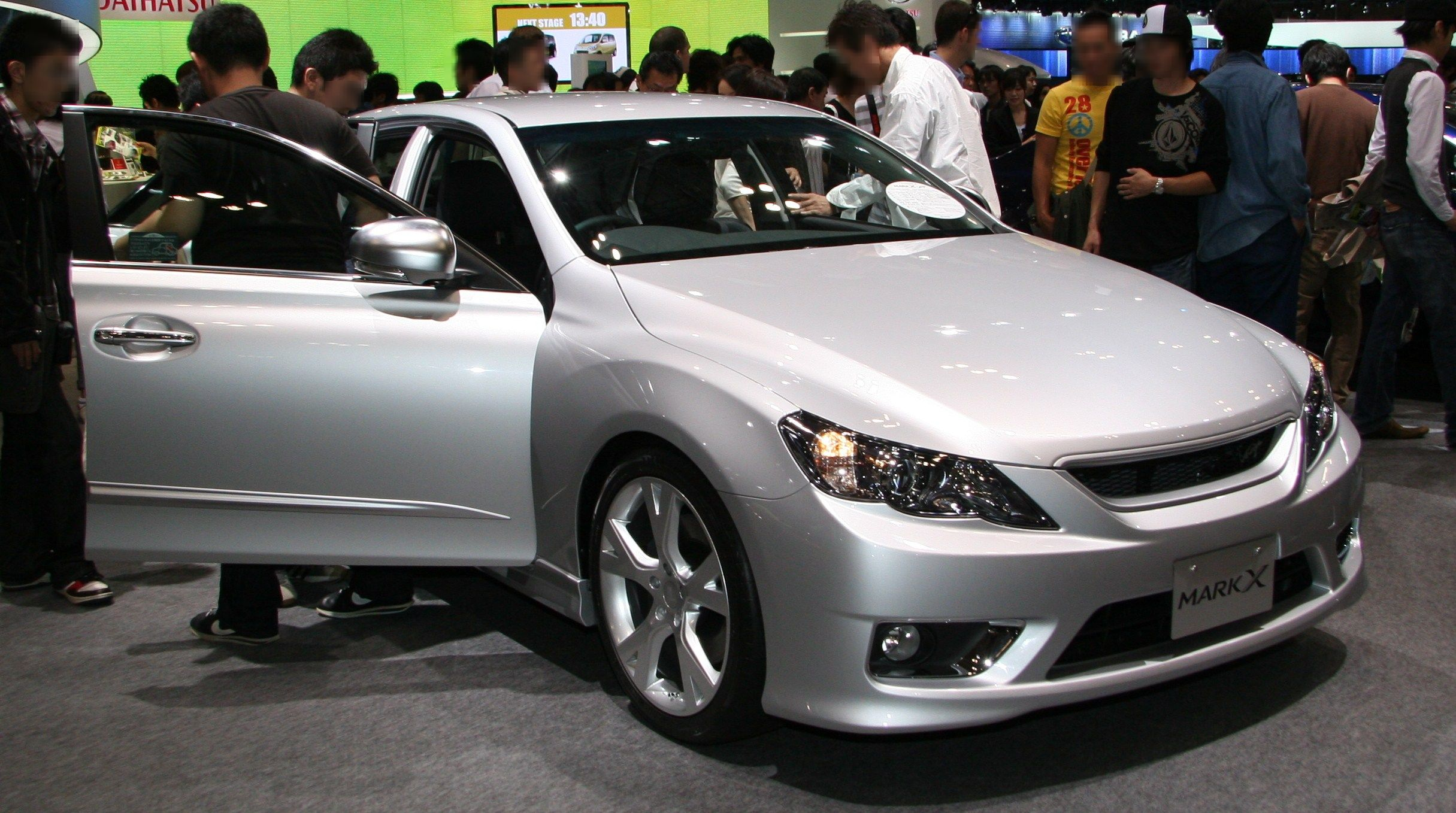
Mark X Vertiga (pre-facelift)

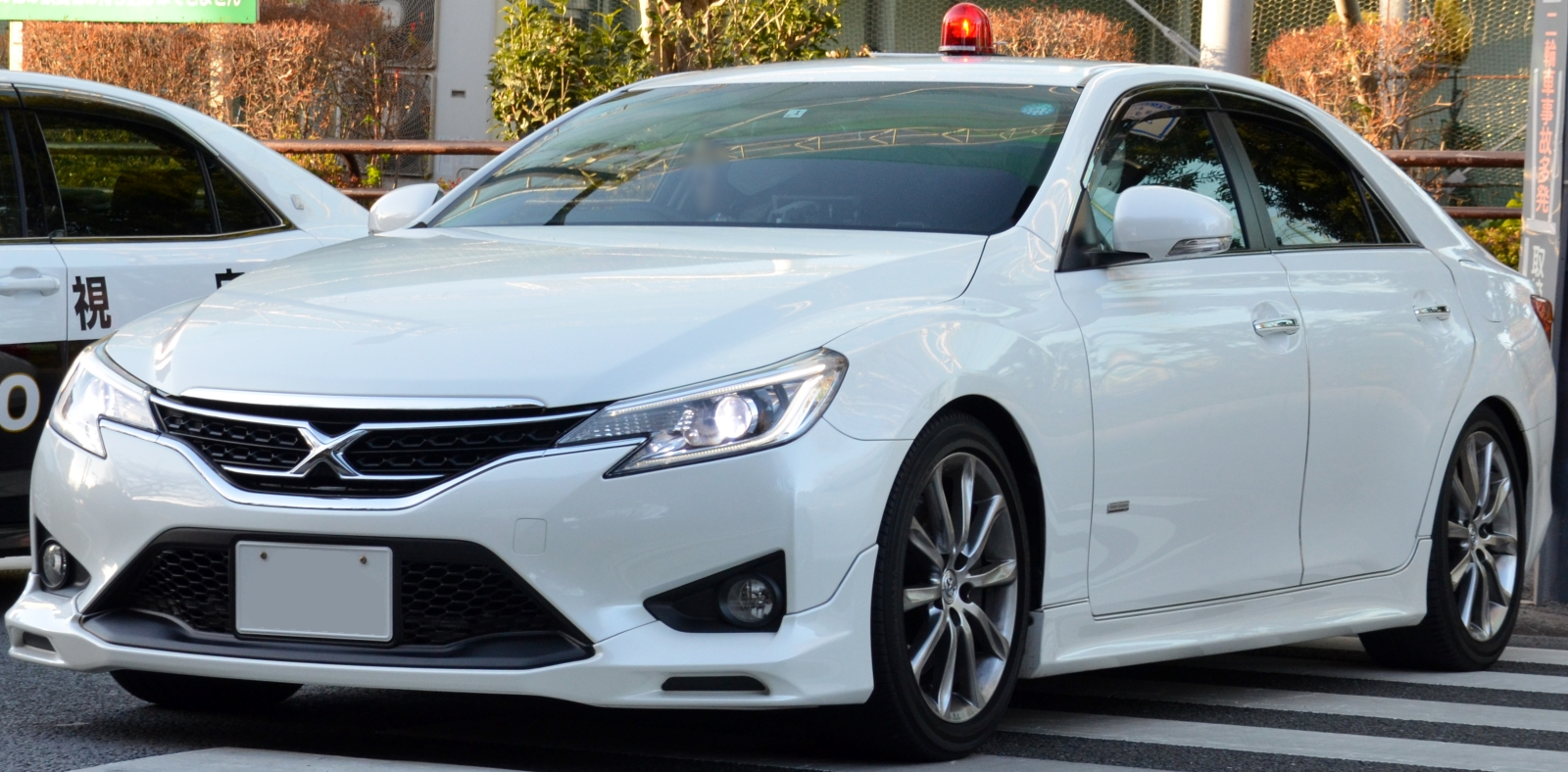
Mark X +M Super Charger unmarked car (first facelift)

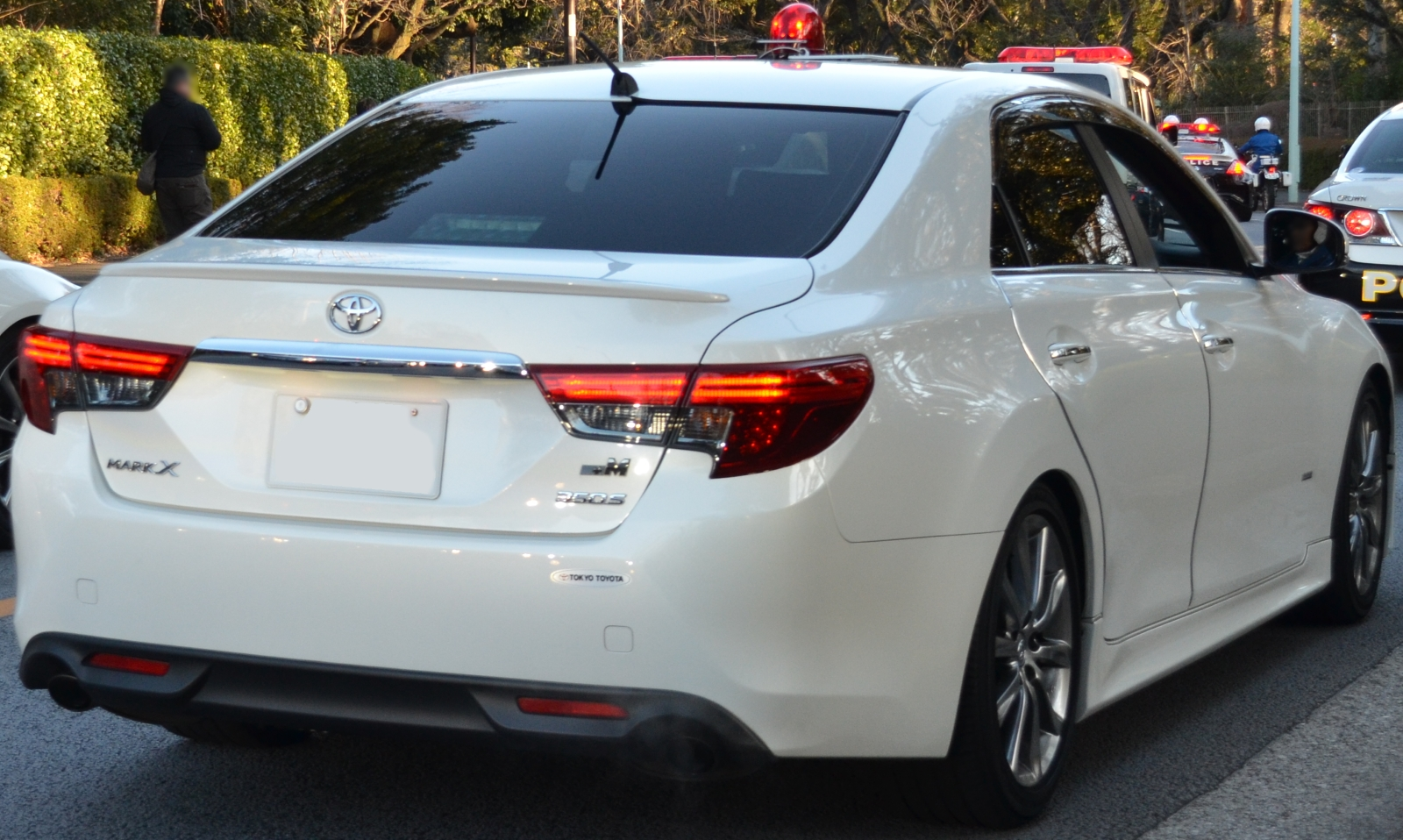
Mark X +M Super Charger unmarked car (first facelift)

==== G's/GR Sport ====
The G's (renamed to GR Sport in 2016) variant is based on 250S or 350S models. The G's/GR Sport Mark X is distinctly different in appearance with a three-piece bodykit, rear boot spoiler, clear smoked taillamps, forged aluminium 19x8J wheels, four-piston calipers with 356 mm (14.0 in) front and 310 mm (12.2 in) rear ventilated brake disks, upgraded suspension, red stitching leather interior, carbon style centre console and instrument panel, upgraded Alcantara front seats, etc.

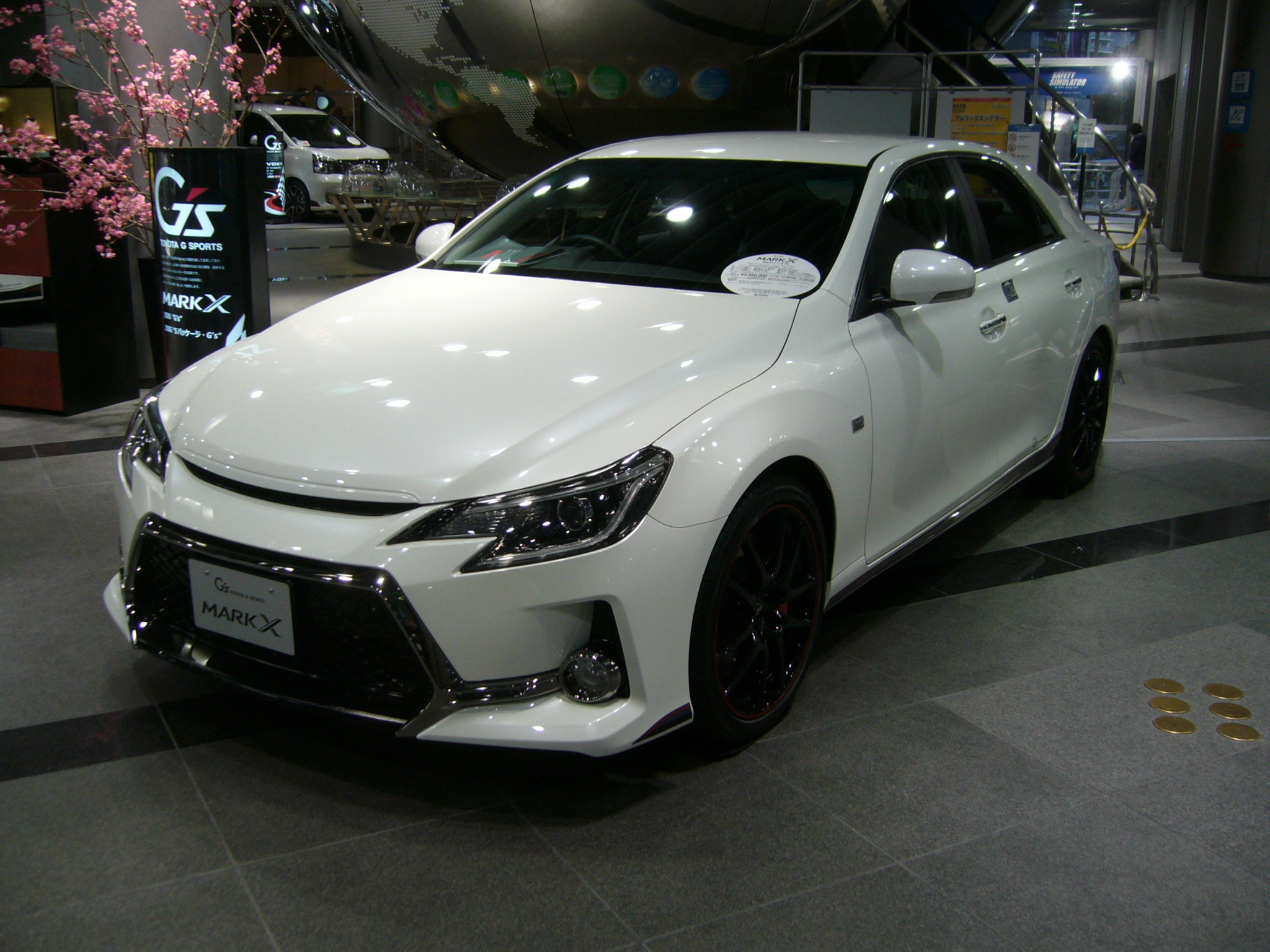
2013 Mark X 250G S Package G's (GRX130, Japan)

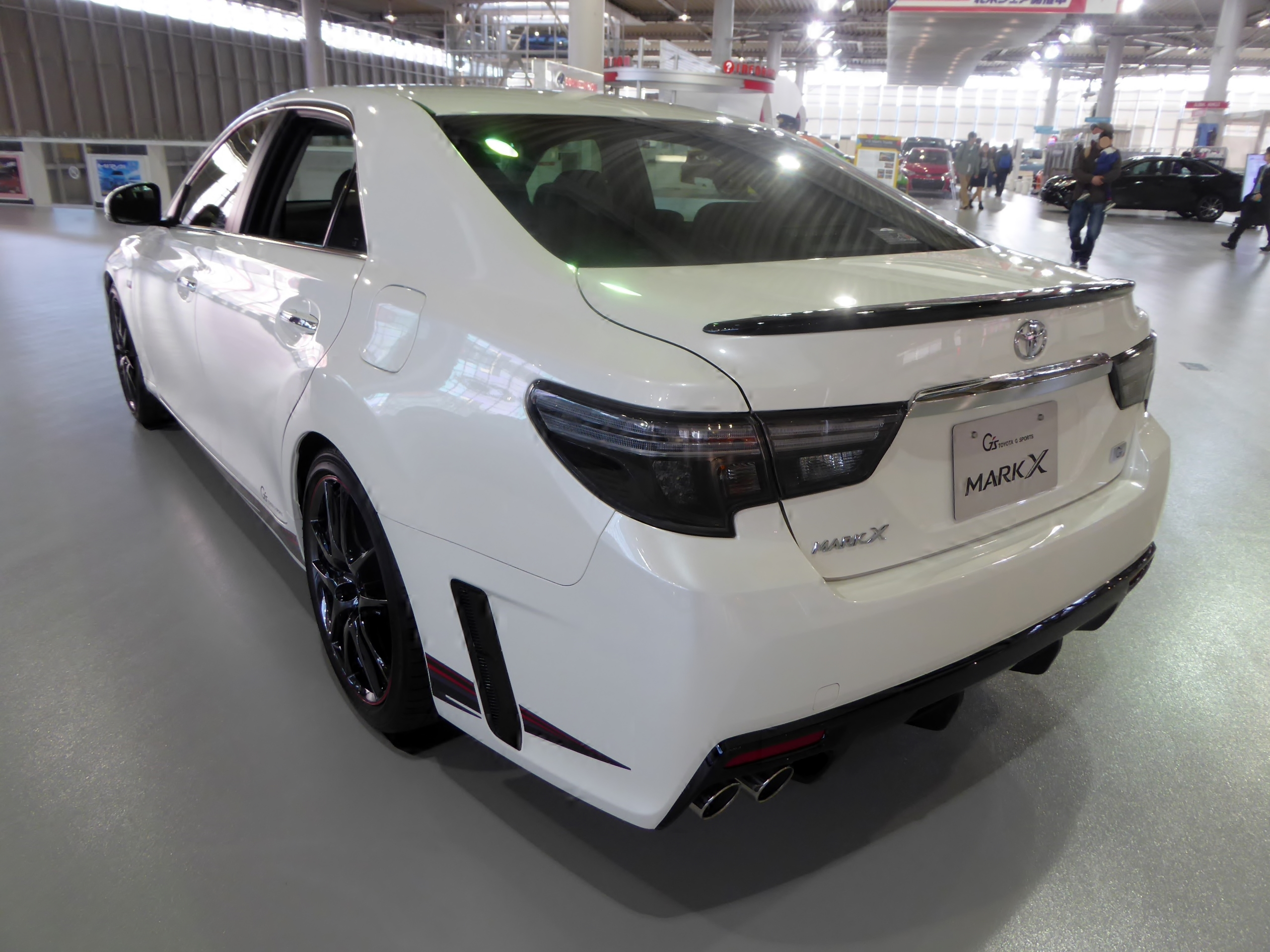
2013 Mark X 350S G's (GRX133, Japan)

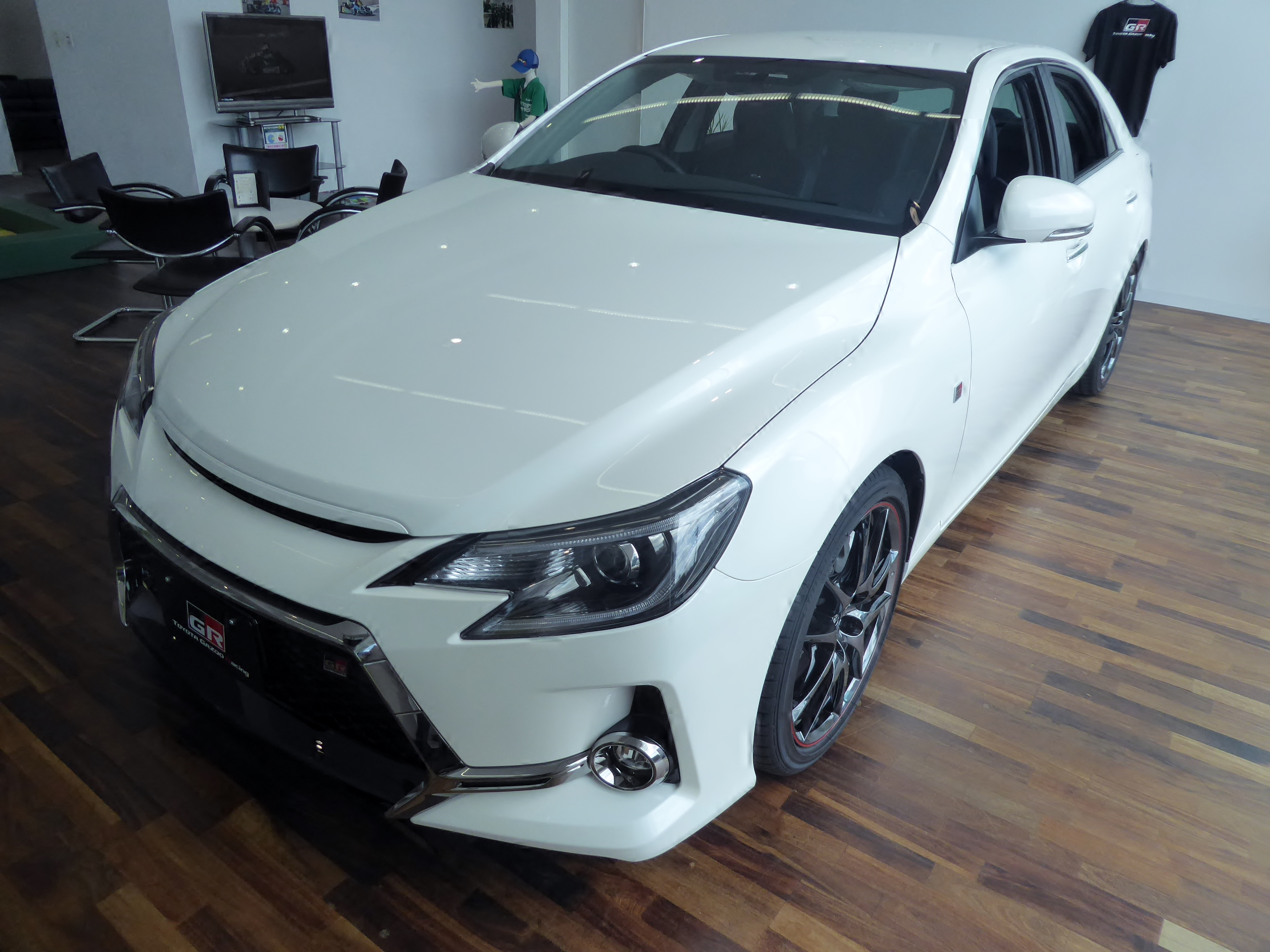
2019 Mark X 250S GR Sport (GRX130, Japan)

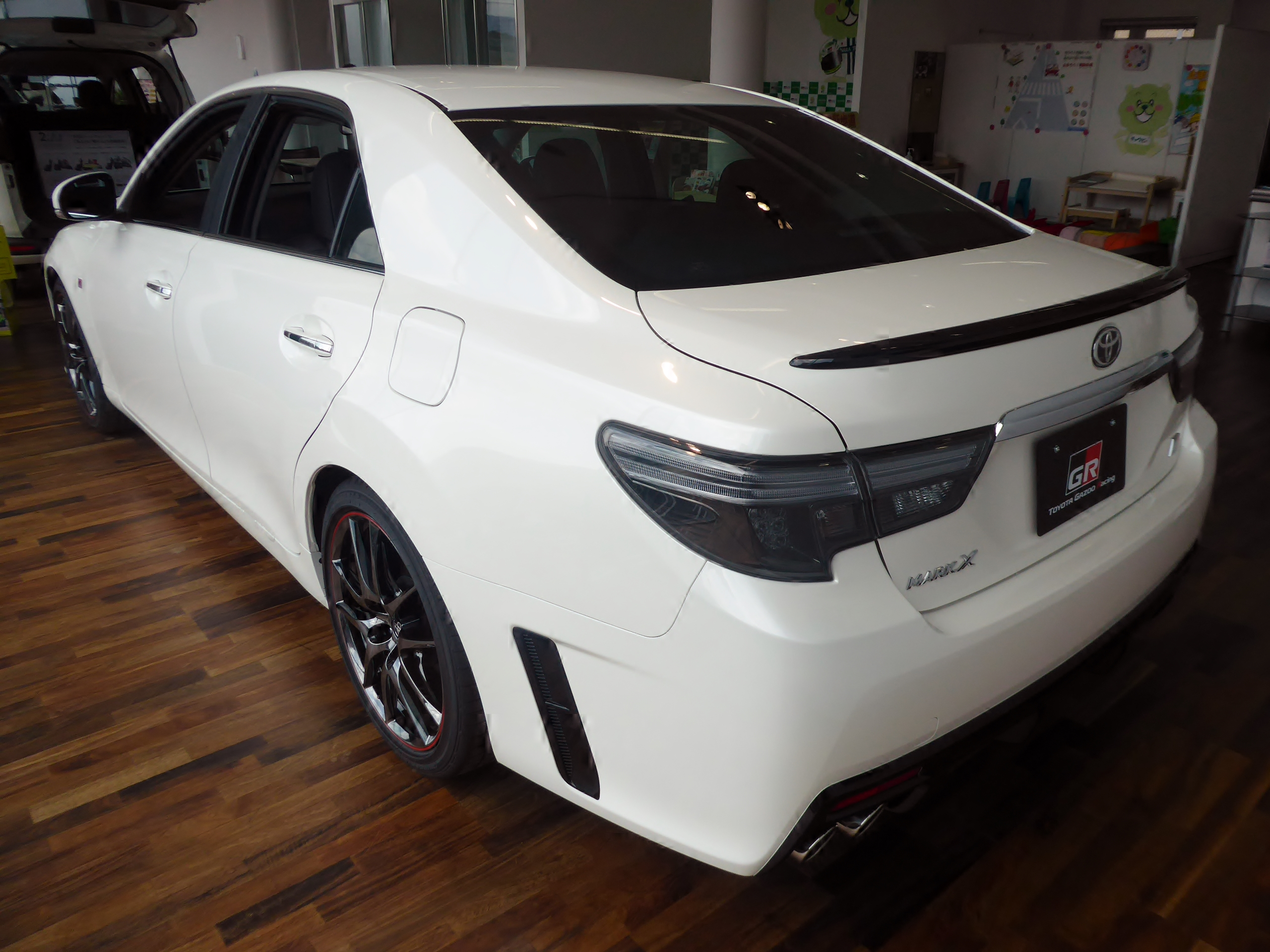
2019 Mark X 250S GR Sport (GRX130, Japan)

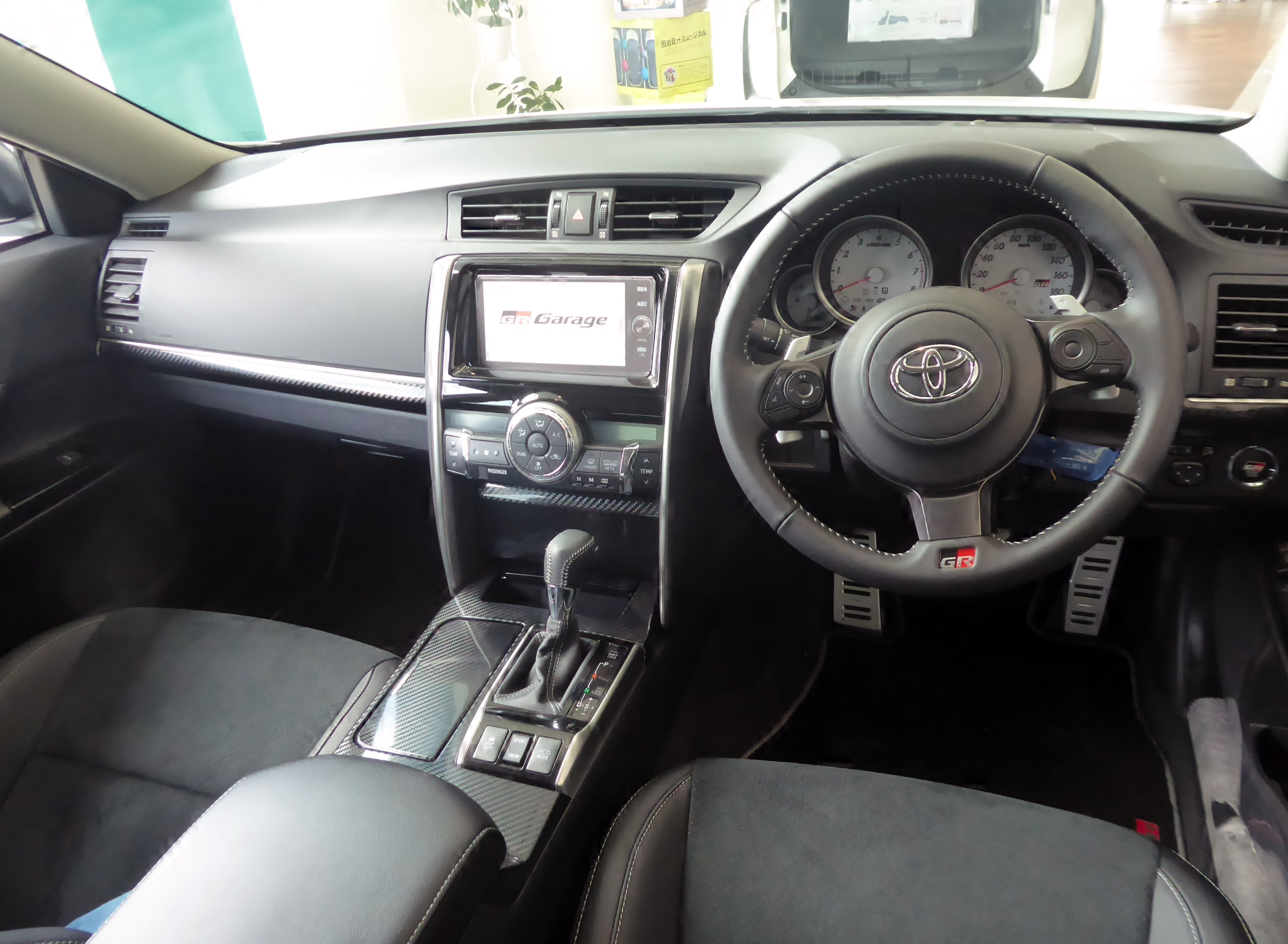
2019 Mark X 250S GR Sport interior

==== GRMN ====
The Mark X GRMN (Gazoo Racing, tuned by the Meister of the Nürburgring) is a limited-production variant (100 units in 2015, 350 units in 2019) based on the 3.5 L model. It has a specific front and rear bumper design (shared with the GR Sport variant for 2019 model), CFRP roof which reduces the weight by approximately 10 kg (22 lb), 19-inch BBS wheels, sports seats and steering wheel, and piano black interior accents with ultrasuede upholstery and red contrast stitching. Mechanical upgrades include uprated power output to 236 kW (321 PS; 316 hp) for the 2015 model, 6-speed manual transmission with Torsen limited-slip differential, sport-tuned suspension, high-performance brakes, and additional chassis reinforcements, which include 252 additional chassis spot welds for greater rigidity, coupled with specific-tuned dampers and electric power steering.

The 2019 re-release has slightly different specifications, with the engine now producing 234 kW (318 PS; 314 hp) at 6,400 rpm. The lightweight, carbon fibre roof was an option for the second release.

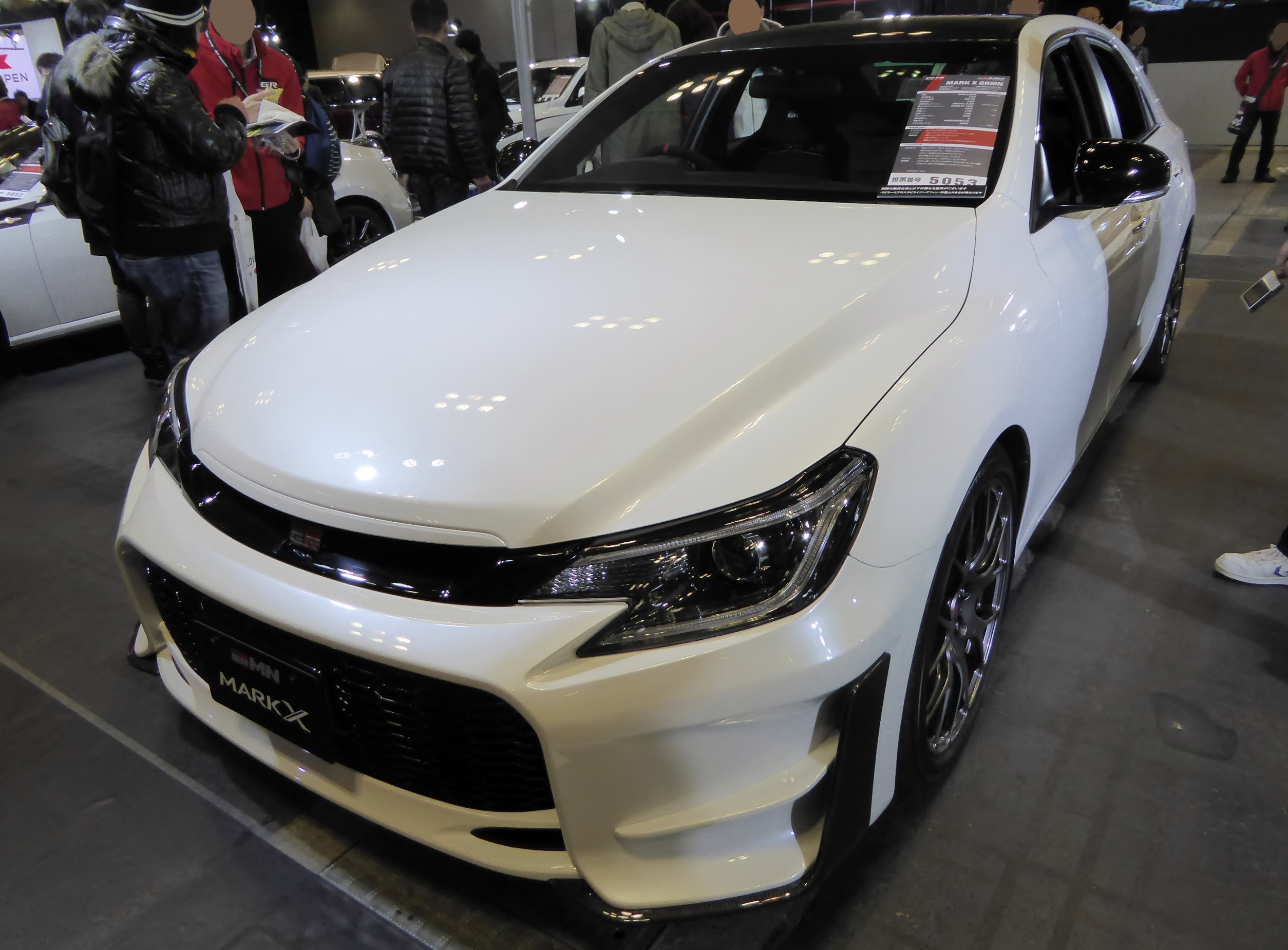
2015 Mark X GRMN (GRX133, Japan)

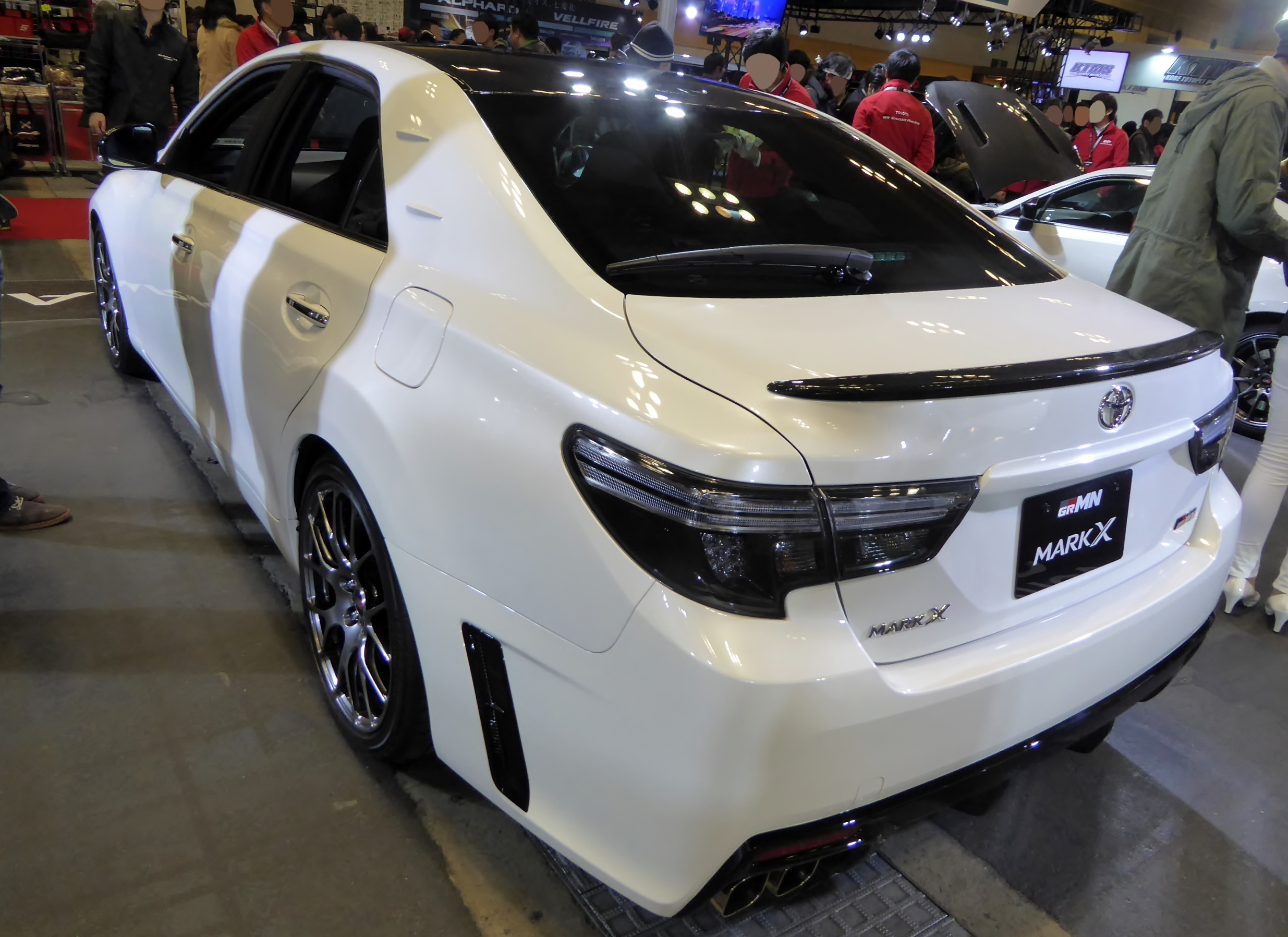
2015 Mark X GRMN (GRX133, Japan)

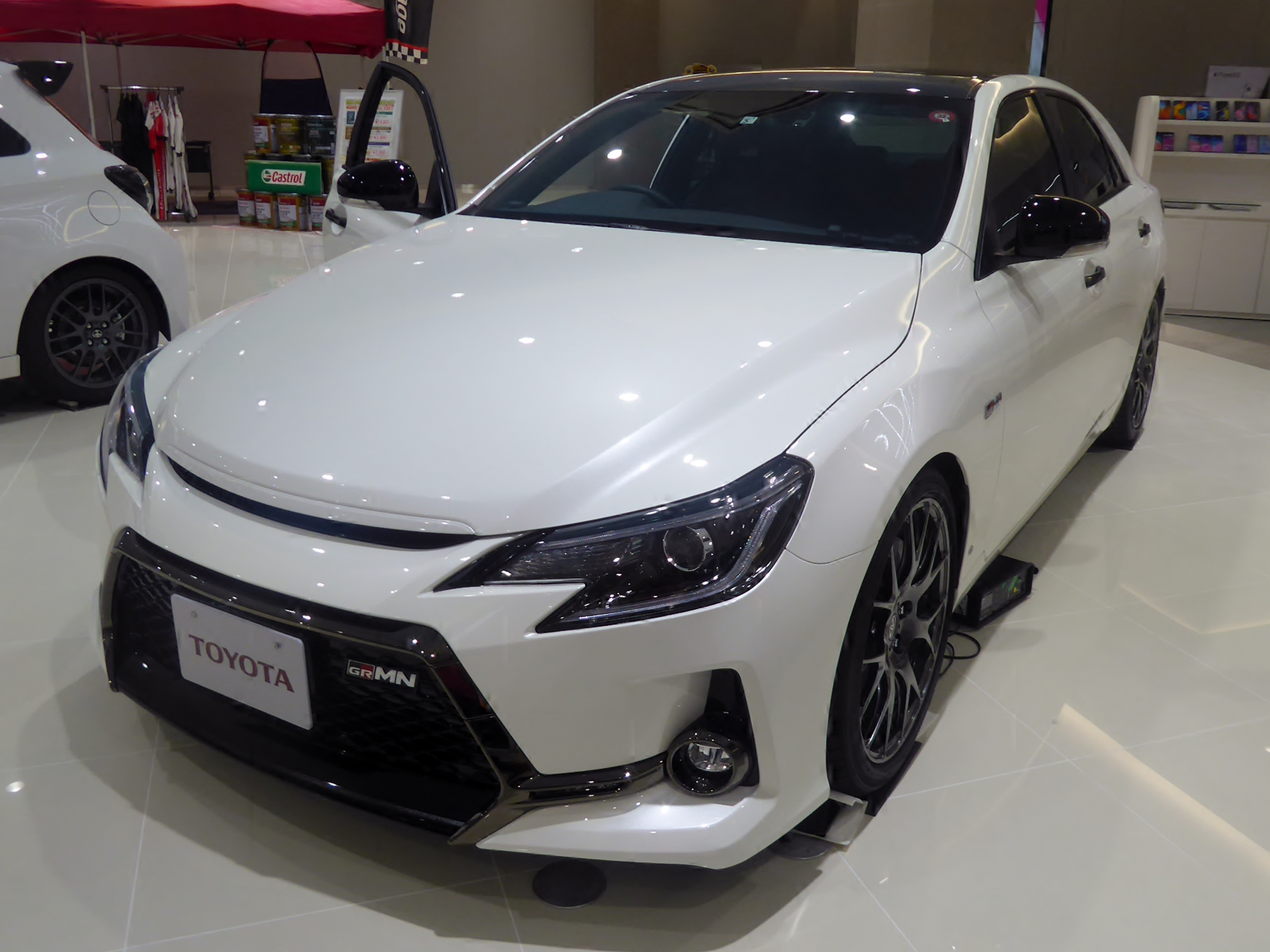
2019 Mark X GRMN (GRX133, Japan)

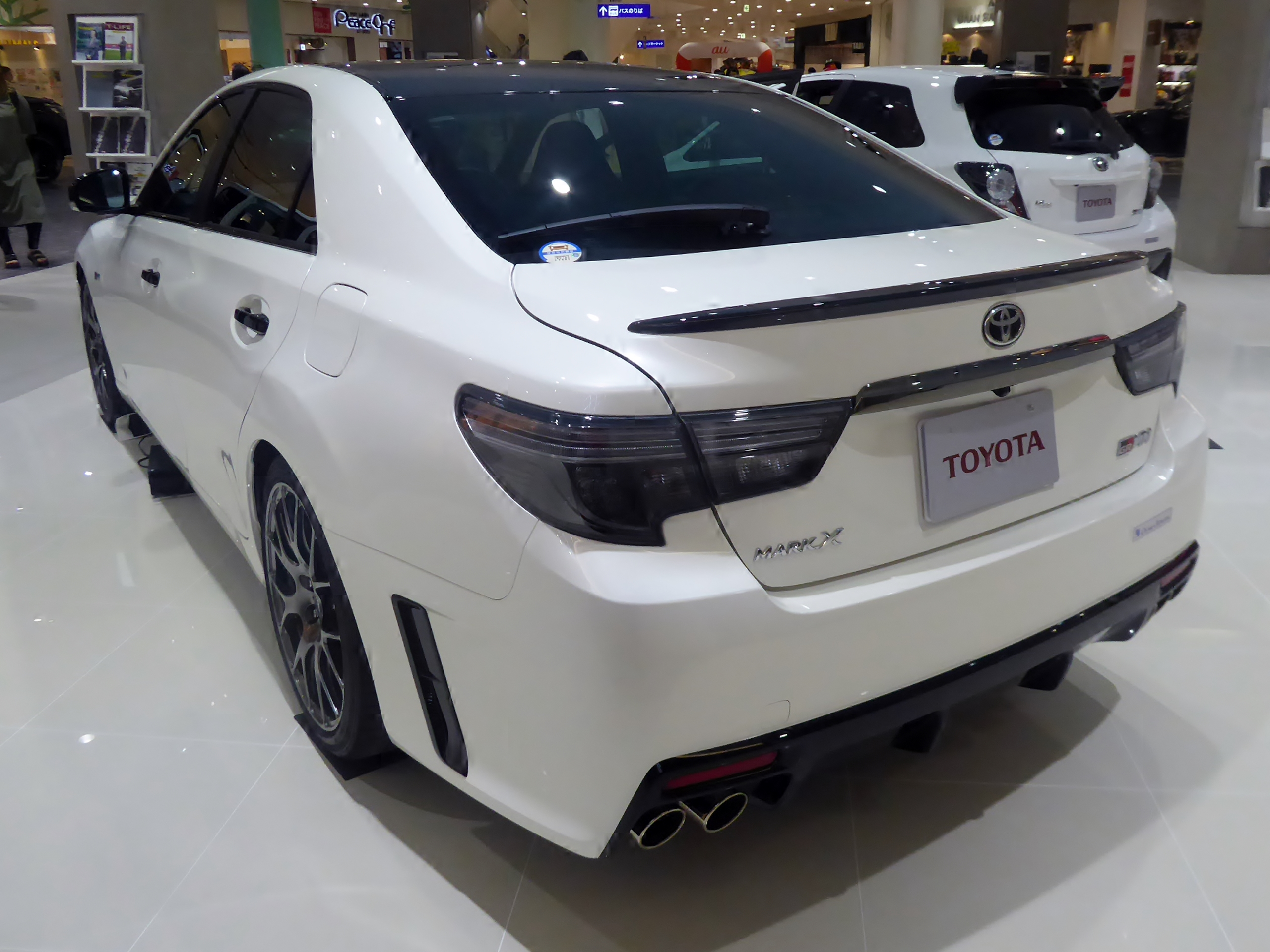
2019 Mark X GRMN (GRX133, Japan)

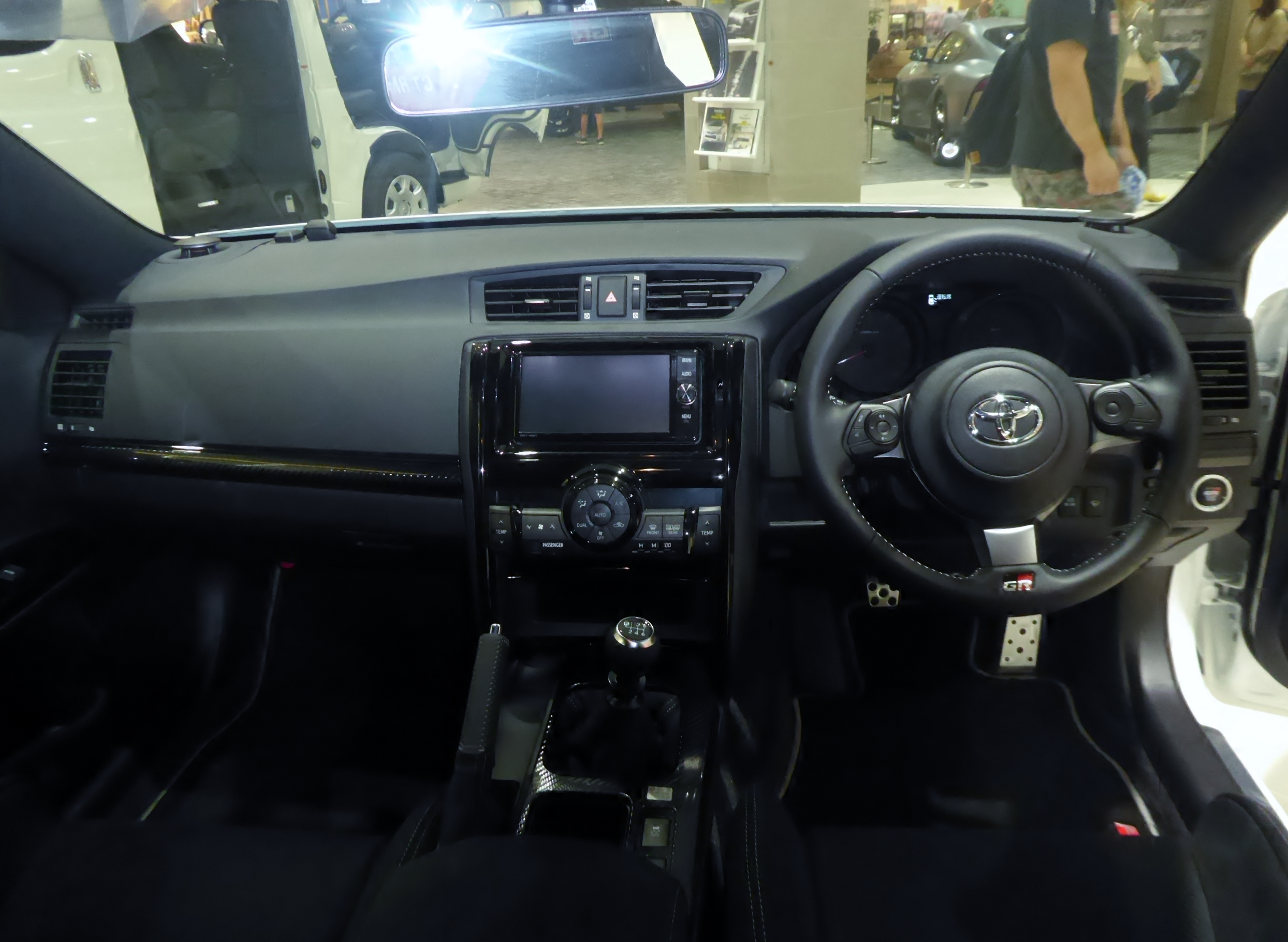
2019 Mark X GRMN interior

=== Reiz (China) ===
The second-generation Reiz was launched in September 2010, and offered with either 2.5-litre 5GR-FE or 3.0-litre 3GR-FE V6 engine.

The facelift model was released in 2013.

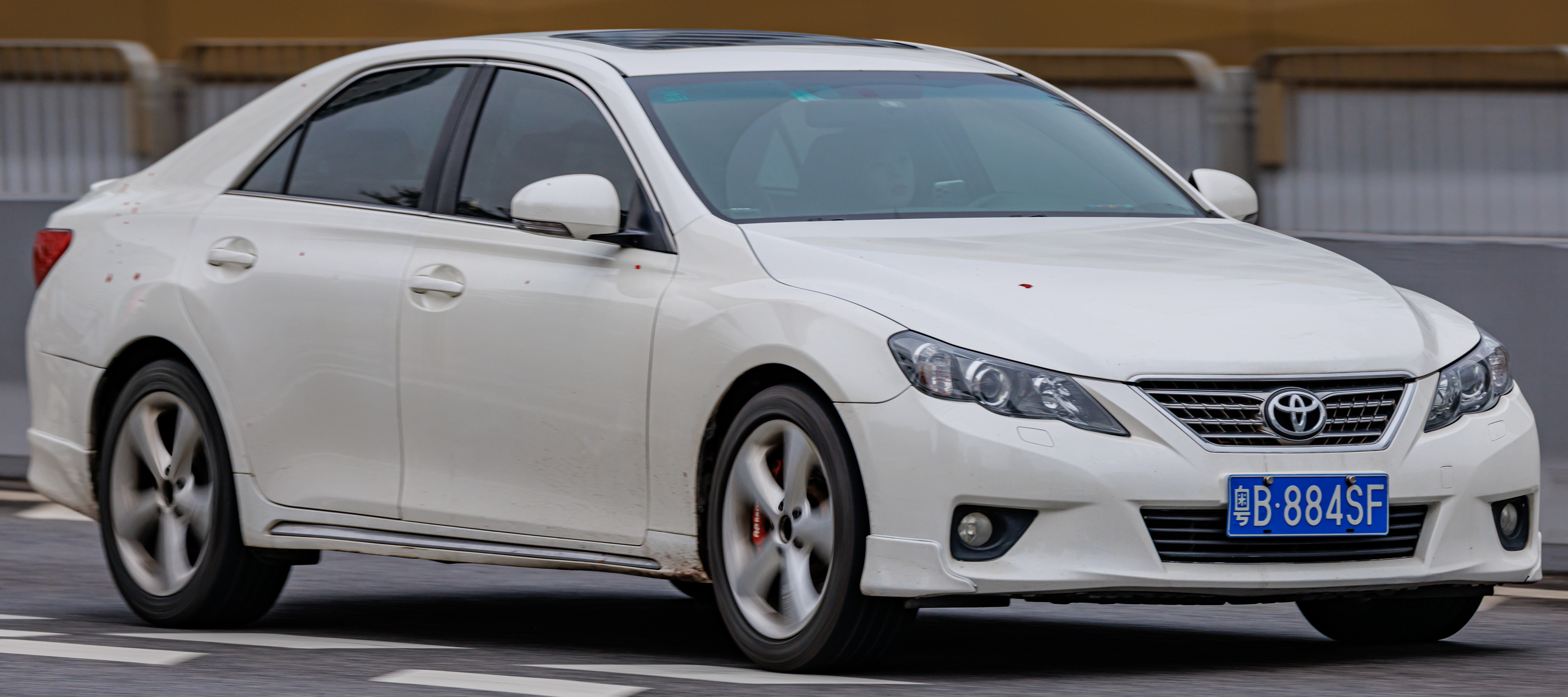
Pre-facelift Reiz

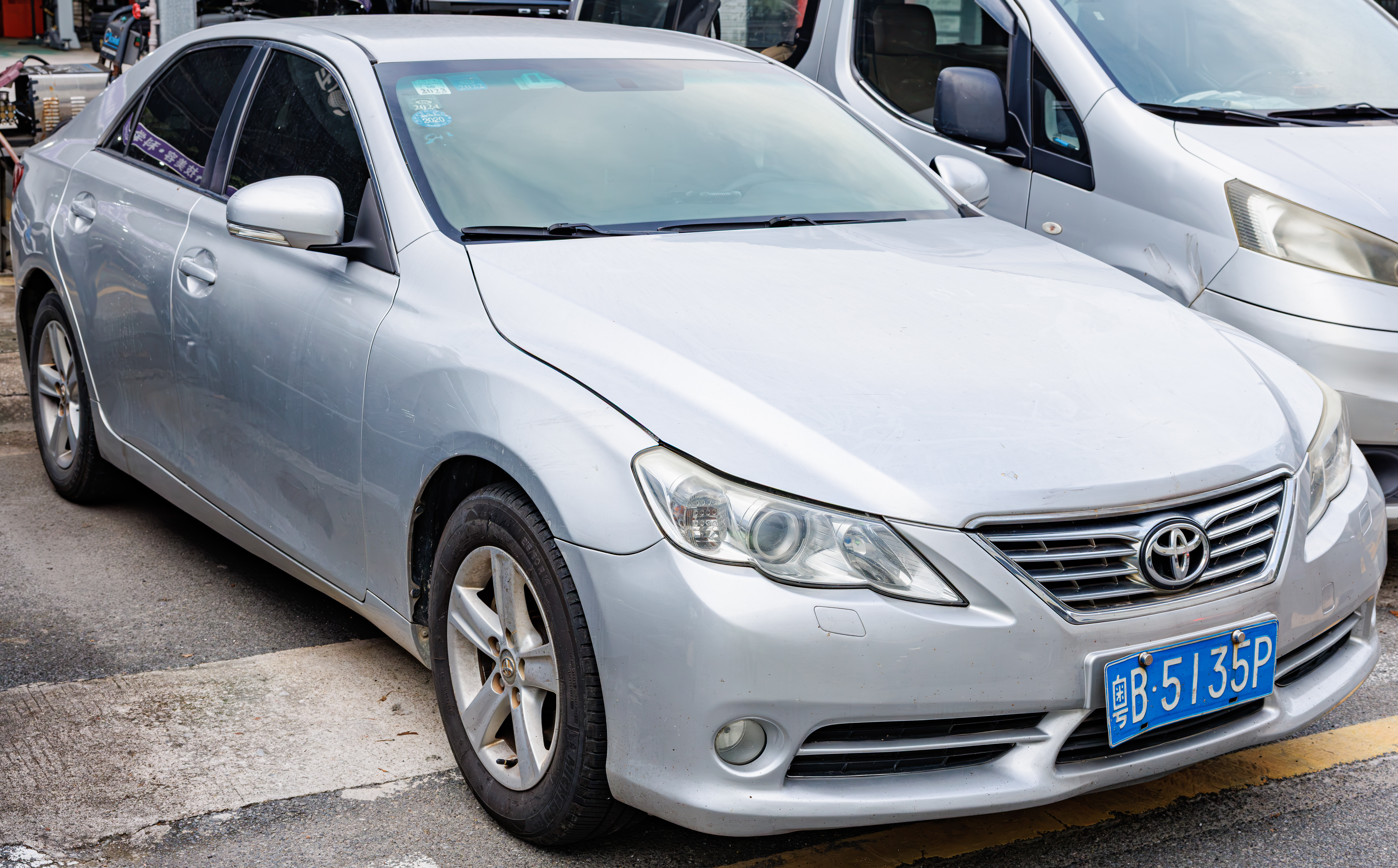
Pre-facelift Reiz 2.5V

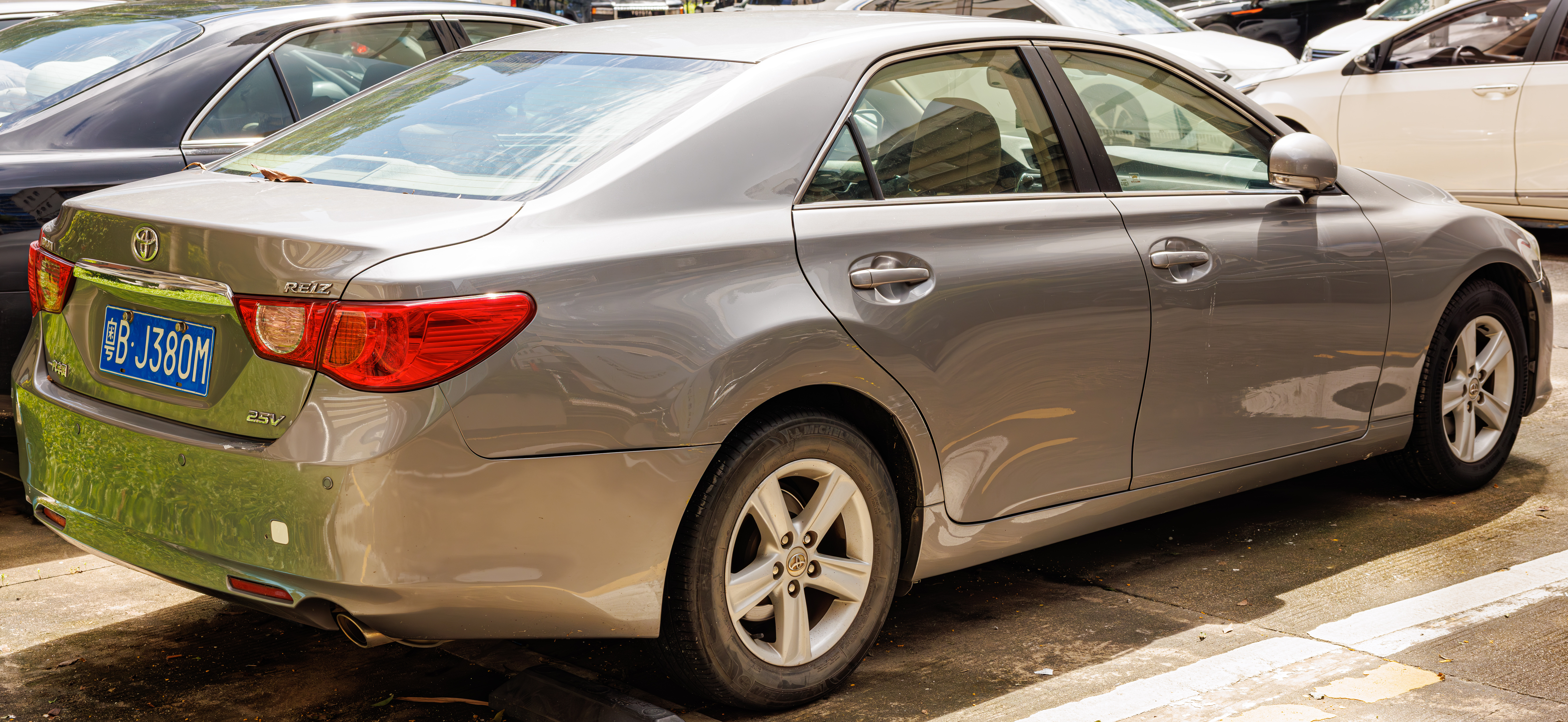
Pre-facelift Reiz 2.5V

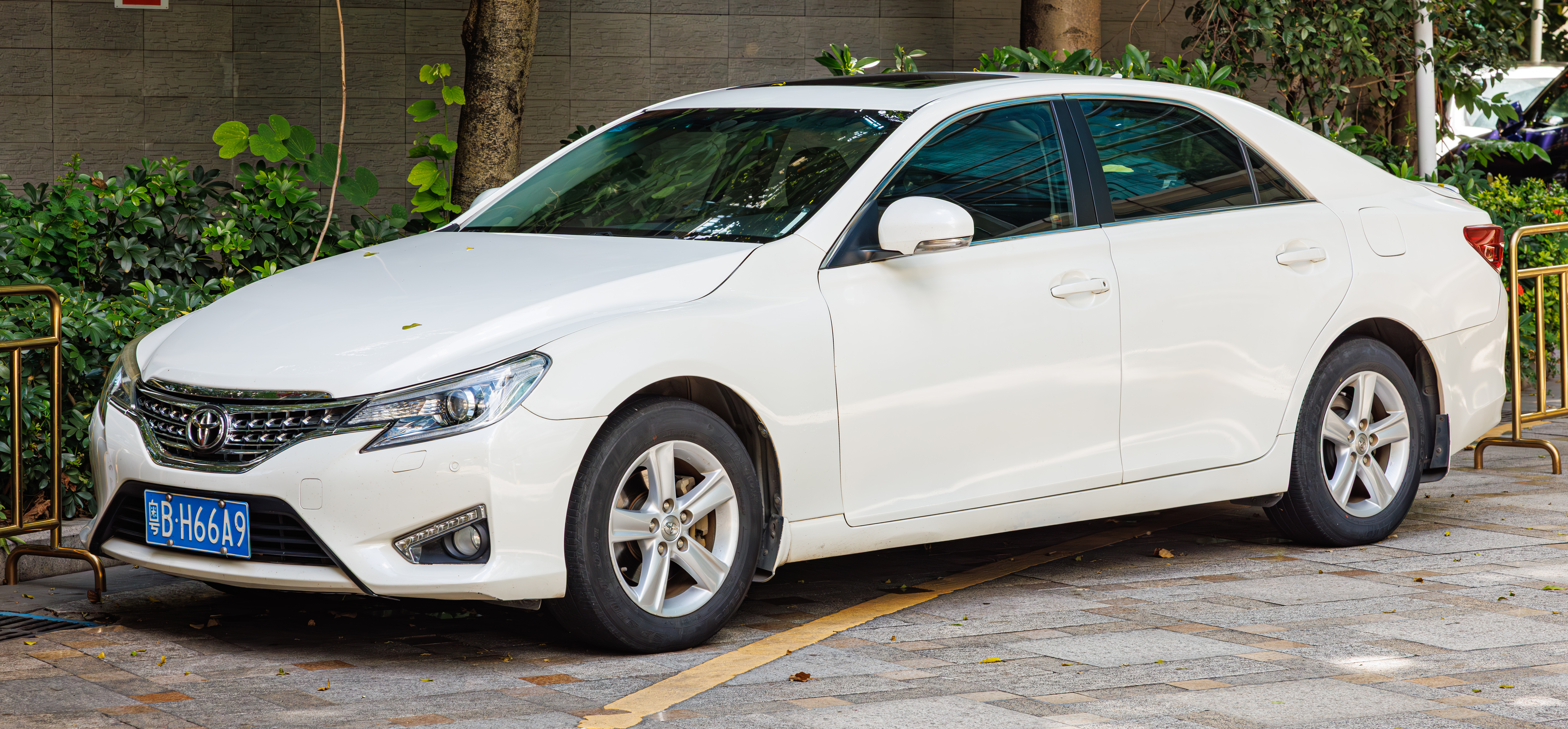
Facelift Reiz

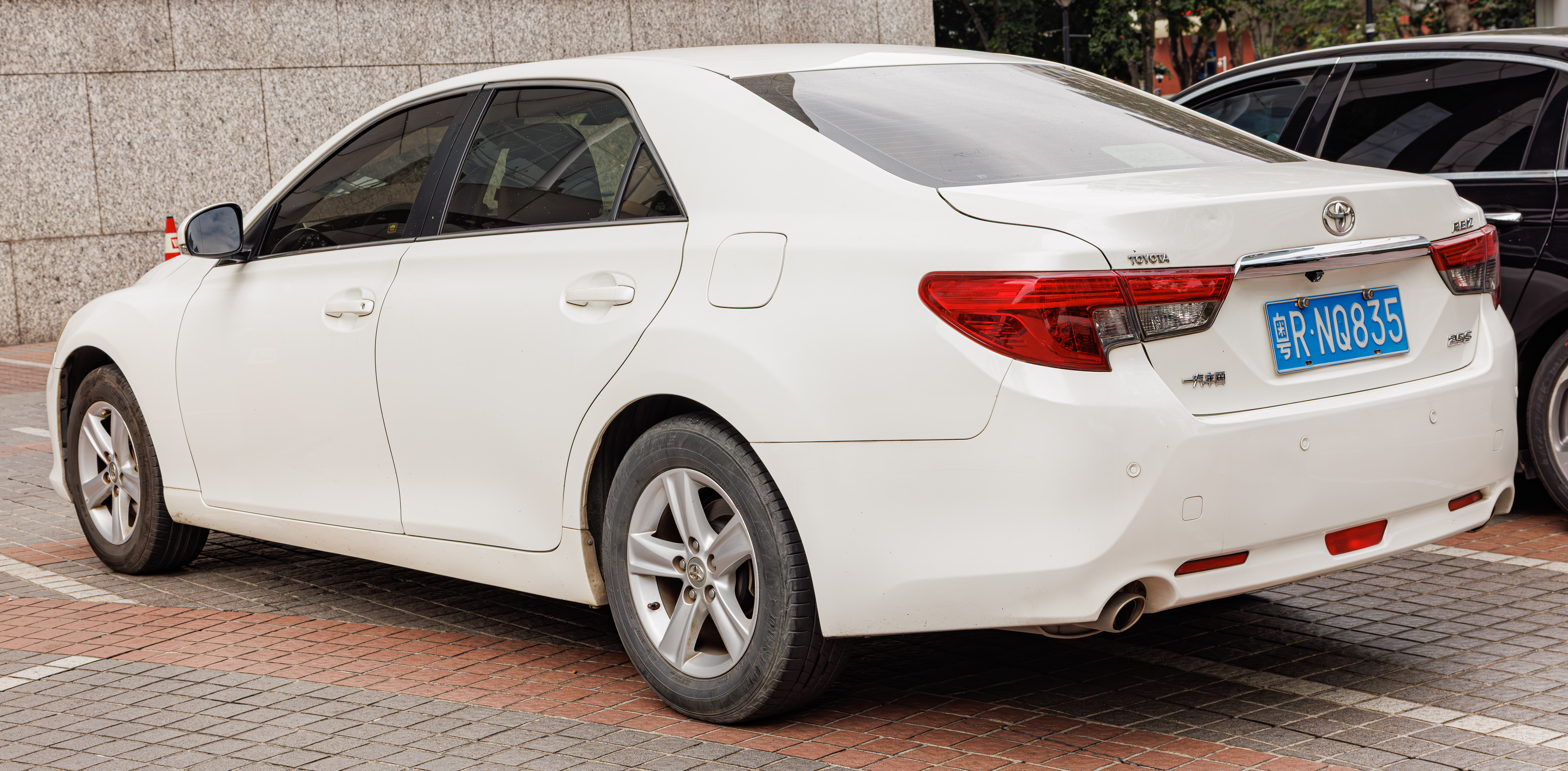
Facelift Reiz 2.5 S

=== Discontinuation ===
On 27 September 2017, Toyota ended production of the Reiz in China with a total of 528,188 units produced since 2004.

Production of the Mark X ended on 23 December 2019 in Japan with a total of 6.9 million units (including the Mark II) produced since the first production of Corona Mark II began 51 years earlier. Before the discontinuation, Toyota released the limited-production Mark X 250S Final Edition. The Final Edition comes equipped with 18-inch aluminium wheels, dark chrome-plated front bumper trim, and a red and black interior finished in Alcantara and leather. This marked the end of the Mark II lineage that was introduced in 1968.

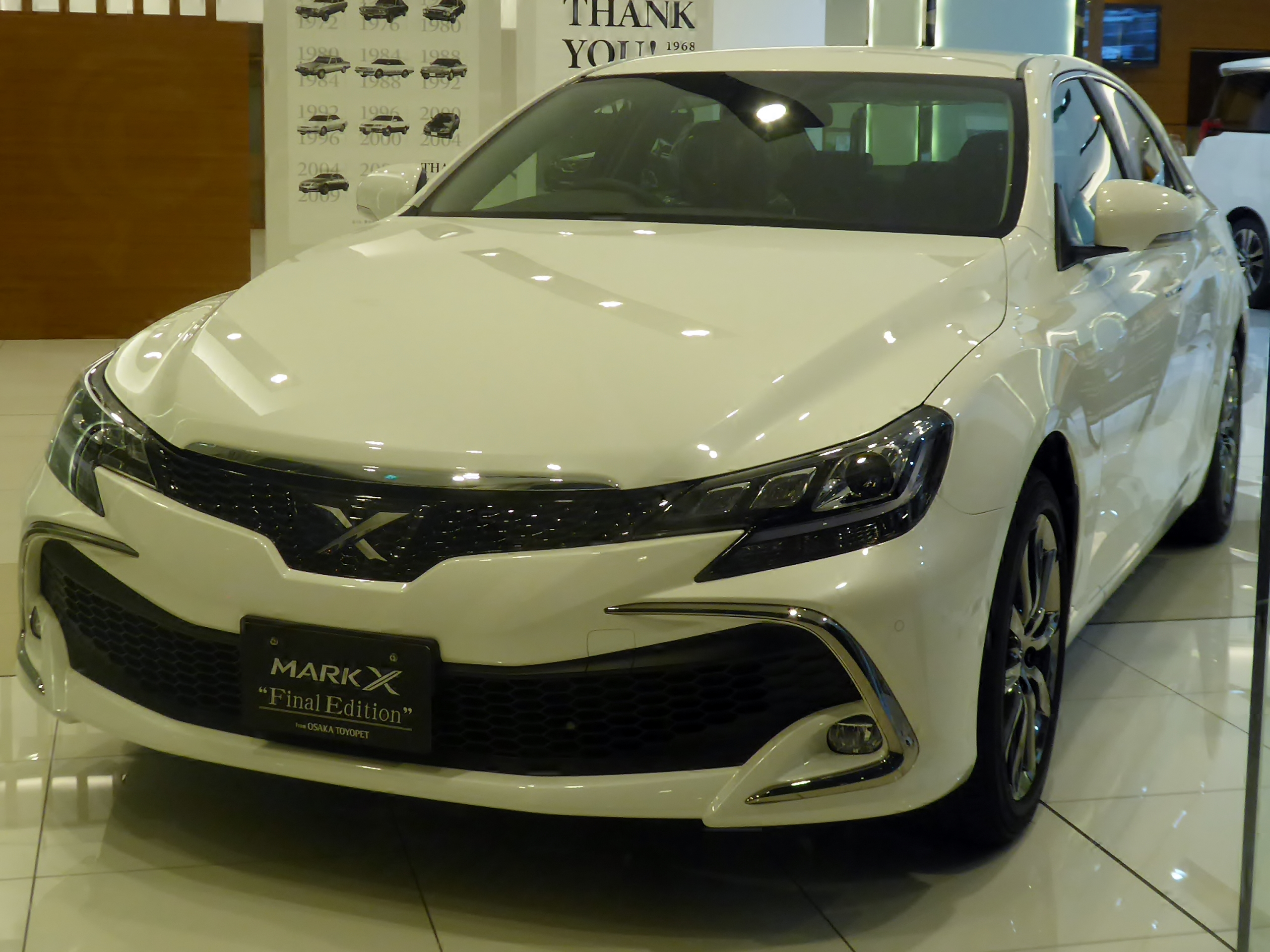
2019 Mark X 250S Final Edition (GRX130, Japan)

== Mark X ZiO ==
The Mark X ZiO MPV shares only a name with the Mark X saloon and is based on the smaller front-wheel drive New MC platform.
