= Toyota Corolla Cross =

Japanese compact crossover SUV

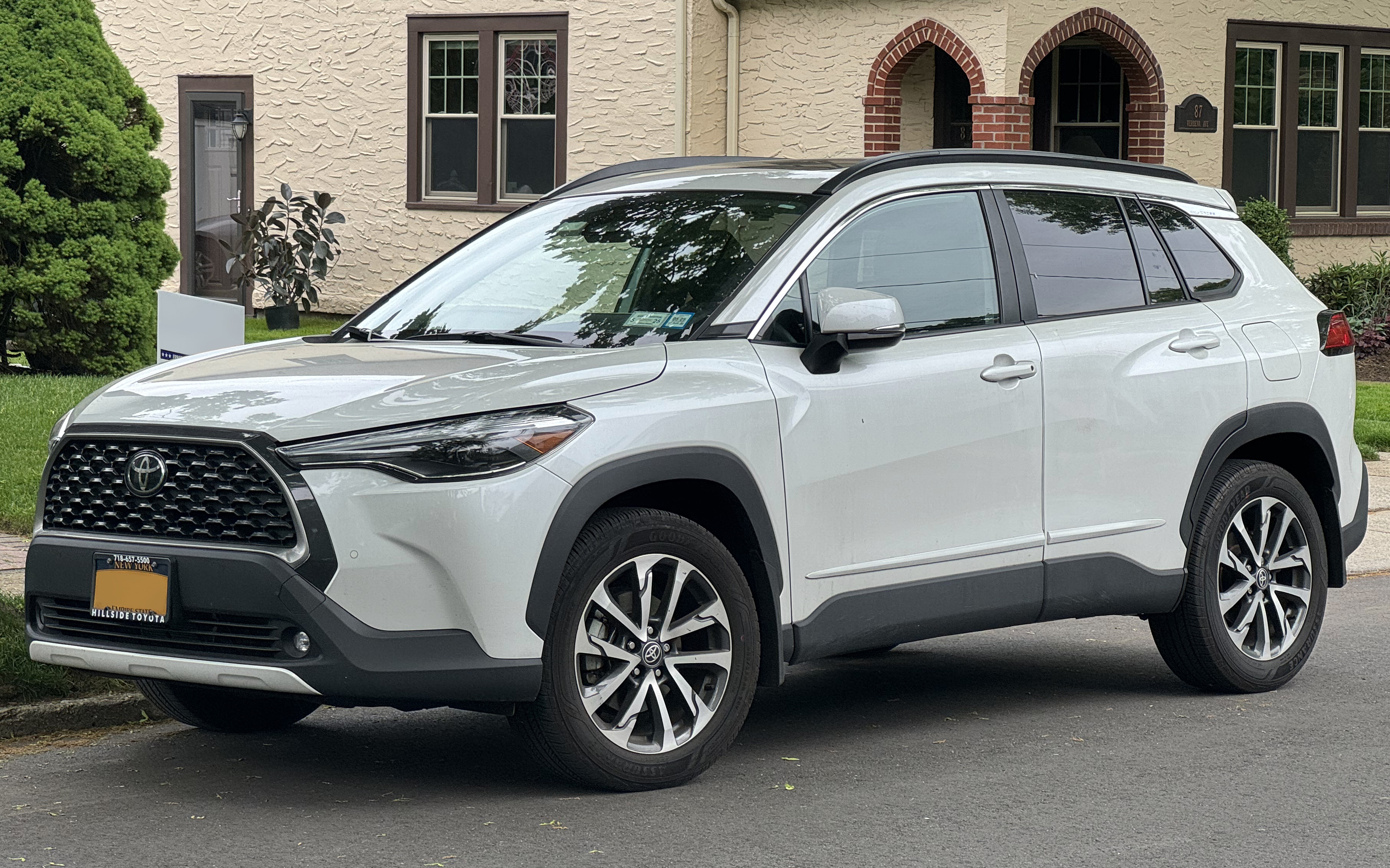
- 2023 Toyota Corolla Cross XLE 4WD (MXGA15, US)

Overview
- Manufacturer: Toyota
- Model code: XG10
- Also called: Toyota Frontlander (China, GAC Toyota); Toyota Cross (Brunei); Toyota Corolla X SUV (Morocco)
- Production: July 2020 – present
- Model years: 2022–present (North America)
- Assembly: Japan: Toyota, Aichi (Takaoka plant 2021–2025); Kanegasaki, Iwate (Iwate plant 2025–present); Thailand: Chachoengsao (TMT); Taiwan: Zhongli (Kuozui); Brazil: Sorocaba, São Paulo; United States: Huntsville, Alabama (MTMUS); Malaysia: Bukit Raja (UMW); China: Tianjin (FAW Toyota); Guangzhou (GAC Toyota, Frontlander); South Africa: Prospecton (TSAM); Pakistan: Karachi (Toyota Indus)
- Designer: List: Kenichi Okamura (exterior design leader); Ken Billes, Shota Asano, Tokiko Hirai and Yukihiro Koide (exterior); Yoshiki Ito (interior design leader); Masamichi Kajita (interior)

Body and chassis
- Class: Compact crossover SUV (C)
- Body style: 5-door SUV
- Layout: Front-engine, front-wheel-drive; Front-engine, four-wheel-drive
- Platform: TNGA: GA-C
- Related: Toyota Corolla Deck; Toyota Corolla (E210); Toyota C-HR (AX10/50); Lexus UX

Powertrain
- Engine: Petrol: 1798 cc 2ZR-FE/2ZR-FAE I4 (ZSG10); 1986 cc M20A-FKS I4 (MXGA10/15; Japan and North America); 1986 cc M20C-FKS I4 (MXGA10; Frontlander); 1986 cc M20E-FKS I4 (MXGA10; China); Petrol flex-fuel: 1798 cc 2ZR-FBE I4 (ZSG10; Thailand); 1986 cc M20A-FKB I4 (MXGA10; Brazil); Petrol hybrid: 1798 cc 2ZR-FXE I4 (ZVG10/11/13/15/16); 1986 cc M20A-FXS I4 (MXGH10/15; Europe); 1987 cc M20F-FXS I4 (MXGH10; Frontlander); 1987 cc M20G-FXS I4 (MXGH10; China)
- Electric motor: List: AC synchronous (hybrid models): 1.8 L hybrid: 1NM (front); 1MM (rear); 2.0 L hybrid: 5NM (front); 4NM (rear)
- Power output: List: 103 kW (138 hp; 140 PS) (2ZR-FE/2ZR-FAE/2ZR-FBE); 72 kW (97 hp; 98 PS) (2ZR-FXE, petrol engine only); 90 kW (121 hp; 122 PS) (2ZR-FXE, combined system output); 126 kW (169 hp; 171 PS) (M20A-FKS/M20C-FKS/M20E-FKS); 130 kW (174 hp; 177 PS) (M20A-FKB); 113–131 kW (152–176 hp; 154–178 PS) (M20A-FXS, petrol engine only); 146 kW (196 hp; 199 PS) (M20A-FXS, combined system output); 53 kW (71 hp; 72 PS) (1NM motor); 5.3 kW (7.1 hp; 7.2 PS) (1MM motor); 83 kW (111 hp; 113 PS) (5NM motor); 30 kW (40 hp; 41 PS) (4NM motor)
- Transmission: K120 CVT with physical first gear (2.0 L petrol); K313 CVT (1.8 L petrol); eCVT (hybrid)
- Hybrid drivetrain: Power-split
- Battery: 6.5-Ah nickel-metal hydride (1.8 L hybrid models 2020-2024); 4.08-Ah lithium-ion (1.8 L and 2.0 L hybrid models)

Dimensions
- Wheelbase: 2,640 mm (103.9 in)
- Length: 4,460–4,490 mm (175.6–176.8 in)
- Width: 1,825 mm (71.9 in)
- Height: 1,620 mm (63.8 in)
- Kerb weight: 1,325 kg (2,921 lb) (petrol models); 1,385 kg (3,053 lb) (hybrid models)

The Toyota Corolla Cross (Japanese: トヨタ・カローラクロス, Hepburn: Toyota Karōra Kurosu) is a compact crossover SUV produced by the Japanese automaker Toyota since 2020. Adopting the Corolla nameplate, it is positioned as a more practical and larger alternative to the C-HR and is built on the same TNGA-C (GA-C) platform as the C-HR, Lexus UX and E210 series Corolla. By size, the Corolla Cross is positioned between the smaller C-HR and the larger RAV4 in Toyota's global crossover SUV lineup, though the former's platform was also used de facto for the Corolla Cross.

It was first unveiled in Thailand in July 2020, along with other Southeast Asian markets and Taiwan in the same year, while its introduction in other markets started in 2021.

The twin model of the Corolla Cross, called the Toyota Frontlander (Chinese: 锋兰达; pinyin: Fēnglándá), is available exclusively in China and was introduced in late 2021.

A pickup version based on the Corolla Cross, called the Corolla Deck was introduced on 18 November 2026. The Corolla Deck will be available in Latin America and Carribean.

== Design ==
The Corolla Cross is the second Toyota crossover built on the GA-C platform, after the smaller C-HR which was launched in 2016. The vehicle shares the same 2,640 mm (103.9 in) wheelbase as the C-HR, but occupies a larger footprint prioritising on interior space and practicality. For the front-wheel drive models, it is equipped with a MacPherson strut front suspension and a torsion beam rear suspension instead of an independent rear suspension used on the regular Corolla and the C-HR to save interior space and cut costs, while all-wheel drive models still come with rear independent units. Development was led by chief engineer Daizo Kameyama.

The interior is shared with the regular Corolla, with minor redesigns. It offers a claimed boot space of 487 L (17.2 cu ft) if equipped with a puncture repair kit, and 440 L (16 cu ft) with a temporary spare tyre.

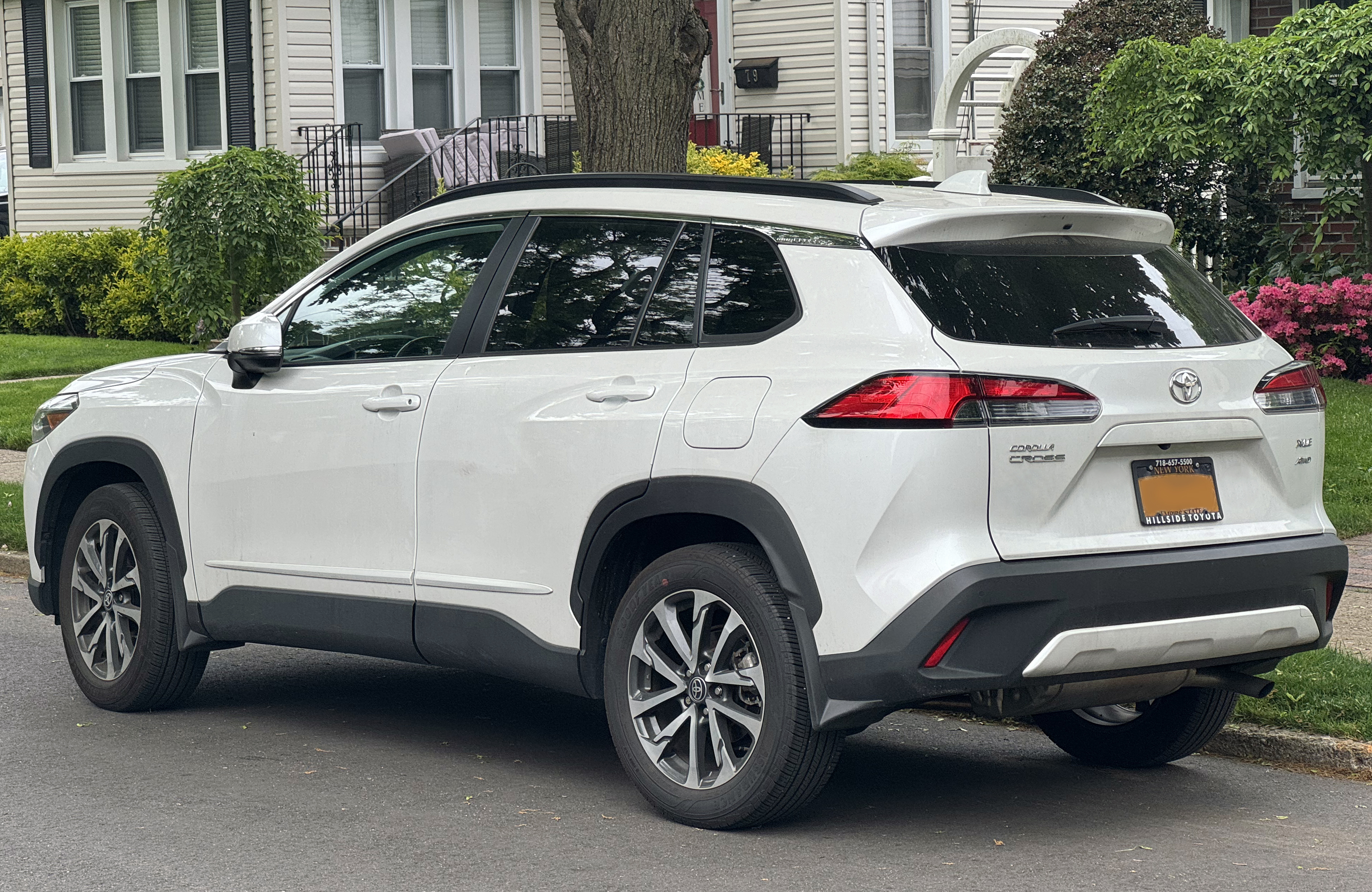
Rear view

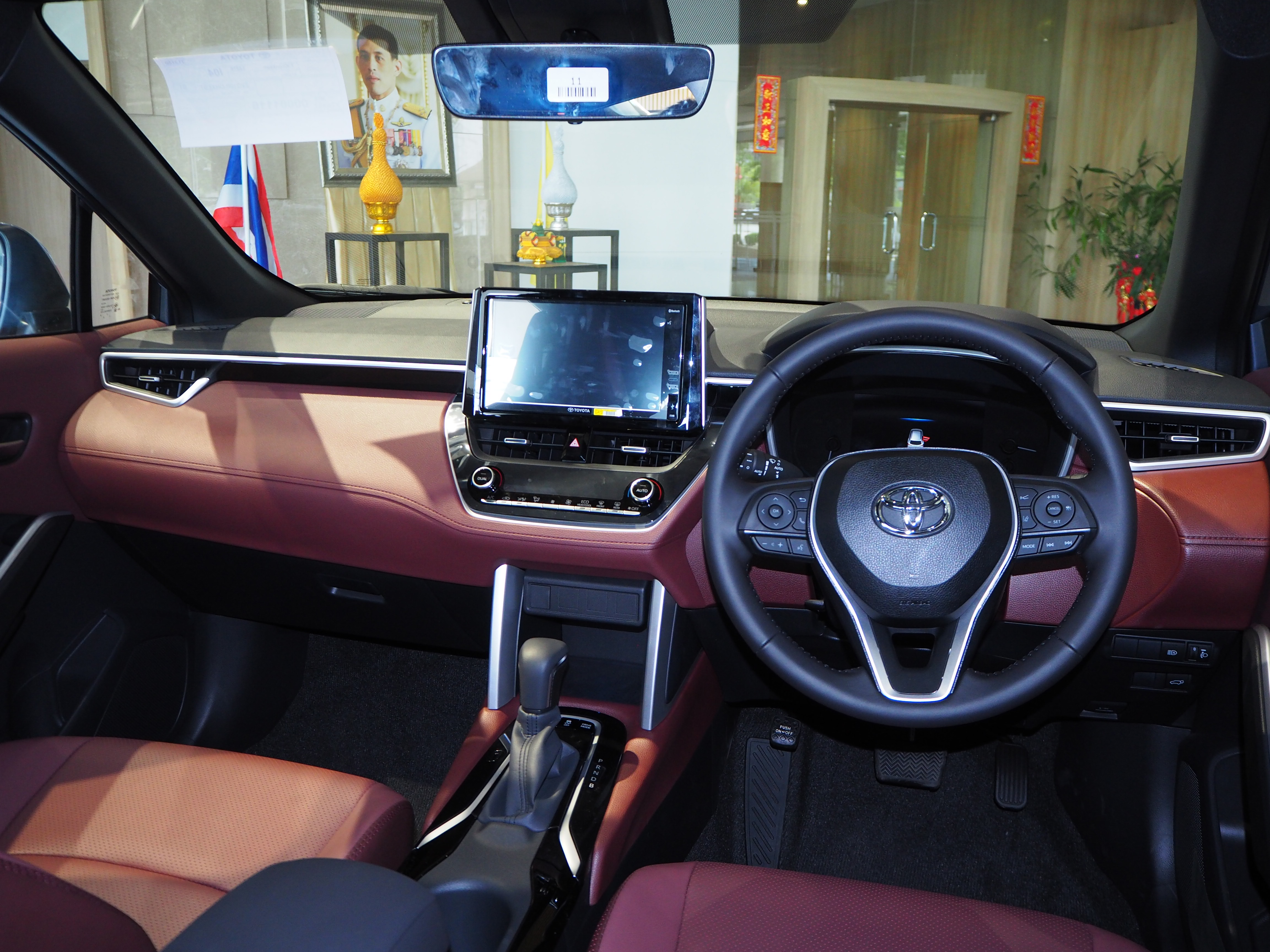
Interior

=== Facelift ===
The facelifted Corolla Cross was first introduced in Japan on 18 October 2023, where the 1.8-litre petrol engine was replaced by a 2.0-litre Dynamic Force engine and the 1.8-litre hybrid adopted new electric modules for improved fuel economy and output. The Japanese model also gained Proactive Driving Assist, an expanded Toyota Safety Sense system, a 10.5-inch display audio system and a fully digital 12.3-inch instrument panel on the top Z grade.

In Southeast Asia, the most noticeable features of the facelift are the redesigned front bumper with a body-coloured honeycomb grille, and the electronic parking brake that replaced the foot-operated mechanical parking brake. The GR Sport model received a different front bumper with a body-coloured panel between the headlights, a black grille and a restyled silver airdam.

The European facelift, revealed in May 2025, added new headlights and tail lights, an upgraded interior and a GR Sport trim, while the hybrid powertrains were renamed Hybrid 140 and Hybrid 200, and the all-wheel-drive AWD-i version gained a Snow Extra mode. The North American model was updated for the 2026 model year with separate front fascias for the hybrid and petrol models, with the hybrid receiving a body-coloured grille and the petrol model a more rugged design with larger openings. Both versions gained a 10.5-inch infotainment display and a redesigned centre console.

== Production ==
As of November 2026, the Corolla Cross is produced or assembled in Japan, Thailand, Taiwan, Brazil, the United States, Malaysia, China, South Africa and Pakistan. In Japan, production moved from the Takaoka plant to Toyota Motor East Japan's Iwate plant in April 2025.

== Powertrain ==
Petrol models use either a 1.8-litre 2ZR-FE/2ZR-FAE four-cylinder engine, or the 2ZR-FBE flex-fuel version in Thailand, producing 103 kW (138 hp; 140 PS) and paired with a continuously variable transmission (CVT). The other petrol option is a 2.0-litre M20A-FKS Dynamic Force engine producing 125–126 kW (168–169 hp; 170–171 PS), or the M20A-FKB flex-fuel version in Brazil producing up to 130 kW (174 hp; 177 PS), with torque ranging from 202 to 210 N⋅m (149 to 155 lb⋅ft) depending on the market and paired with a Direct Shift-CVT that uses a physical launch gear. In Japan, the 2.0-litre engine replaced the 1.8-litre unit in October 2023.

Hybrid models initially used a 1.8-litre 2ZR-FXE Atkinson cycle engine producing 72 kW (97 hp; 98 PS), paired with a 53 kW (71 hp; 72 PS) front motor for a total system output of 90 kW (121 hp; 122 PS); the Brazilian version is flex-fuel and produces 74 kW (99 hp; 101 PS) on ethanol. In October 2023, the Japanese-market 1.8-litre hybrid adopted Toyota's fifth-generation hybrid system with a 70 kW (94 hp; 95 PS) front motor and a lithium-ion battery, raising the total system output to 103 kW (138 hp; 140 PS), and the same output is offered in Europe as the Hybrid 140.

The 2.0-litre M20A-FXS hybrid, offered in markets such as Europe, North America and Australia, combines a 112 kW (150 hp; 152 PS) engine with an 83 kW (111 hp; 113 PS) front motor for a total system output of 146 kW (196 hp; 199 PS), and it is sold as the Hybrid 200 in Europe. In North America, the hybrid is offered only with all-wheel drive, while the petrol model is available with front-wheel or all-wheel drive. All-wheel-drive E-Four versions add a rear motor rated at 5.3 kW (7.1 hp; 7.2 PS) on the original 1.8-litre hybrid, and at 30 kW (40 hp; 41 PS) on the fifth-generation 1.8-litre and the 2.0-litre hybrids.

Engine					Electric motor	Total system output	Transmission	Battery	Model code	Layout	Cal. years
Type	Code	Displ.	Power	Torque	Electric motor	Total system output	Transmission	Battery	Model code	Layout	Cal. years
Petrol	2ZR-FE	1,798 cc (1.8 L) I4	103 kW (138 hp; 140 PS) @ 6,400 rpm	172 N⋅m (17.5 kg⋅m; 127 lb⋅ft) @ 4,000 rpm	–	–	K313 "Super CVT-i" with 7-speed simulation	–	ZSG10	FWD	2020–present
Petrol	2ZR-FAE	1,798 cc (1.8 L) I4	103 kW (138 hp; 140 PS) @ 6,200 rpm	170 N⋅m (17.3 kg⋅m; 125 lb⋅ft) @ 3,900 rpm	–	–	K313 "Super CVT-i" with 7-speed simulation	–	ZSG10	FWD	2021–2023 (Japan)
Petrol flex-fuel	2ZR-FBE	1,798 cc (1.8 L) I4	103 kW (138 hp; 140 PS) @ 6,000 rpm	177 N⋅m (18.0 kg⋅m; 131 lb⋅ft) @ 4,000 rpm	–	–	K313 "Super CVT-i" with 7-speed simulation	–	ZSG10	FWD	2020–2024 (Thailand)
Petrol	M20A-FKS	1,986 cc (2.0 L) I4	125–126 kW (168–169 hp; 170–171 PS) @ 6,600 rpm	205 N⋅m (20.9 kg⋅m; 151 lb⋅ft) @ 4,400 rpm 202 N⋅m (20.6 kg⋅m; 149 lb⋅ft) @ 4,400–4,900 rpm (Australia, Japan)	–	–	K120 Direct Shift-CVT	–	MXGA10	FWD	2021–present 2023–present (Japan)
Petrol	M20A-FKS	1,986 cc (2.0 L) I4	125–126 kW (168–169 hp; 170–171 PS) @ 6,600 rpm	205 N⋅m (20.9 kg⋅m; 151 lb⋅ft) @ 4,400 rpm 202 N⋅m (20.6 kg⋅m; 149 lb⋅ft) @ 4,400–4,900 rpm (Australia, Japan)	–	–	K120 Direct Shift-CVT	–	MXGA15	AWD	2021–present
Petrol flex-fuel	M20A-FKB	1,986 cc (2.0 L) I4	129–130 kW (173–174 hp; 175–177 PS) @ 6,600 rpm	209–210 N⋅m (21.3–21.4 kg⋅m; 154–155 lb⋅ft) @ 4,400 rpm	–	–	K120 Direct Shift-CVT	–	MXGA10	FWD	2021–present (Brazil)
Petrol	M20C-FKS	1,986 cc (2.0 L) I4	126 kW (169 hp; 171 PS) @ 6,600 rpm	203 N⋅m (20.7 kg⋅m; 150 lb⋅ft) @ 4,400–4,800 rpm	–	–	K120 Direct Shift-CVT	–	MXGA10	FWD	2021–present (Frontlander)
Petrol	M20D-FKS	1,986 cc (2.0 L) I4	126 kW (169 hp; 171 PS) @ 6,600 rpm	203 N⋅m (20.7 kg⋅m; 150 lb⋅ft) @ 4,400–4,800 rpm	–	–	K120 Direct Shift-CVT	–	MXGA10	FWD	2021–present (China)
Petrol hybrid	2ZR-FXE	1,798 cc (1.8 L) I4	72 kW (97 hp; 98 PS) @ 5,200 rpm	142 N⋅m (14.5 kg⋅m; 105 lb⋅ft) @ 3,600 rpm	53 kW (71 hp; 72 PS), 163 N⋅m (120 lb⋅ft) (1NM, front)	90 kW (121 hp; 122 PS)	eCVT	6.5 Ah NiMH or lithium-ion	ZVG10/11/13	FWD	2020–present
Petrol hybrid	2ZR-FXE	1,798 cc (1.8 L) I4	72 kW (97 hp; 98 PS) @ 5,200 rpm	142 N⋅m (14.5 kg⋅m; 105 lb⋅ft) @ 3,600 rpm	53 kW (71 hp; 72 PS), 163 N⋅m (120 lb⋅ft) (1NM, front); 5.3 kW (7.1 hp; 7.2 PS), 55 N⋅m (41 lb⋅ft) (1MM induction, rear)	90 kW (121 hp; 122 PS)	eCVT	6.5 Ah NiMH	ZVG15/16	AWD	2021–2023 (Japan)
Petrol hybrid	2ZR-FXE	1,798 cc (1.8 L) I4	72 kW (97 hp; 98 PS) @ 5,200 rpm	142 N⋅m (14.5 kg⋅m; 105 lb⋅ft) @ 3,600 rpm	70 kW (94 hp; 95 PS), 185 N⋅m (136 lb⋅ft) (front)	103 kW (138 hp; 140 PS)	eCVT	Lithium-ion	ZVG11	FWD	2023–present (Japan, Europe)
Petrol hybrid	2ZR-FXE	1,798 cc (1.8 L) I4	72 kW (97 hp; 98 PS) @ 5,200 rpm	142 N⋅m (14.5 kg⋅m; 105 lb⋅ft) @ 3,600 rpm	70 kW (94 hp; 95 PS), 185 N⋅m (136 lb⋅ft) (front); 30 kW (40 hp; 41 PS), 84 N⋅m (62 lb⋅ft) (rear)	103 kW (138 hp; 140 PS)	eCVT	Lithium-ion	ZVG15	AWD	2023–present (Japan, Europe)
Petrol flex-fuel hybrid	2ZR-FXE	1,798 cc (1.8 L) I4	74 kW (99 hp; 101 PS) (ethanol)	142 N⋅m (14.5 kg⋅m; 105 lb⋅ft)	Two motor-generators	90 kW (121 hp; 122 PS)	eCVT	–	–	FWD	2021–present (Brazil)
Petrol hybrid	M20A-FXS	1,987 cc (2.0 L) I4	112 kW (150 hp; 152 PS) @ 6,000 rpm	188 N⋅m (19.2 kg⋅m; 139 lb⋅ft) @ 4,400 rpm	83 kW (111 hp; 113 PS), 206 N⋅m (152 lb⋅ft) (5NM, front)	146 kW (196 hp; 199 PS)	eCVT	Lithium-ion	MXGH10	FWD	2022–present
Petrol hybrid	M20A-FXS	1,987 cc (2.0 L) I4	112 kW (150 hp; 152 PS) @ 6,000 rpm	188 N⋅m (19.2 kg⋅m; 139 lb⋅ft) @ 4,400 rpm	83 kW (111 hp; 113 PS), 206 N⋅m (152 lb⋅ft) (5NM, front); 30 kW (40 hp; 41 PS), 84 N⋅m (62 lb⋅ft) (4NM, rear)	146 kW (196 hp; 199 PS)	eCVT	Lithium-ion	MXGH15	AWD	2022–present

== Markets ==
=== Africa ===
==== Kenya ====
The Corolla Cross was launched in Kenya on 18 November 2020 and is only offered with a 1.8-litre 2ZR-FE petrol engine in Limited and Executive trim levels.

==== South Africa ====
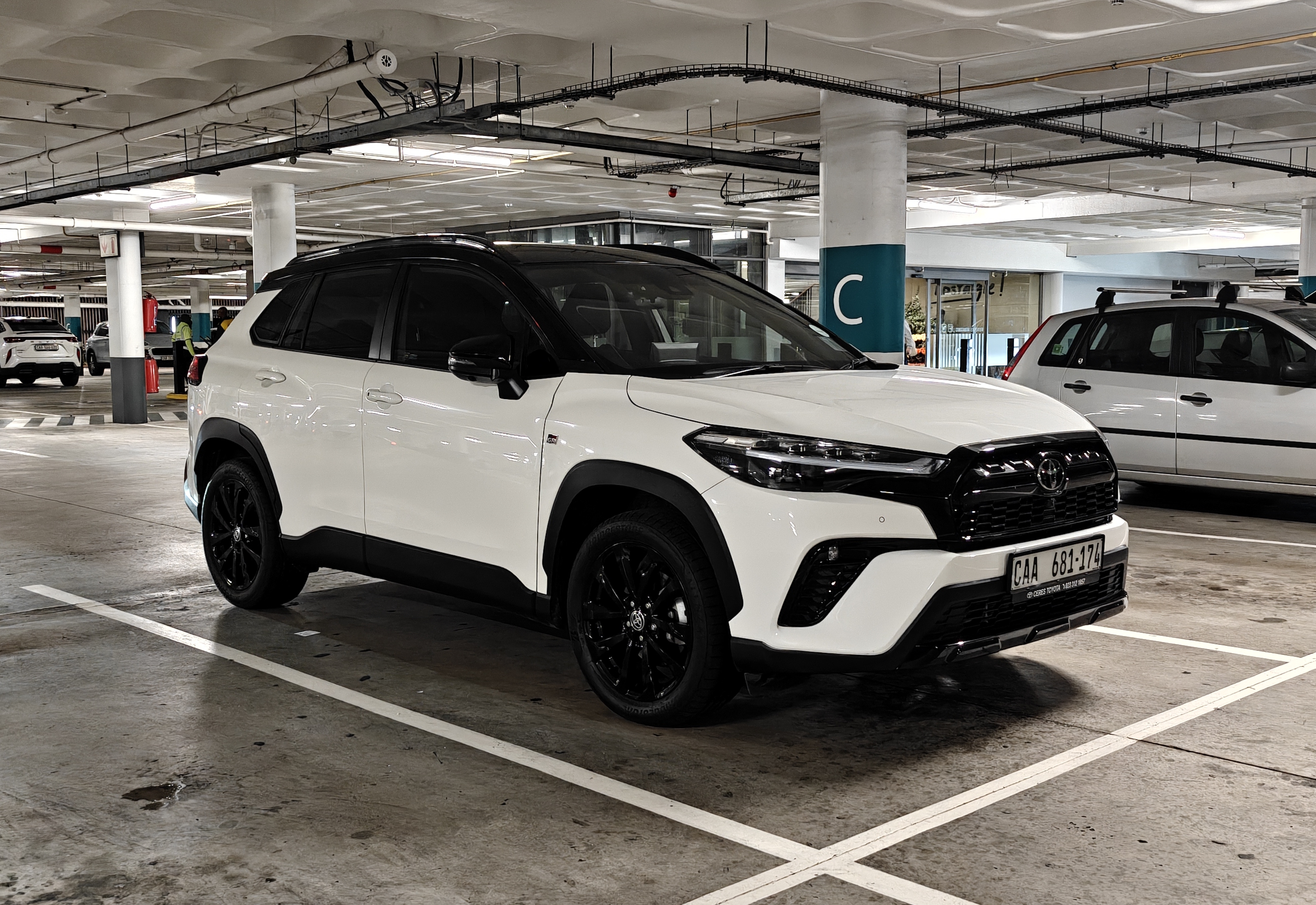
Corolla Cross GR Sport (South Africa)

The Corolla Cross went on sale in South Africa in November 2021, available in Xi, XS, and XR trim levels. Produced locally at the Toyota South Africa Motors plant, it is powered by either a 1.8-litre 2ZR-FE petrol or a 1.8-litre 2ZR-FXE hybrid petrol engines. Four styling packages were offered: X-Over, Urban Sport, Adventure, and Hybrid.

The facelifted Corolla Cross was launched in South Africa on 13 January 2025, with four trim levels: Xi, XS, XR, and GR Sport. All trims received styling changes of the facelift model except for the GR Sport at the time of its launch, with the facelifted GR Sport model later followed in February 2026.

The Corolla Cross was the best-selling passenger vehicle in South Africa in December 2025, and has consistently ranked in the top 10 best-sellers list.

=== Americas ===
==== Argentina ====
The Corolla Cross was launched in Argentina on 12 March 2021. It is imported from Brazil and available in both petrol and hybrid versions.

- Petrol Engine: 2.0 L M20A-FKS engine in XLI, XEI and GR-S trim levels.
- Hybrid Engine: 1.8 L 2ZR-FXE hybrid engine in XEI and SE-G trim levels.

The facelifted model debuted in Argentina in May 2024 with the same variants.

==== Brazil ====
The Corolla Cross was revealed in Brazil on 12 March 2021. Locally manufactured at the Sorocaba plant, it is powered by either a direct-injected 2.0-litre M20A-FKB flex fuel petrol engine for XR and XRE trim levels, or a 1.8-litre 2ZR-FXE hybrid flex fuel unit for XRV and XRX trim levels. Toyota targeted the hybrid version to contribute 30 percent of Corolla Cross total sales in the country. It is also exported to 22 countries in Latin America and the Caribbean.

The facelifted model debuted in Brazil in April 2024, with four trim levels: XR, XRE, XRX and GR Sport, with the same engine options from the pre-facelift model.

==== Colombia ====
The Corolla Cross was introduced to the Colombian market in May 2021. It is imported from Brazil and available in both petrol and hybrid versions.

- Petrol Engine: 2.0 L M20A-FKS engine in XLI (entry-level), XEI (mid-level) and GR-S (sport) trim levels.
- Hybrid Engine: 1.8 L 2ZR-FXE hybrid engine in XEI (mid-level), SE-G (high-level) trim levels.

The facelifted model (2025 Model Year) debuted in Colombia in May 2024 with the same variants.

==== Mexico ====
The Corolla Cross was launched in Mexico on 23 January 2023, available in LE and XLE trim levels, it is powered by a 2.0-litre M20A-FKS petrol engine. The Hybrid model powered by a 2.0-litre M20A-FXS hybrid petrol engine, based on the LE trim, was later added in July 2023.

The facelifted model was launched in Mexico on 11 September 2025 for the 2026 model year, with four variants: LE, XLE, Hybrid SE and Hybrid XSE.

==== North America ====
The Corolla Cross for the North American market was unveiled on 2 June 2021. The first vehicle to be built at the Mazda Toyota Manufacturing USA plant in Huntsville, Alabama, the production began on 30 September 2021. Initially only available with a 2.0-litre M20A-FKS petrol engine paired with the K120 "Direct Shift" CVT, it was offered in L, LE and XLE trim levels in the United States and Canada, and in LE trim in Mexico, with an all-wheel drive system available as an option in former two markets.

The hybrid model with standard all-wheel drive was unveiled on 1 June 2022 for the 2023 model year. Powered by a 2.0-litre M20A-FXS hybrid petrol engine, it is offered in S, SE, and XSE trim levels in the United States, and in SE and XSE trim levels in Canada. The S, SE, and XSE trim levels are newly introduced for the 2023 model year, which adopts the Japanese market Corolla Cross and the Chinese market Frontlander front fascia design and is equipped with a sport-tuned suspension.

The facelifted model was released in North America in May 2025 for the 2026 model year. In the US, the petrol models are available in L, LE and XLE trim levels all equipped with an all-wheel drive system, while the hybrid models are available in S, SE and XSE trim levels. In Canada, the petrol models are available in L, LE, LE Premium and XLE trim levels, while the Hybrid models are available in SE and XSE trim levels.

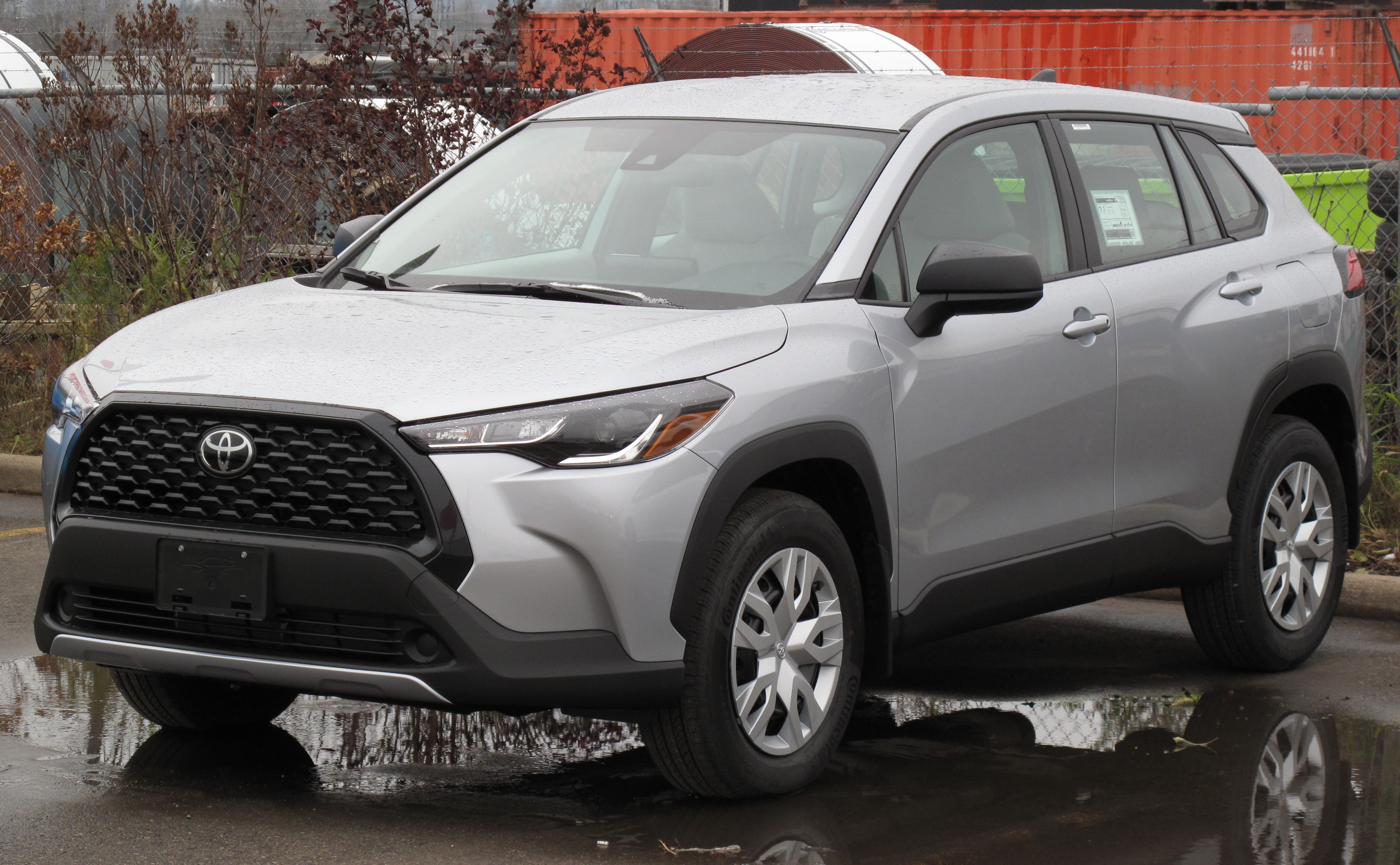
2022 Toyota Corolla Cross L FWD (MXGA10, US)

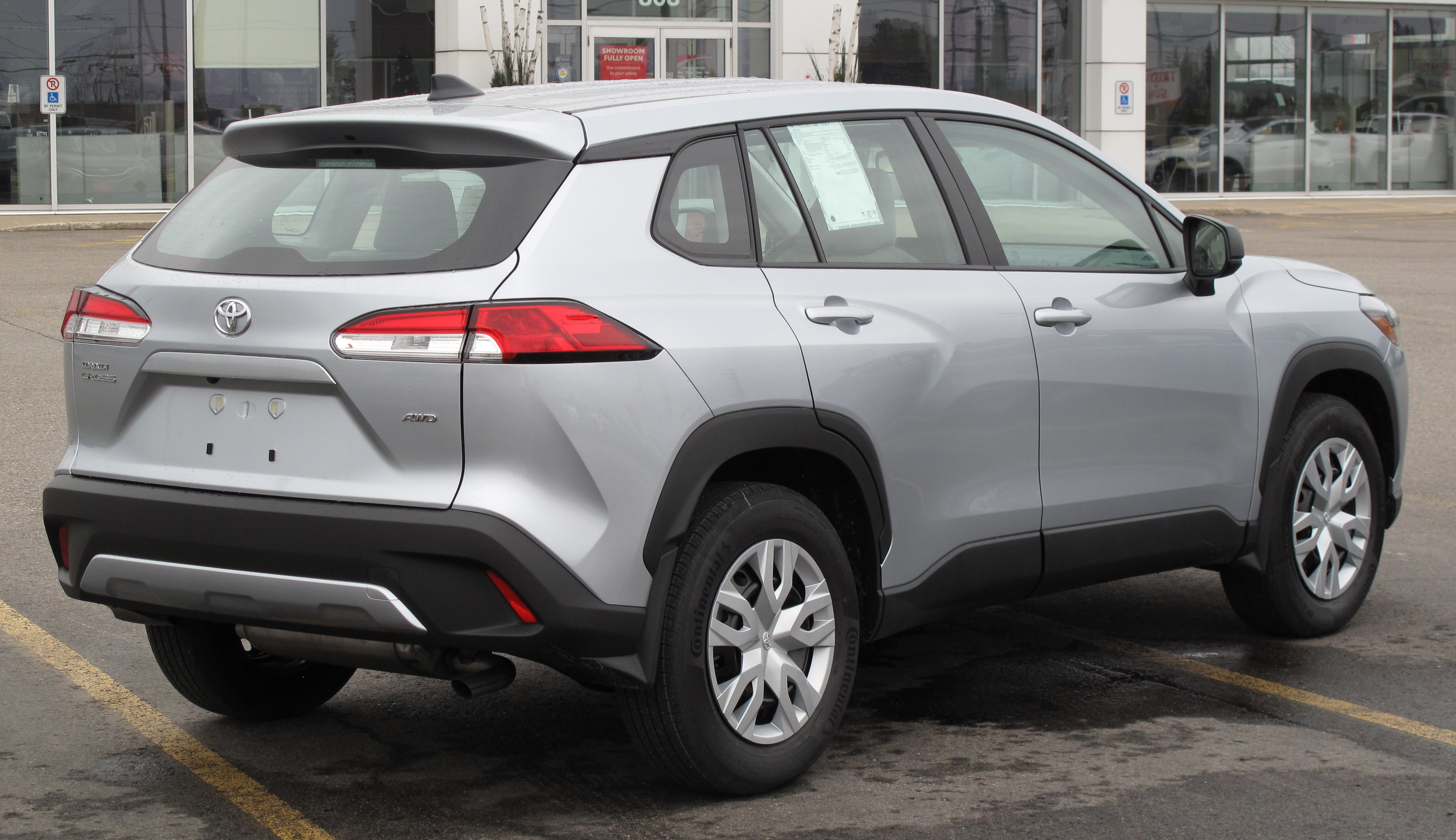
2022 Toyota Corolla Cross L AWD (MXGA15, US)

=== Asia ===
==== Bangladesh ====
The Toyota Corolla Cross was launched in Bangladesh on 8 January 2021.

==== Brunei ====
The Corolla Cross marketed as the Toyota Cross for the Bruneian market was launched on 21 August 2020. It is only offered with a 1.8-litre 2ZR-FE petrol engine in Standard or High trim levels. The 1.8-litre hybrid variant was introduced in October 2022.

The facelifted Corolla Cross dropped the Standard trim, leaving only the High and Hybrid trim levels.

==== China ====
The Corolla Cross for the Chinese market is produced and marketed by FAW Toyota. Its twin model is produced by GAC Toyota and marketed as the Frontlander (Chinese: 锋兰达; pinyin: Fēnglándá). Both the Corolla Cross and Frontlander was unveiled at the Guangzhou Auto Show in November 2021. The Frontlander adopts the Japanese model's front and rear styling. The Frontlander is powered with a 2.0-litre M20C-FKS engine, while the Corolla Cross is powered with a M20E-FKS unit. It is positioned as the entry-level SUV of Toyota in the market with a lower pricing compared to the C-HR/IZOA.

The facelifted Frontlander was launched in China on 23 September 2025.

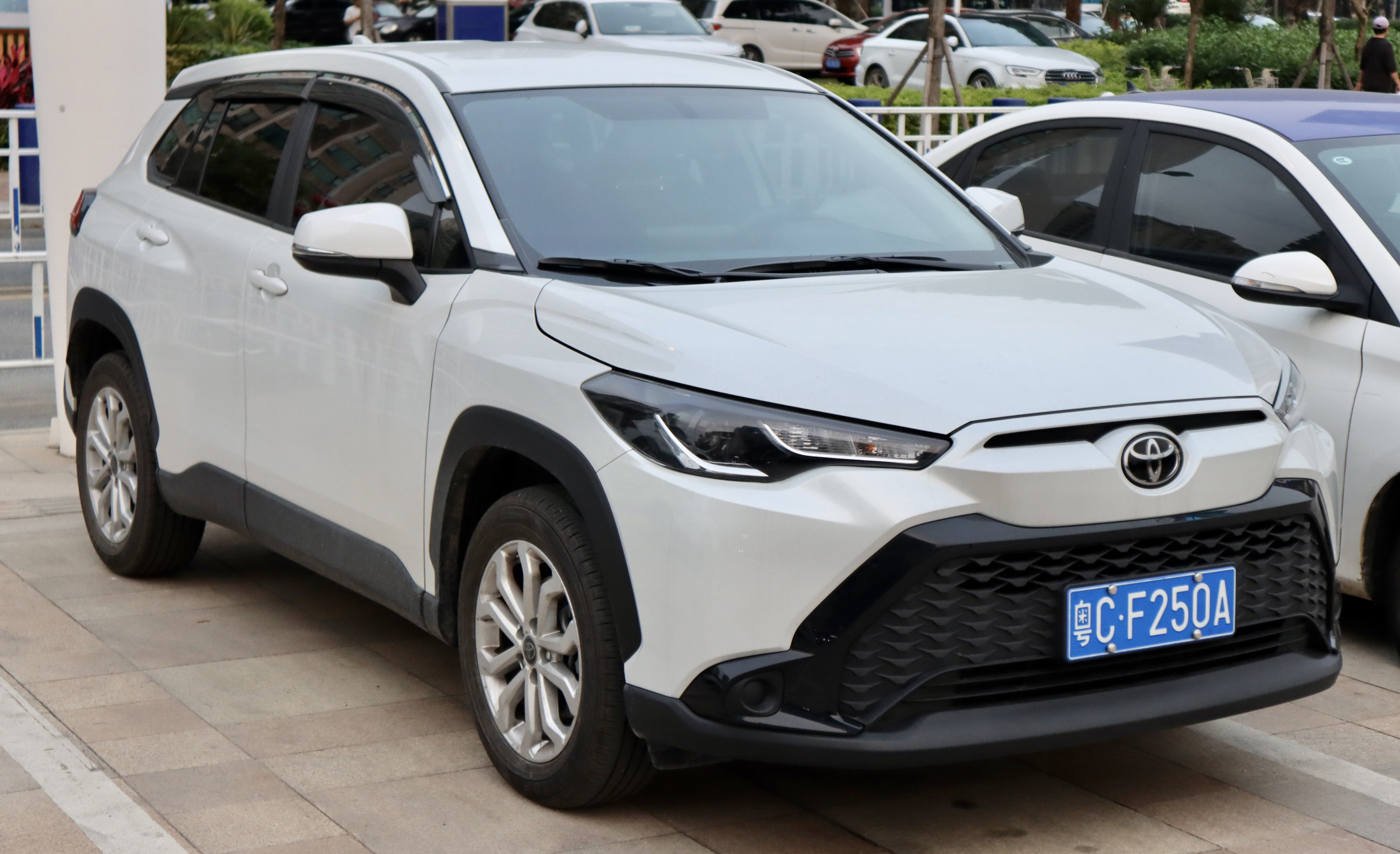
Toyota Frontlander (China, pre-facelift)

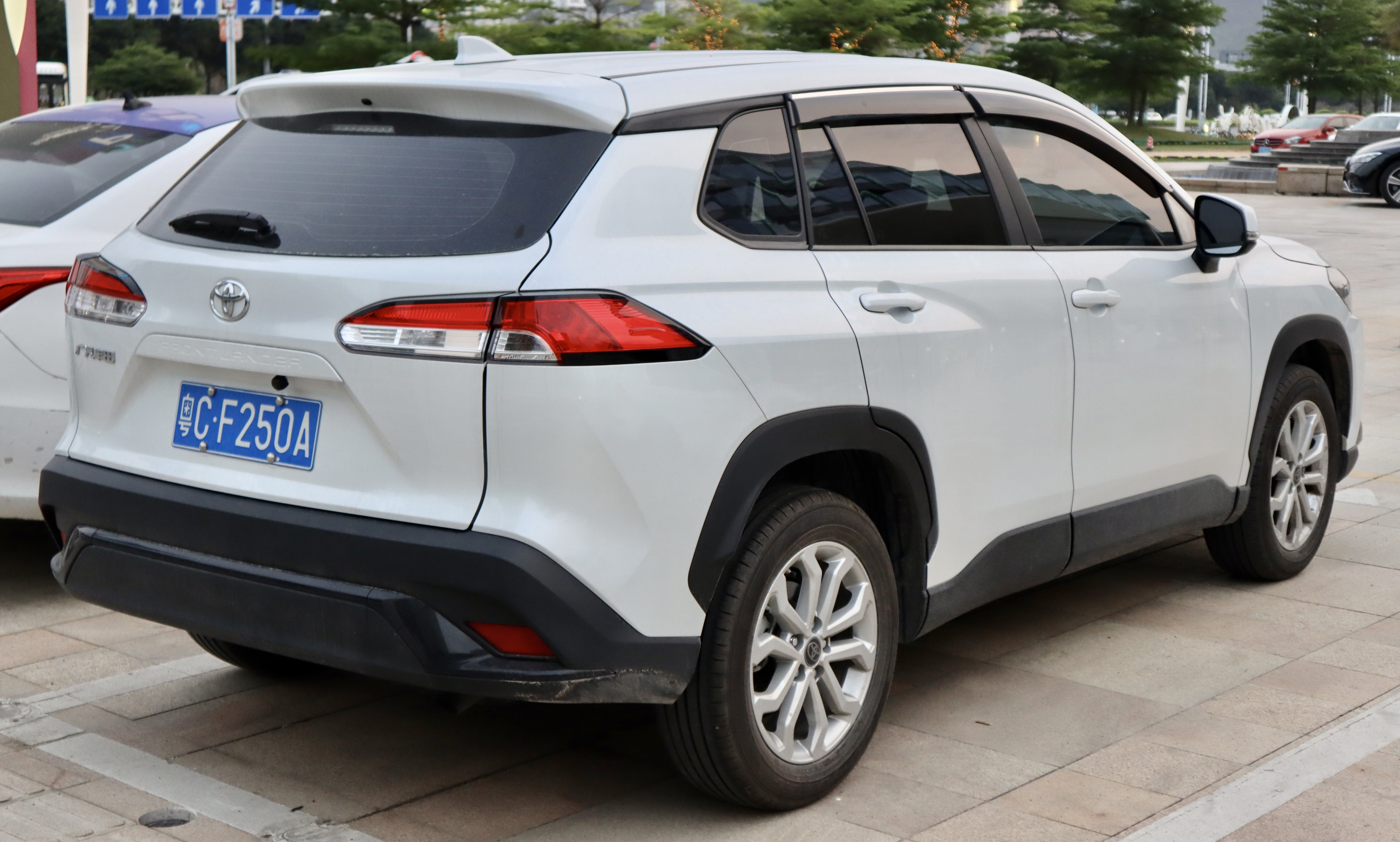
Toyota Frontlander (China, pre-facelift)

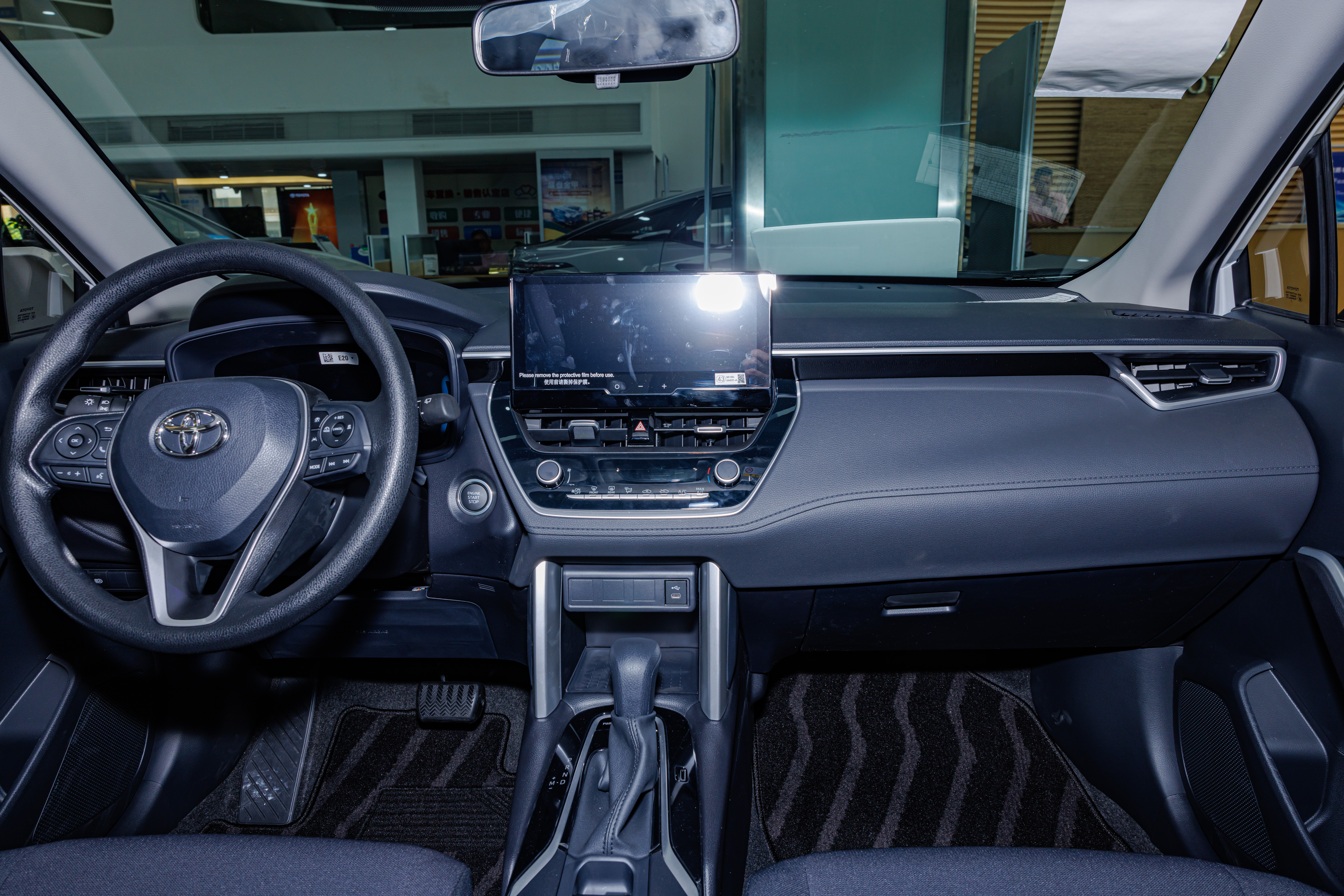
Toyota Frontlander (China) Interior

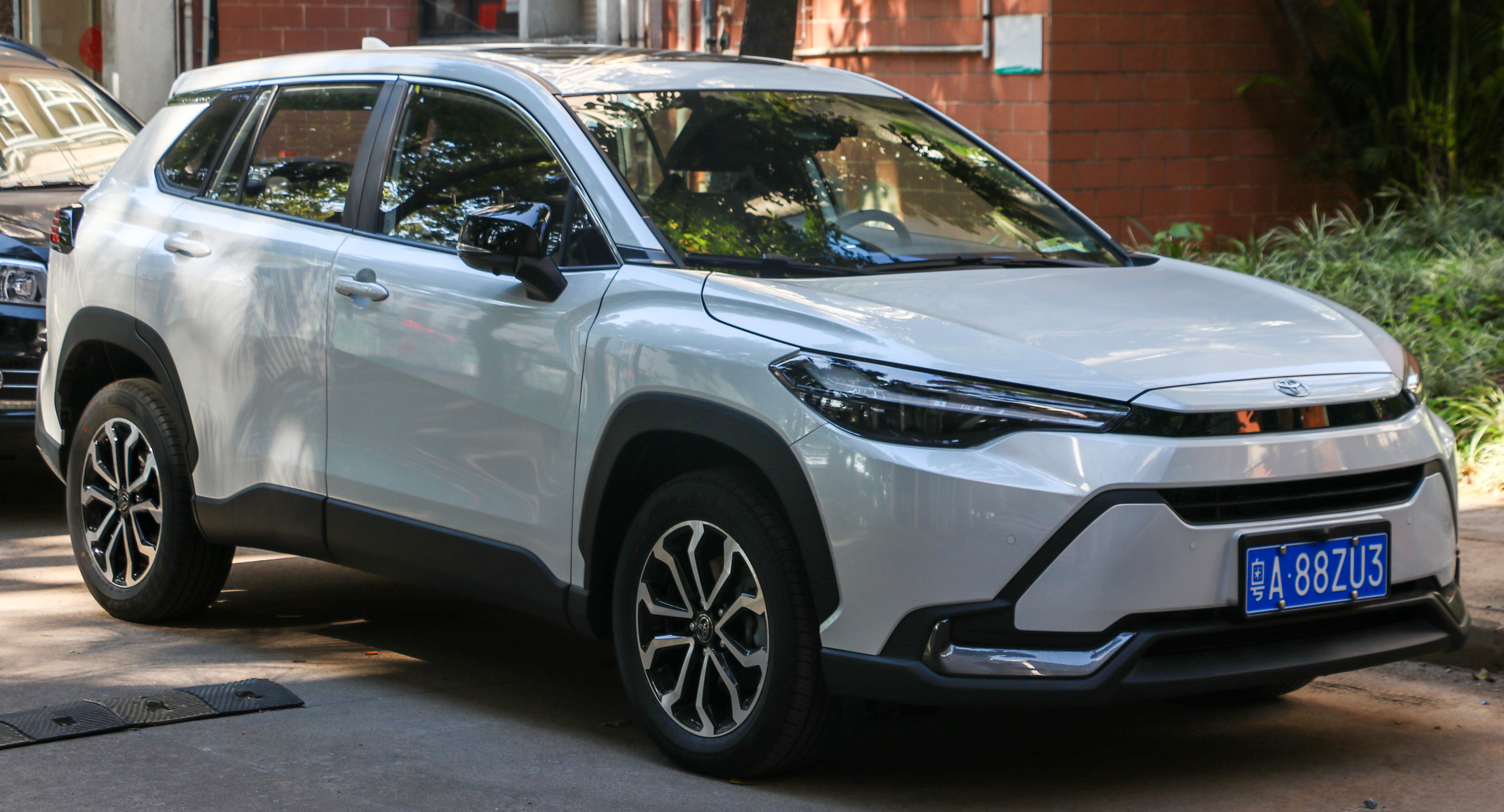
Toyota Frontlander (China, facelift)

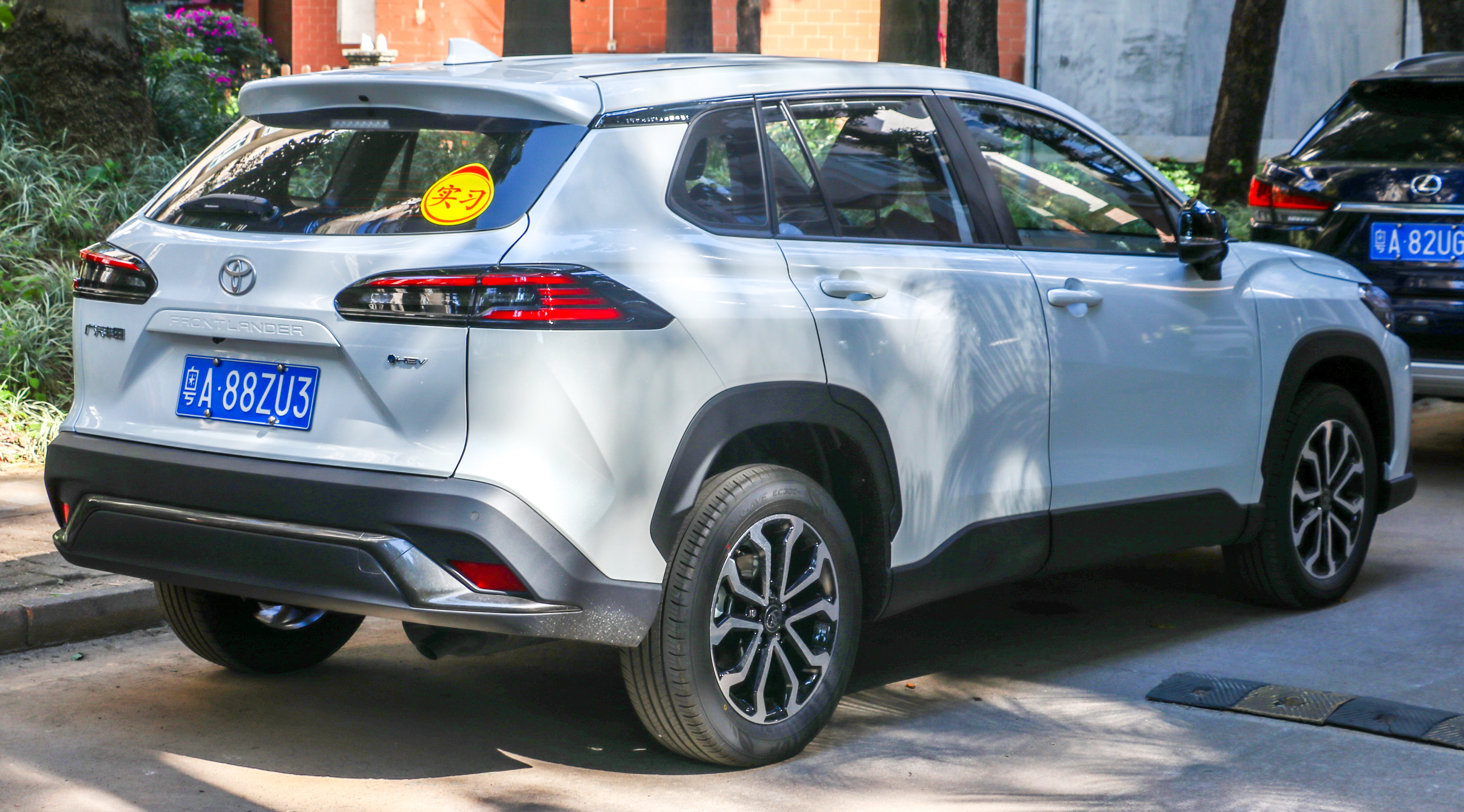
Toyota Frontlander (China, facelift)

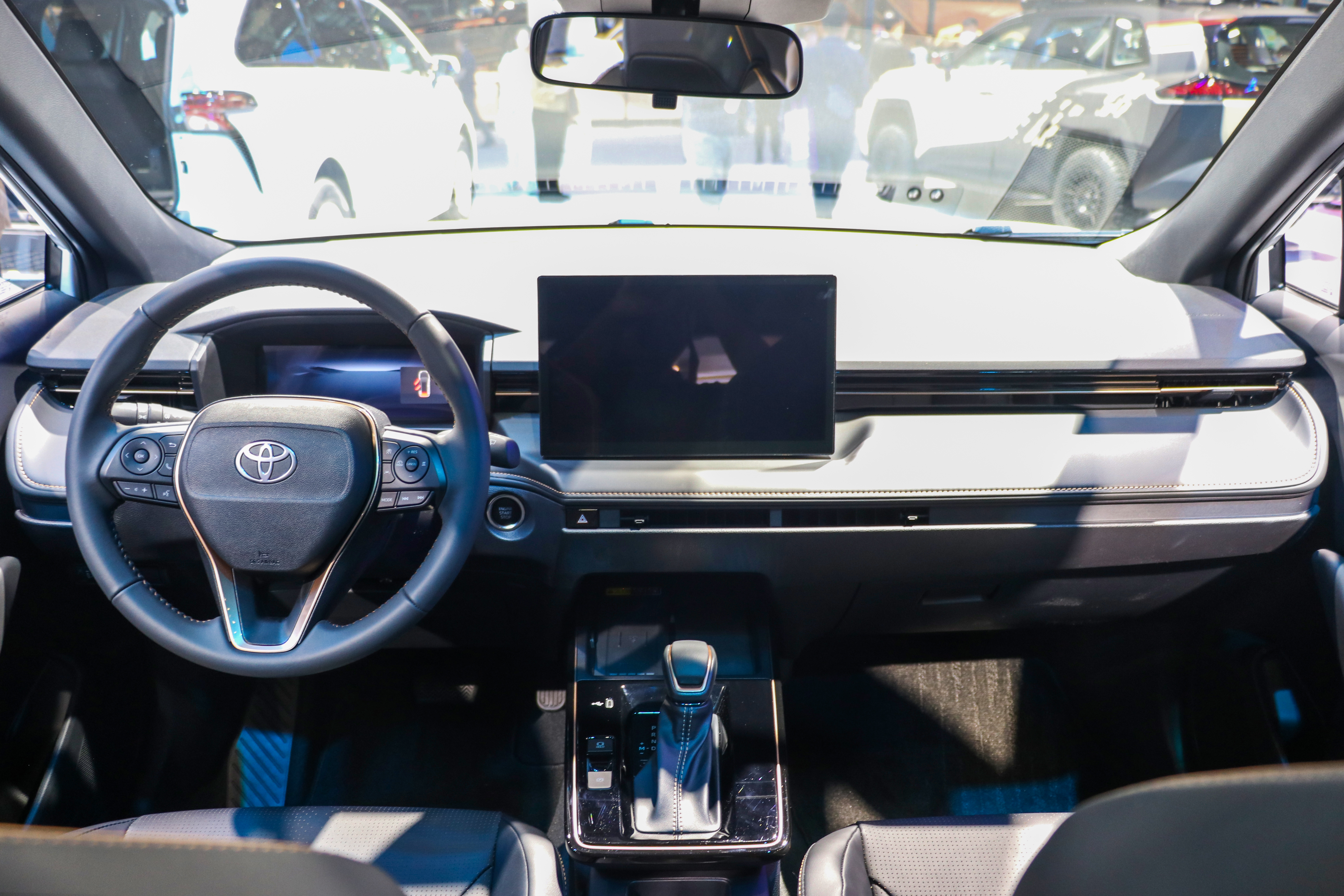
Toyota Frontlander Interior (China, facelift)

==== Indonesia ====
The Indonesian market Corolla Cross was launched on 6 August 2020 and is offered with petrol and hybrid models. Due to low sales, the conventional petrol model was no longer distributed to the dealers since August 2021. The hybrid GR Sport trim was introduced on 16 February 2023.

The facelifted model was launched on 13 February 2025, while the facelifted hybrid GR Sport trim followed later in May 2026.

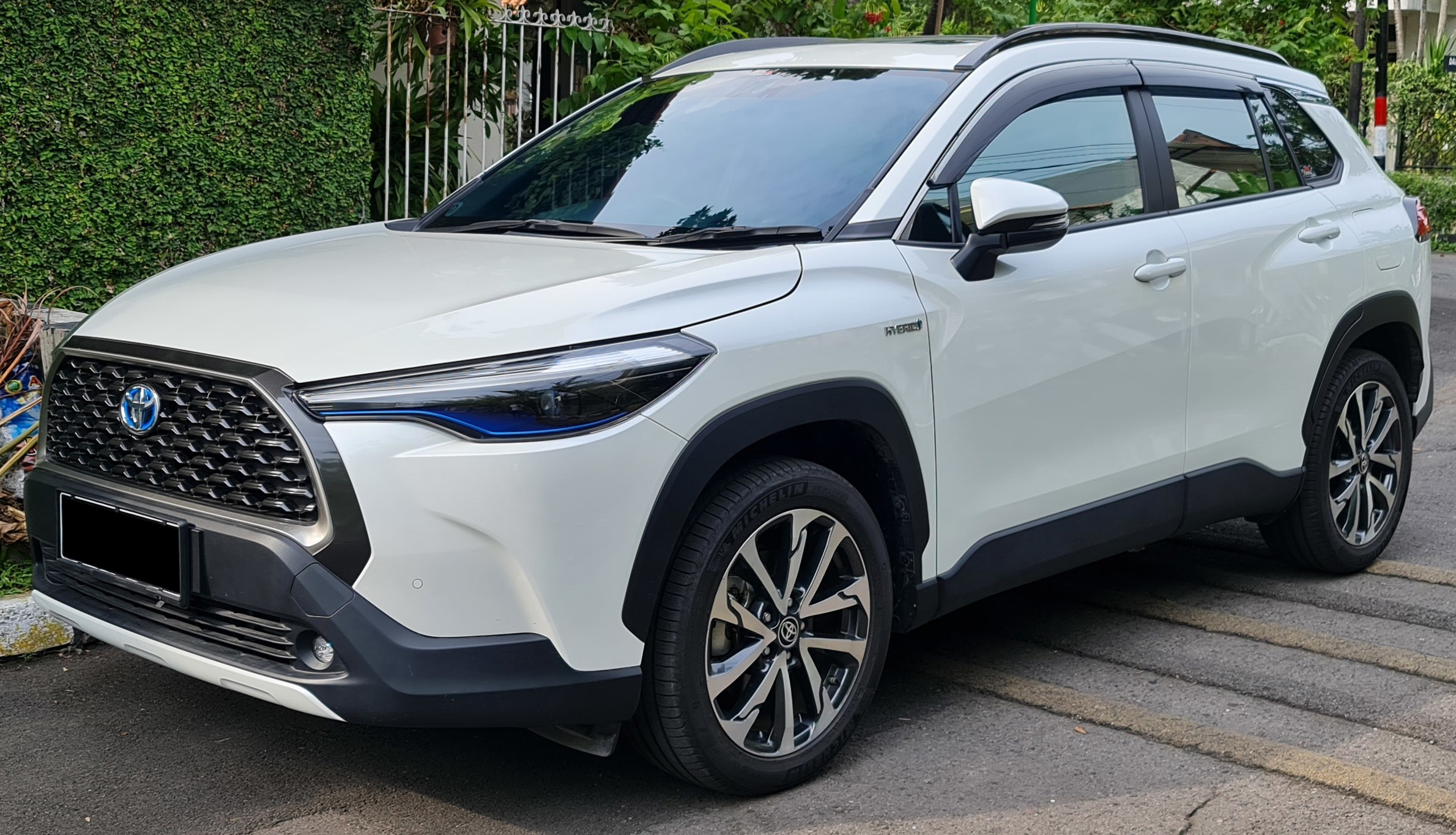
2020 Corolla Cross 1.8 Hybrid (ZVG10, Indonesia)

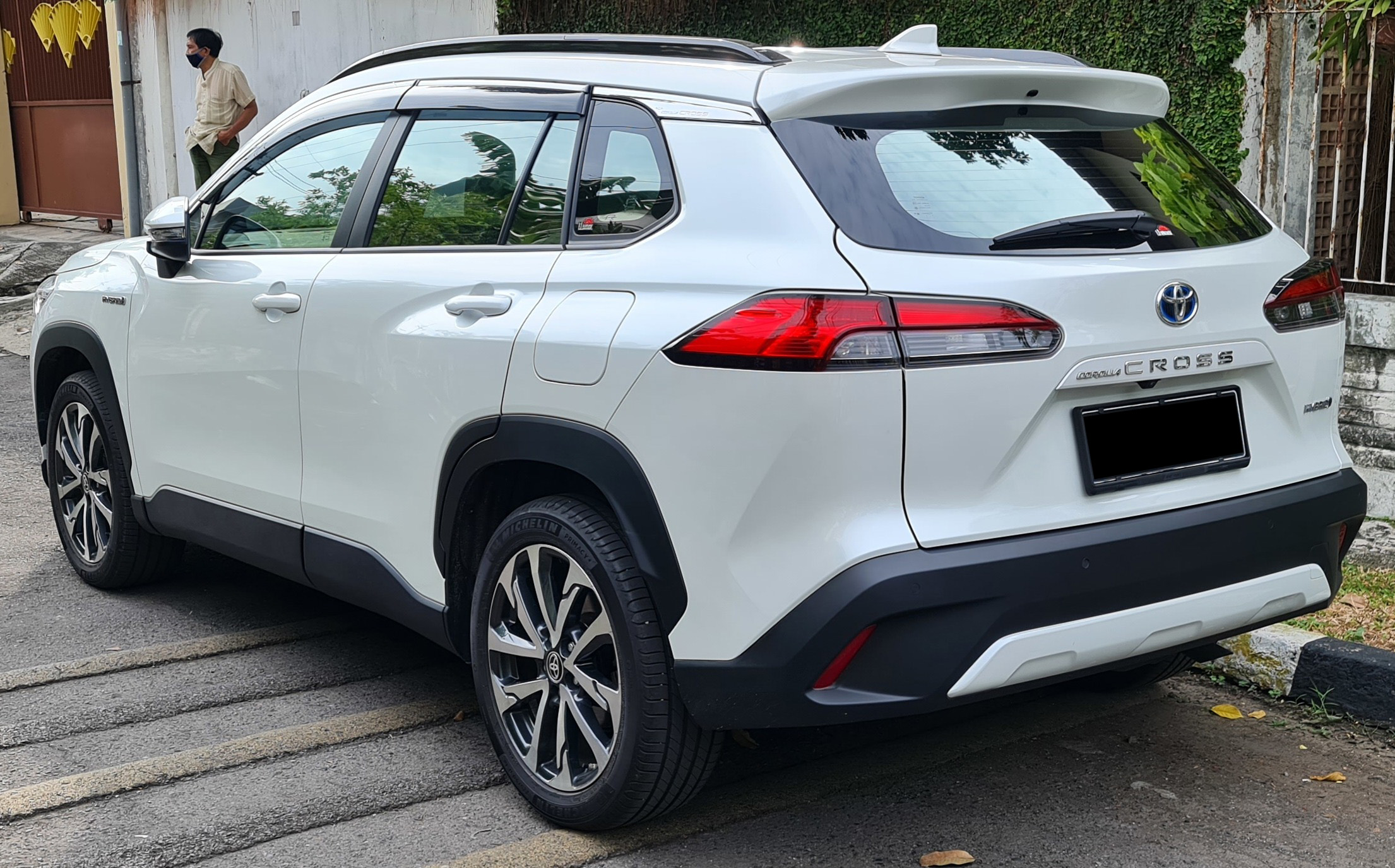
2020 Corolla Cross 1.8 Hybrid (ZVG10, Indonesia)

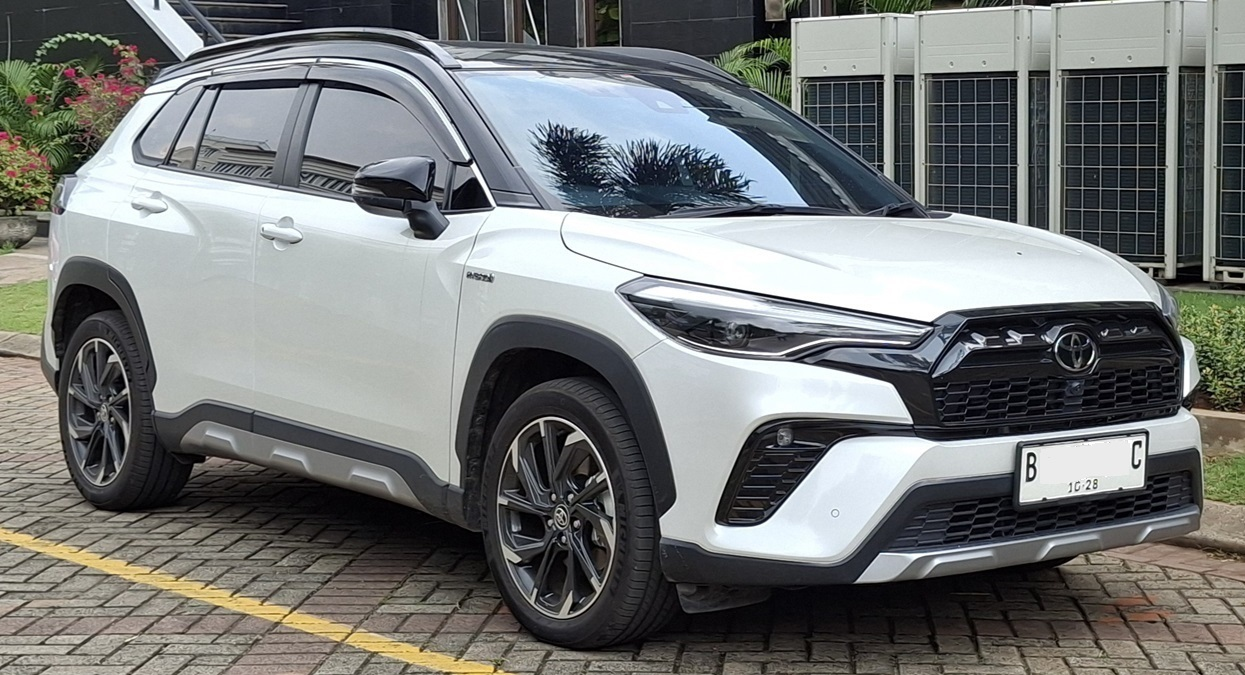
2023 Corolla Cross 1.8 Hybrid GR Sport (ZVG10, Indonesia)

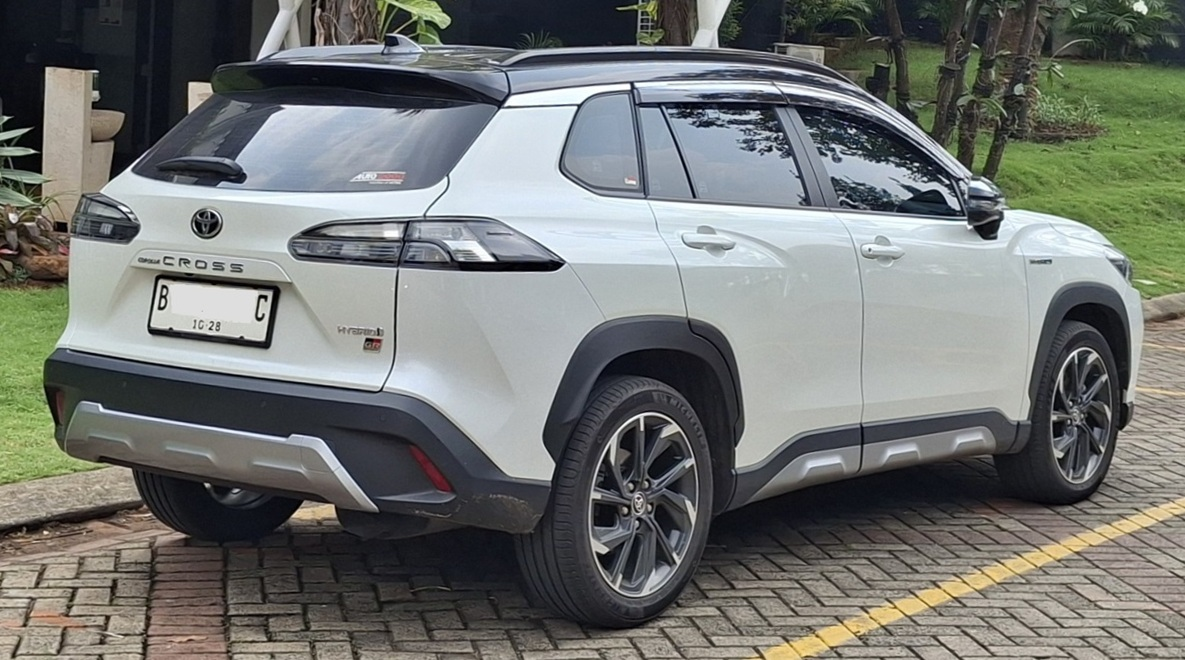
2023 Corolla Cross 1.8 Hybrid GR Sport (ZVG10, Indonesia)

==== Japan ====
The Japanese market Corolla Cross was unveiled on 14 September 2021, with a differentiated front fascia from the global model (later shared with the Chinese market Frontlander and the North American market Corolla Cross Hybrid S/SE/XSE), headlight and taillight clusters (later shared with the European model), and the dedicated Corolla "C" front logo. Trim levels available are G"X", G, S and Z, and is offered with an either 1.8-litre 2ZR-FAE petrol engines. "E-Four" all-wheel drive is optional for the latter. Independent multi-link rear suspension setup is standard for E-Four models, while a panoramic roof is available for higher trim levels.

In 2023, A 1.8-litre 2ZR-FXE hybrid was added on Z trim. All petrol variant has been upgraded to a 2.0L M20A-FKS engine that also achieves low fuel consumption and high output. The S petrol trim was dropped.

The facelifted Corolla Cross was launched in Japan on 23 May 2025, with an all-hybrid lineup. It is offered in three trim levels; the base G, mid-level S, luxury Z and GR Sport. All models are powered by hybrid engines. The 1.8-litre G, S, Z are paired with either front wheel drive or E-Four.

The GR Sport version was added in May 2025. Unlike ASEAN and Taiwan markets, the GR Corolla Cross adopting “MATRIX” grille, a design seen on other GR models. It also comes with a sleek upper grille that visually links the headlights, giving it a wider and lower stance. The 2.0-litre GR Sport is only offered with E-Four all-wheel drive.

The more rugged Z Adventure was added in July 2026 for commemorate the 60th Anniversary Corolla nameplate. Changes mainly around the front grille and bumpers, and it features a redesigned front grille with a black Coat finish, black painted grille mouldings, Metallic painted front and rear bumper lower garnishes, and black door window frame mouldings.

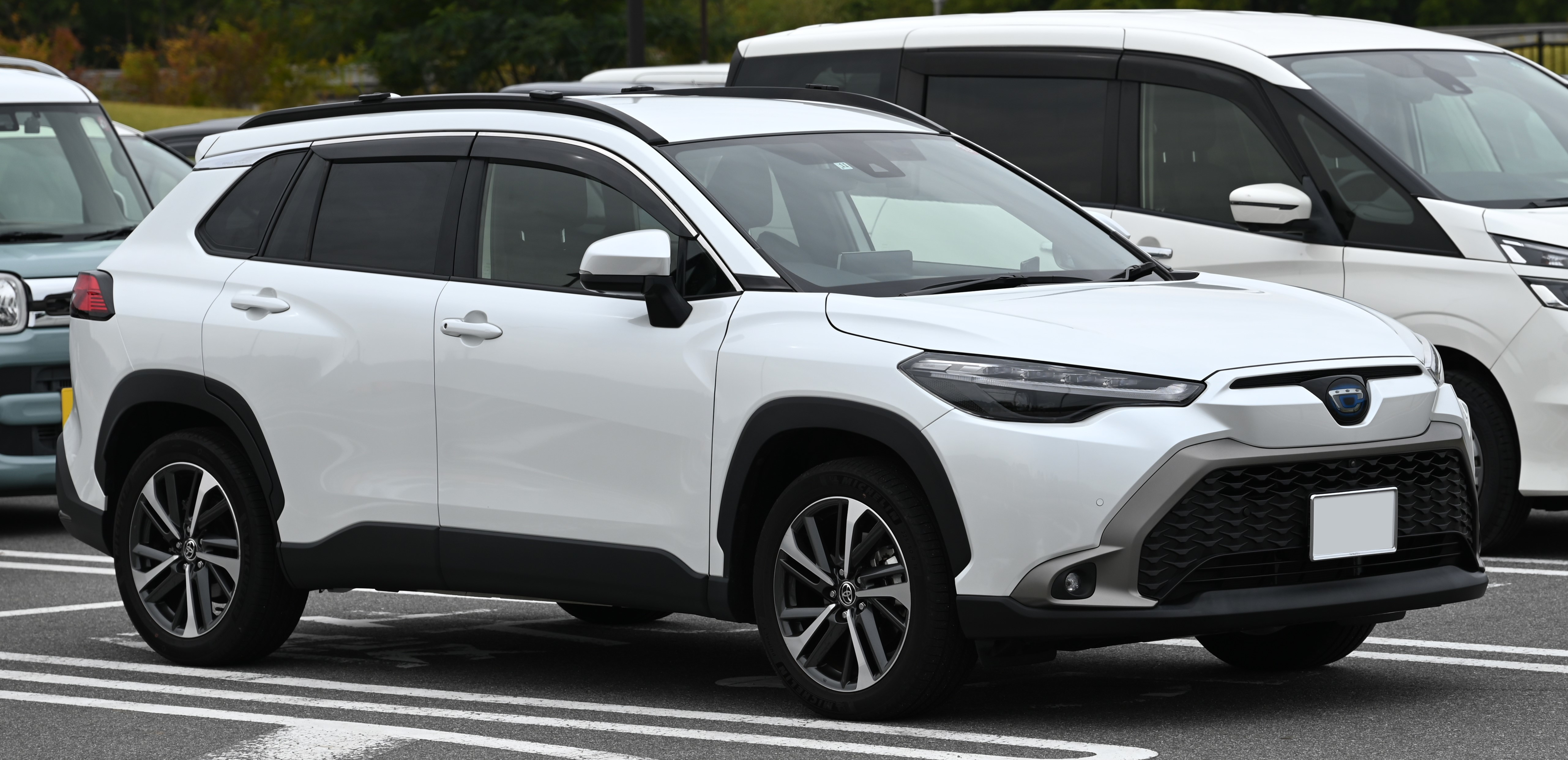
Pre-facelift Corolla Cross Hybrid Z (ZVG10, Japan)

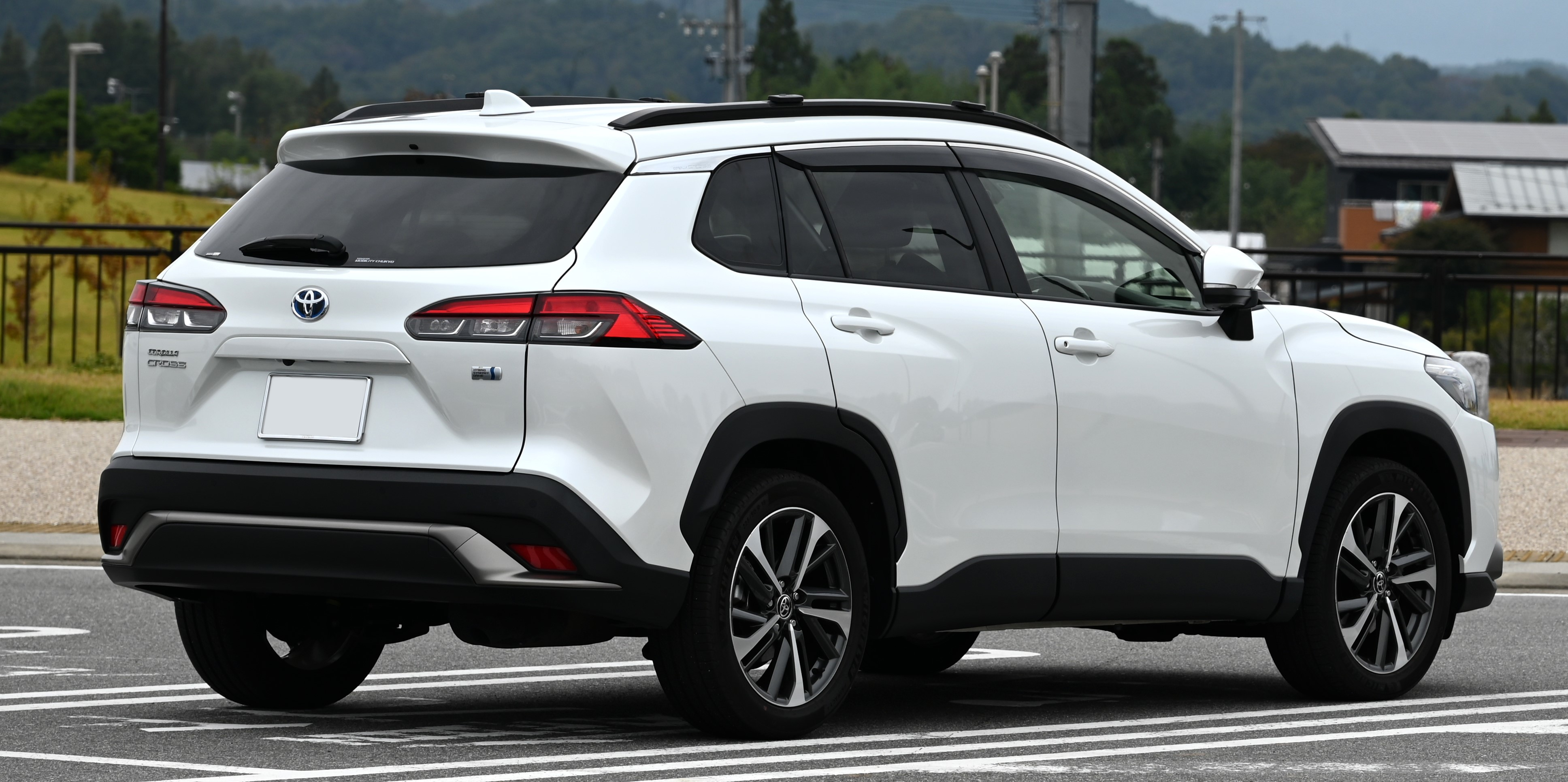
Pre-facelift Corolla Cross Hybrid Z (ZVG10, Japan)

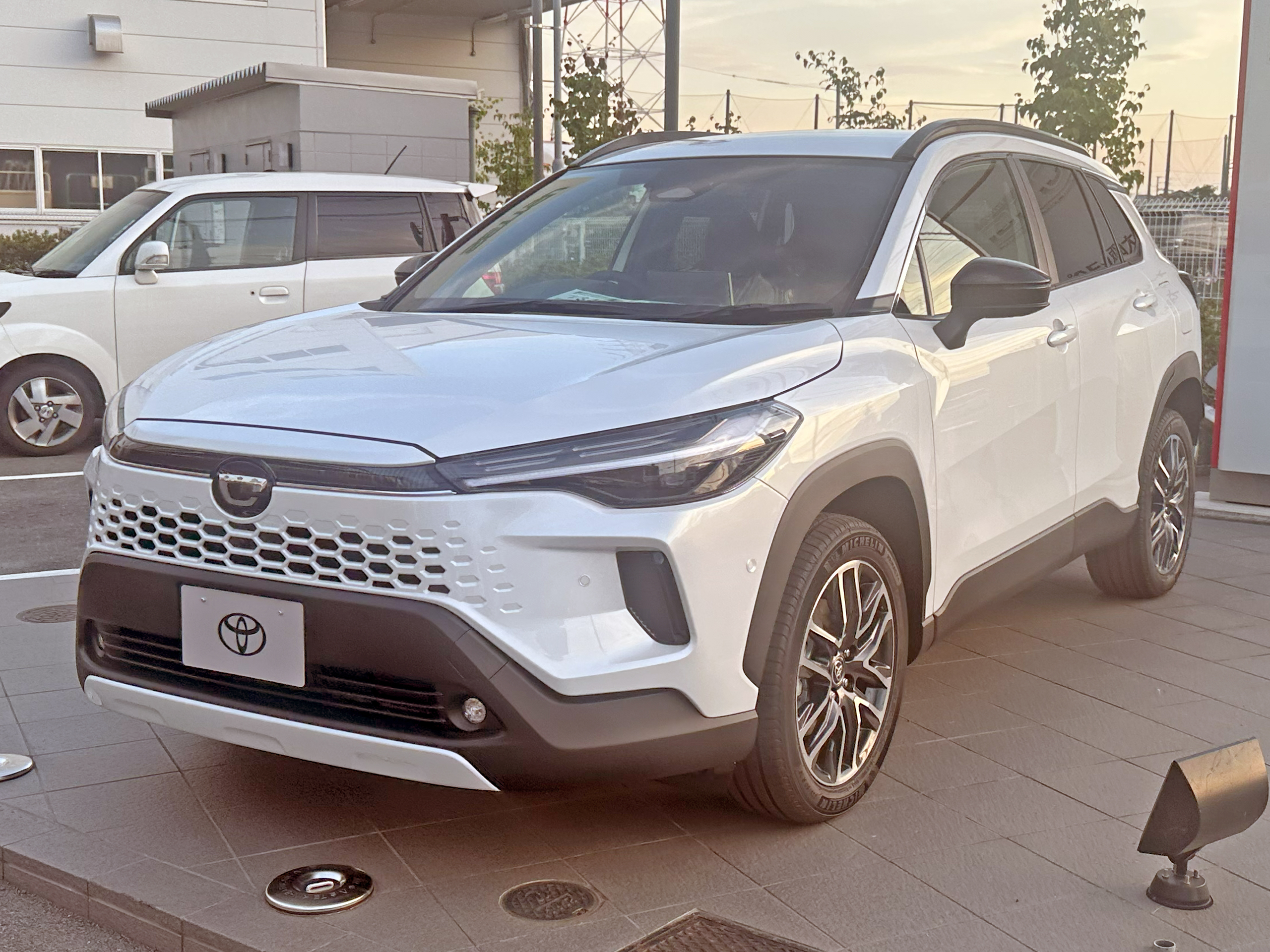
Facelift Corolla Cross Z 2WD (ZVG13)

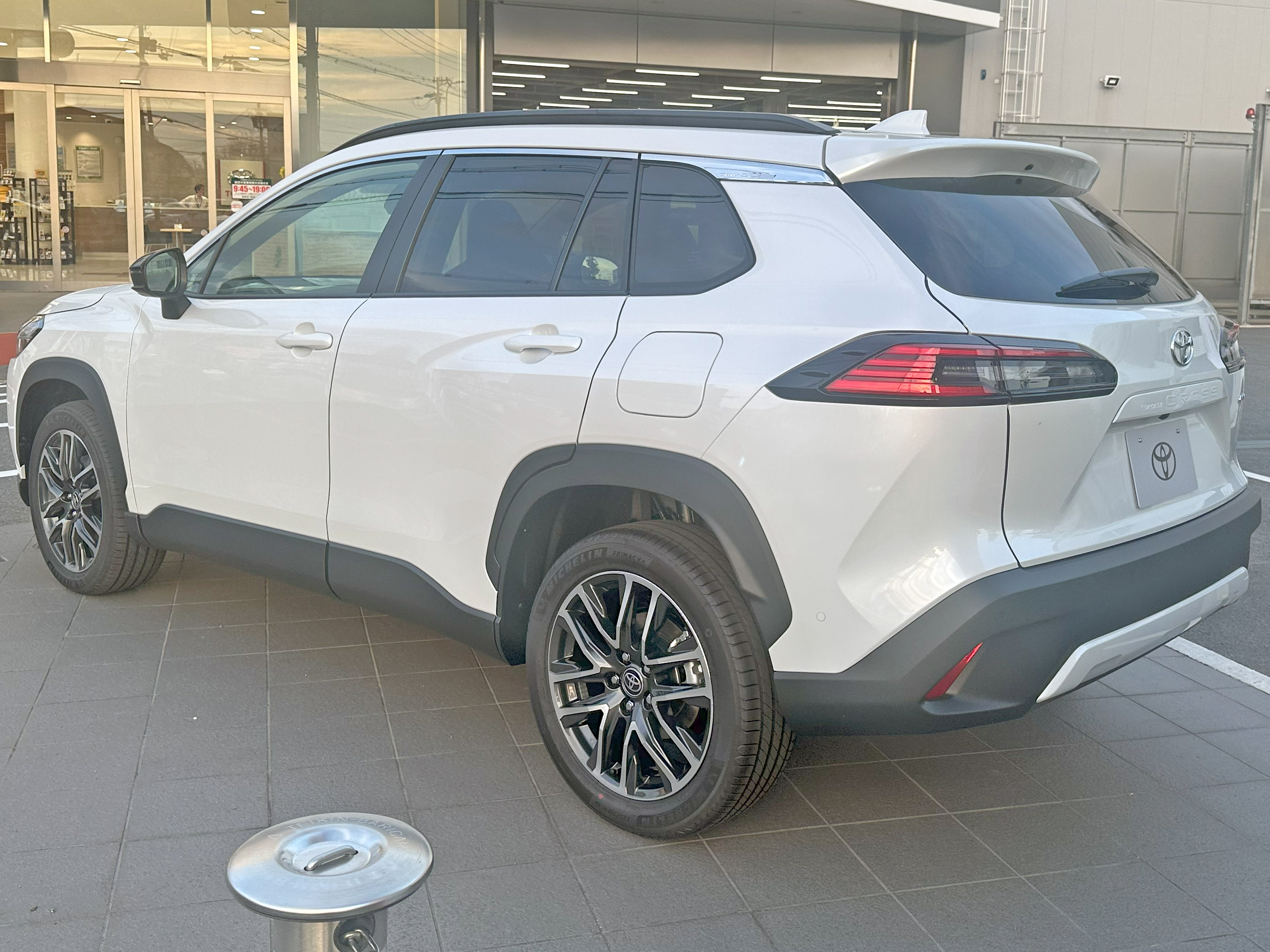
Facelift Corolla Cross Z 2WD (ZVG13)

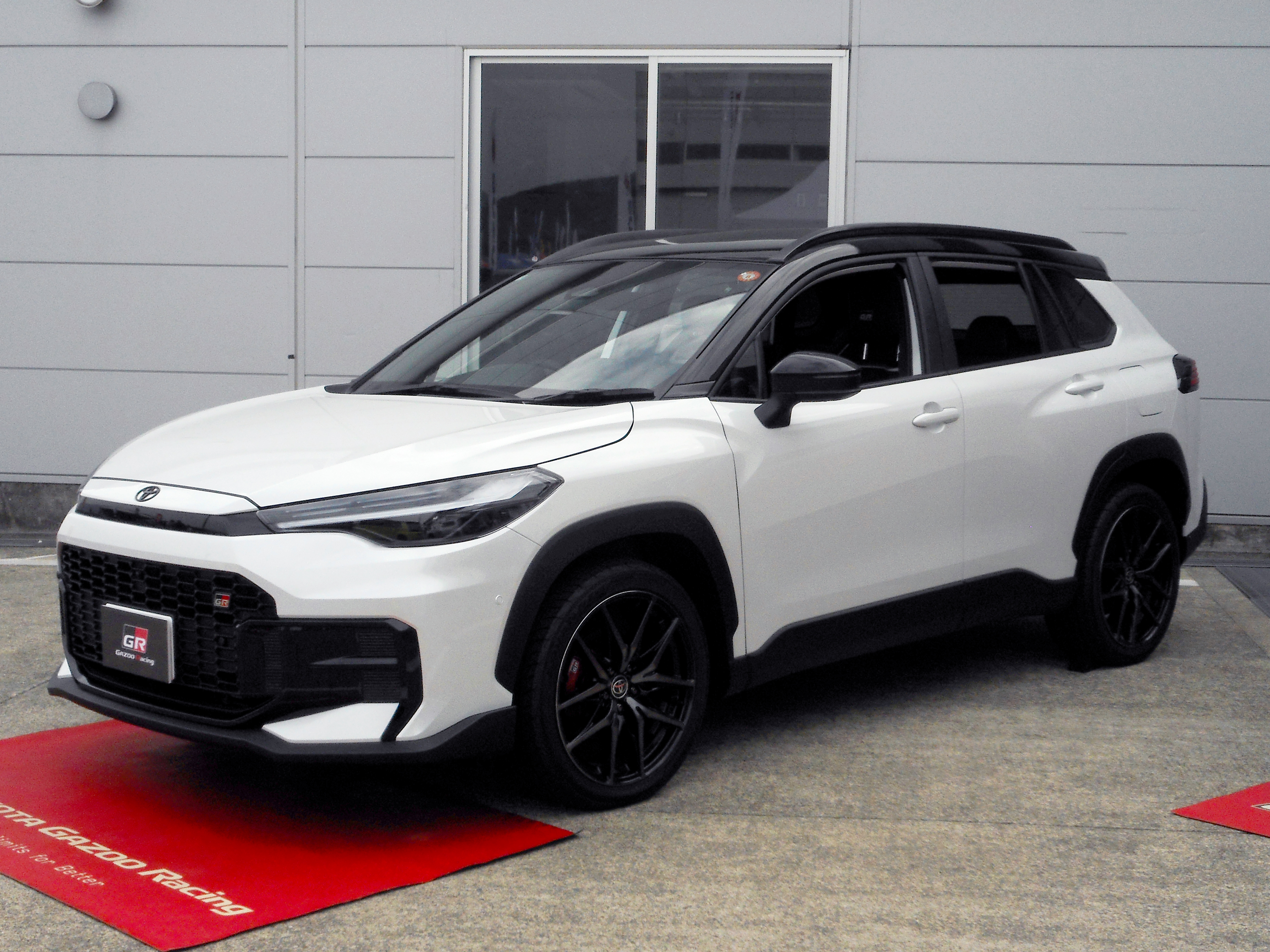
2026 Corolla Cross GR Sport E-Four (MXGH15)

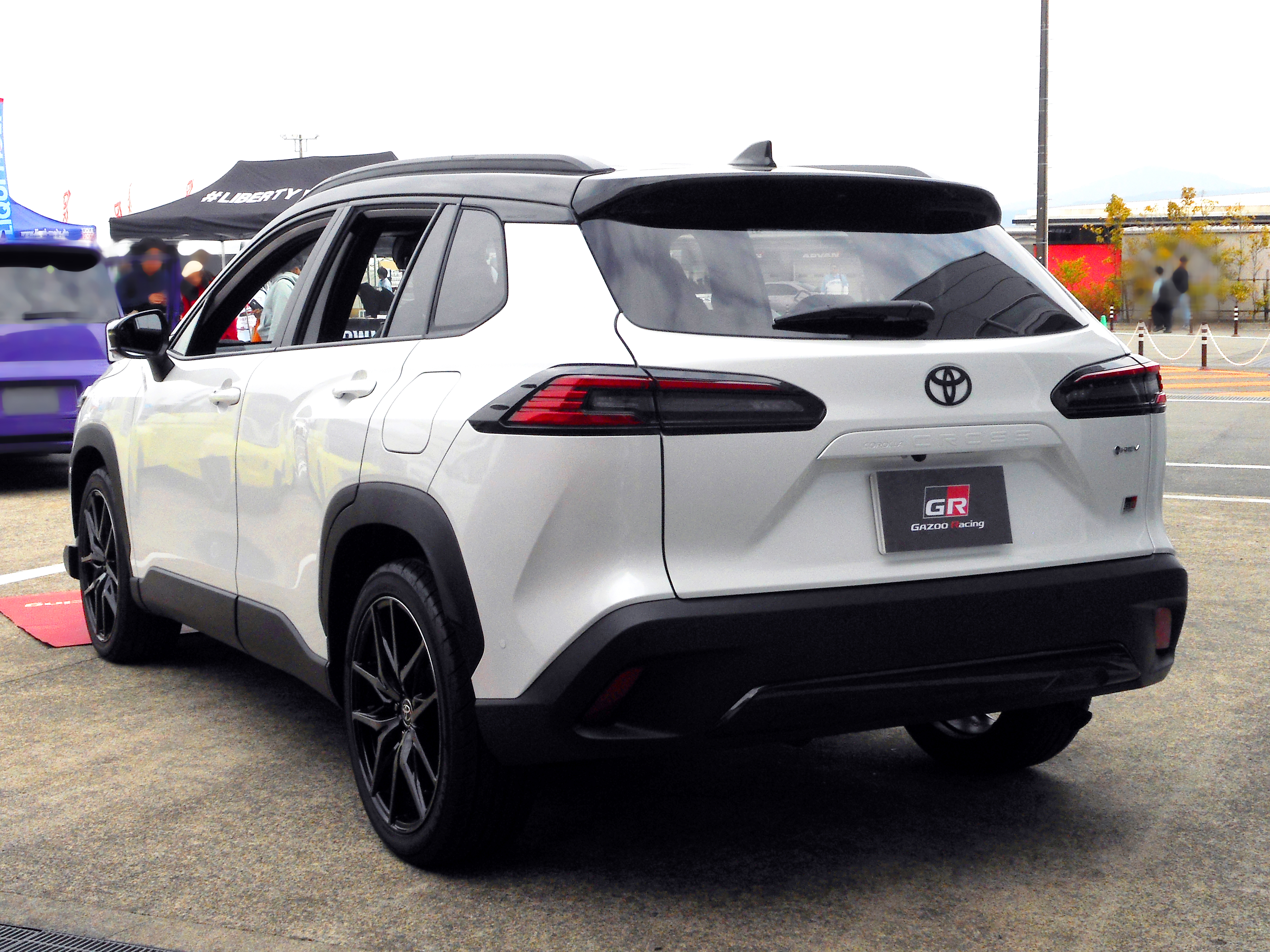
2026 Corolla Cross GR Sport E-Four (MXGH15)

2026 Corolla Cross Z Adventure

==== Malaysia ====
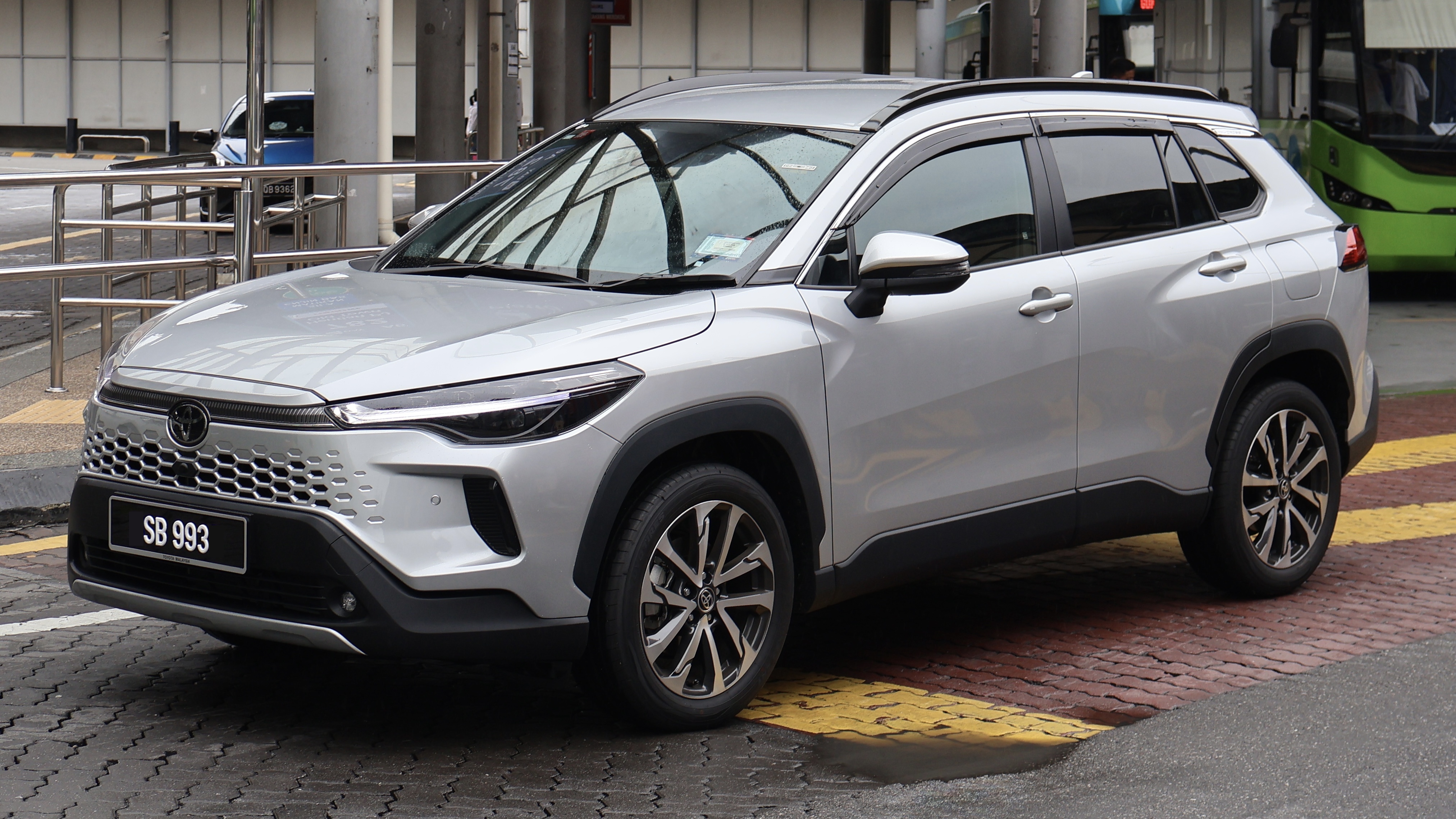
Facelift Corolla Cross 1.8 V (ZSG10, Malaysia)

The Corolla Cross for the Malaysian market was launched on 25 March 2021. Initial trim levels were 1.8 G and 1.8 V. Both trim levels were offered with the 1.8-litre 2ZR-FE engine paired with continuously variable transmission (CVT). The V trim is equipped with Toyota Safety Sense. The early batch of the car were imported from Thailand, while locally assembled model went on sale in October 2021 along with the introduction of the hybrid model. The hybrid version was launched on 14 January 2022. Deliveries for all CKD models started in early 2022. The GR Sport trim (based on 1.8 V trim) was introduced on 17 February 2023.

The facelifted Corolla Cross was launched on 4 December 2024, with three variants: 1.8 V, 1.8 HEV, and 1.8 HEV GR Sport.

==== Middle East ====
Toyota Corolla Cross Hybrid in Tis, near Chabahar. (Imported from UAE)

The Corolla Cross for the GCC markets was launched on 15 March 2021. It is powered by a 1.8-litre hybrid engine paired with CVT transmission. In the UAE market it is offered in two trim levels XL and GLI, the Saudi Arabian market it is offered in three trim levels LE, XLE and LTD, and the Bahrain market it is offered in a single trim.

The facelifted Corolla Cross was launched on 8 January 2025.

==== Myanmar ====
The Corolla Cross for the Burmese market was launched on 4 September 2020 and is only offered in 1.8 V petrol model.

==== Pakistan ====
The Corolla Cross was initially launched in Pakistan in April 2021 as an imported model and was offered in three trim levels. However, the local production of the vehicle started in December 2023, making it Toyota's first hybrid electric vehicle to be assembled in Pakistan. The locally assembled vehicle was initially offered in two hybrid variants: the 1.8 HEV (MID) and the 1.8 HEV X (HIGH). Both variants come with the 1.8-litre 2ZR-FXE hybrid petrol engine.

Later on, in March 2024, two petrol variants of the Corolla Cross were also launched: the 1.8 (MID) and the 1.8 X (HIGH). Both variants come with the 1.8-litre 2ZR-FE petrol engine.

==== Philippines ====
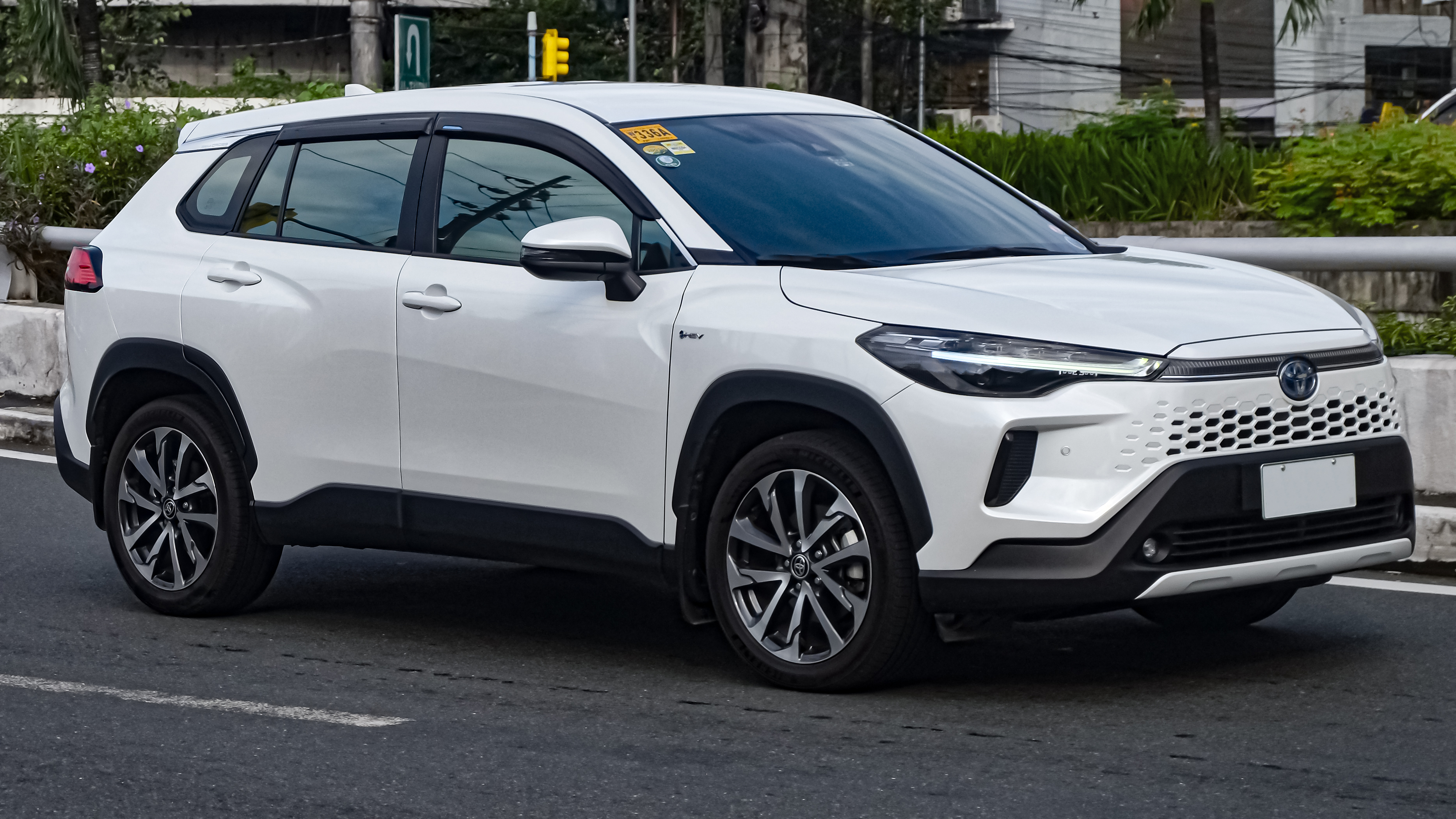
Facelift Corolla Cross Hybrid 1.8 V (ZVG10, Philippines)

The Corolla Cross for the Philippine market was launched on 20 August 2020 and initially offered in 1.8 G and 1.8 V Hybrid trim levels. The hybrid GR Sport variant was later introduced in March 2022.

The facelifted Corolla Cross was launched in the Philippines on 12 April 2024 with an all-hybrid lineup. It is offered with three trim levels: 1.8 G, 1.8 V and 1.8 GR-S, all powered by the carryover 1.8-litre 2ZR-FXE hybrid powertrain. Toyota Safety sense is standard on the V hybrid and GR-Sport hybrid. All trims received styling changes of the facelift model except for the GR Sport at the time of its launch, with the facelifted GR Sport model later followed in March 2026.

==== Taiwan ====
The Corolla Cross for the Taiwanese market was launched on 12 October 2020. It is offered in 1.8 G, 1.8 V and 1.8 Hybrid trim levels. All trim levels are equipped with Toyota Safety Sense. The hybrid GR Sport trim was launched on 14 September 2021.

The facelifted Corolla Cross was launched in Taiwan on 1 October 2024, with seven variants: Petrol Luxury, Petrol Premium, Petrol GR Sport, Hybrid Luxury, Hybrid Premium, Hybrid Flagship and Hybrid GR Sport. The facelifted GR Sport trim was launched on 7 October 2025.

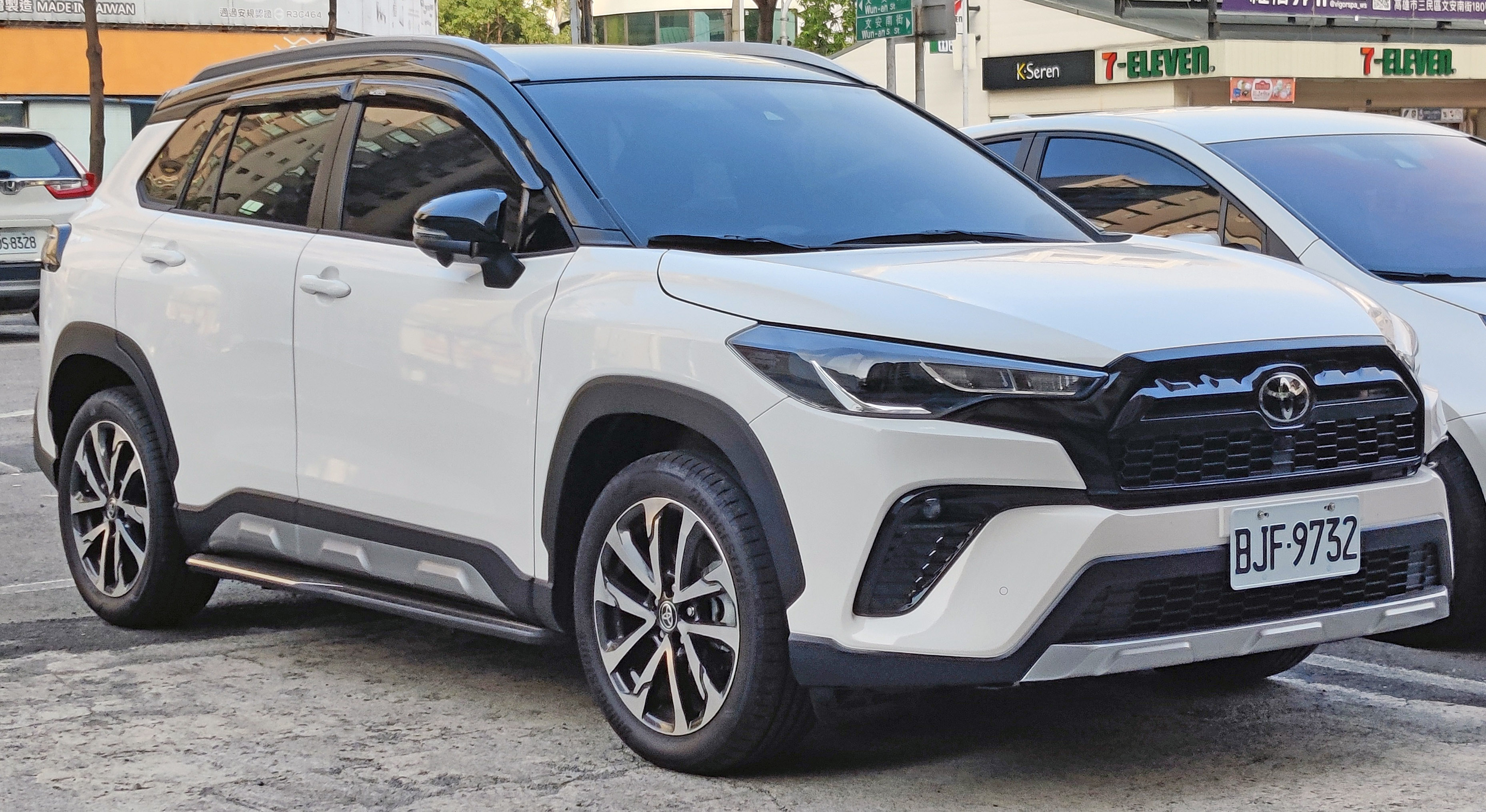
Corolla Cross Hybrid GR Sport (Taiwan)

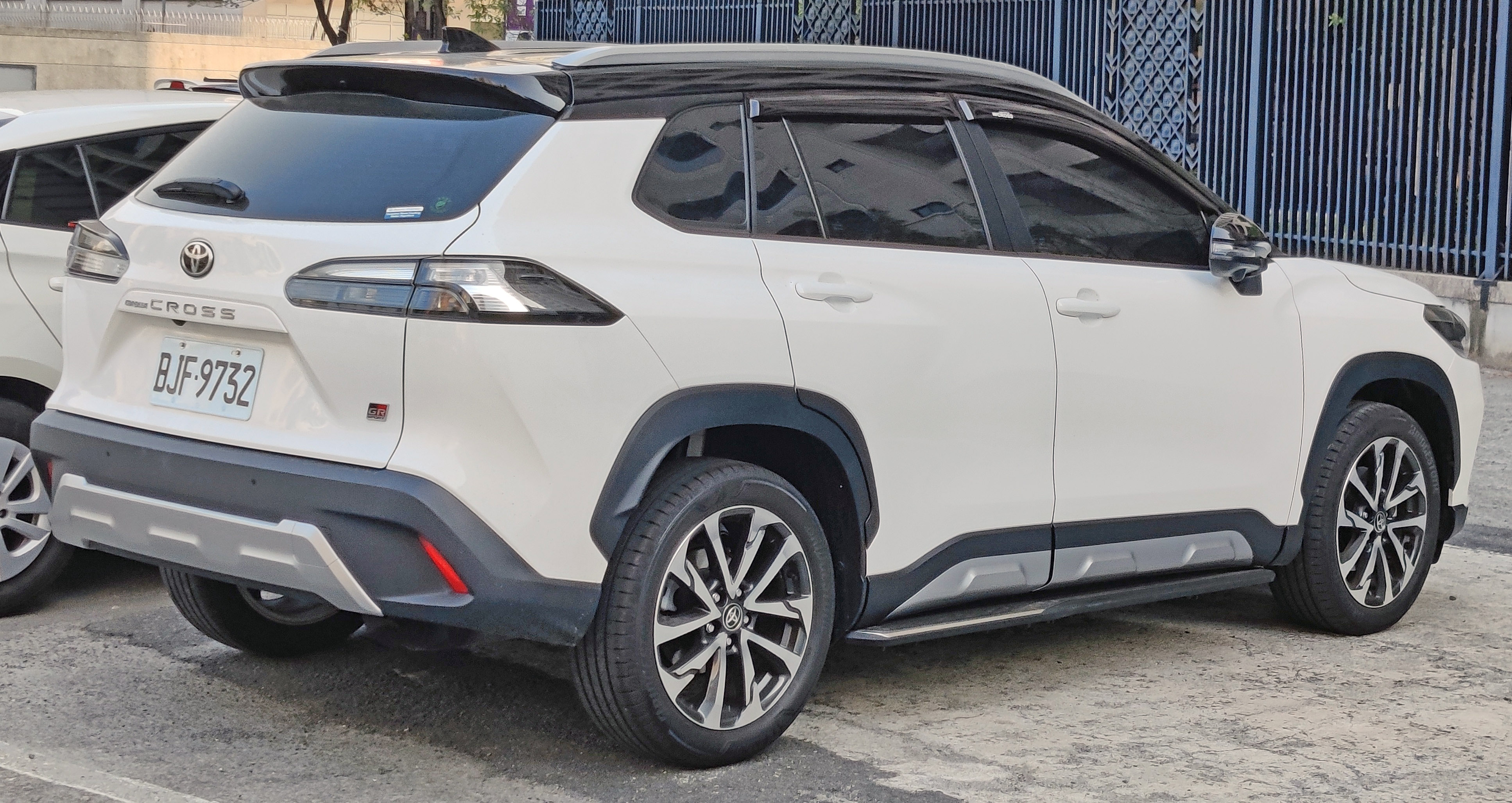
Corolla Cross Hybrid GR Sport (Taiwan)

==== Thailand ====
The Corolla Cross for the Thai market was launched on 9 July 2020. It was initially offered in 1.8 Sport, Hybrid Smart, Hybrid Premium and Hybrid Premium Safety trim levels. The Hybrid Premium Safety trim is equipped with Toyota Safety Sense. In September 2021, the Corolla Cross is given the Modellista accessories package on top of existing variants in Thailand. The GR Sport trim was released in November 2021 with a redesigned front fascia. The base Sport trim was replaced by Sport Plus trim in late November 2022.

The facelifted Corolla Cross was launched in Thailand on 8 February 2024, with four variants: Sport Plus, HEV Premium, HEV Premium Luxury and HEV GR Sport. In January 2026, the Sport Plus petrol variant was replaced by the HEV Smart as the entry-level variant, therefore the Corolla Cross became available only with hybrid powertrains.

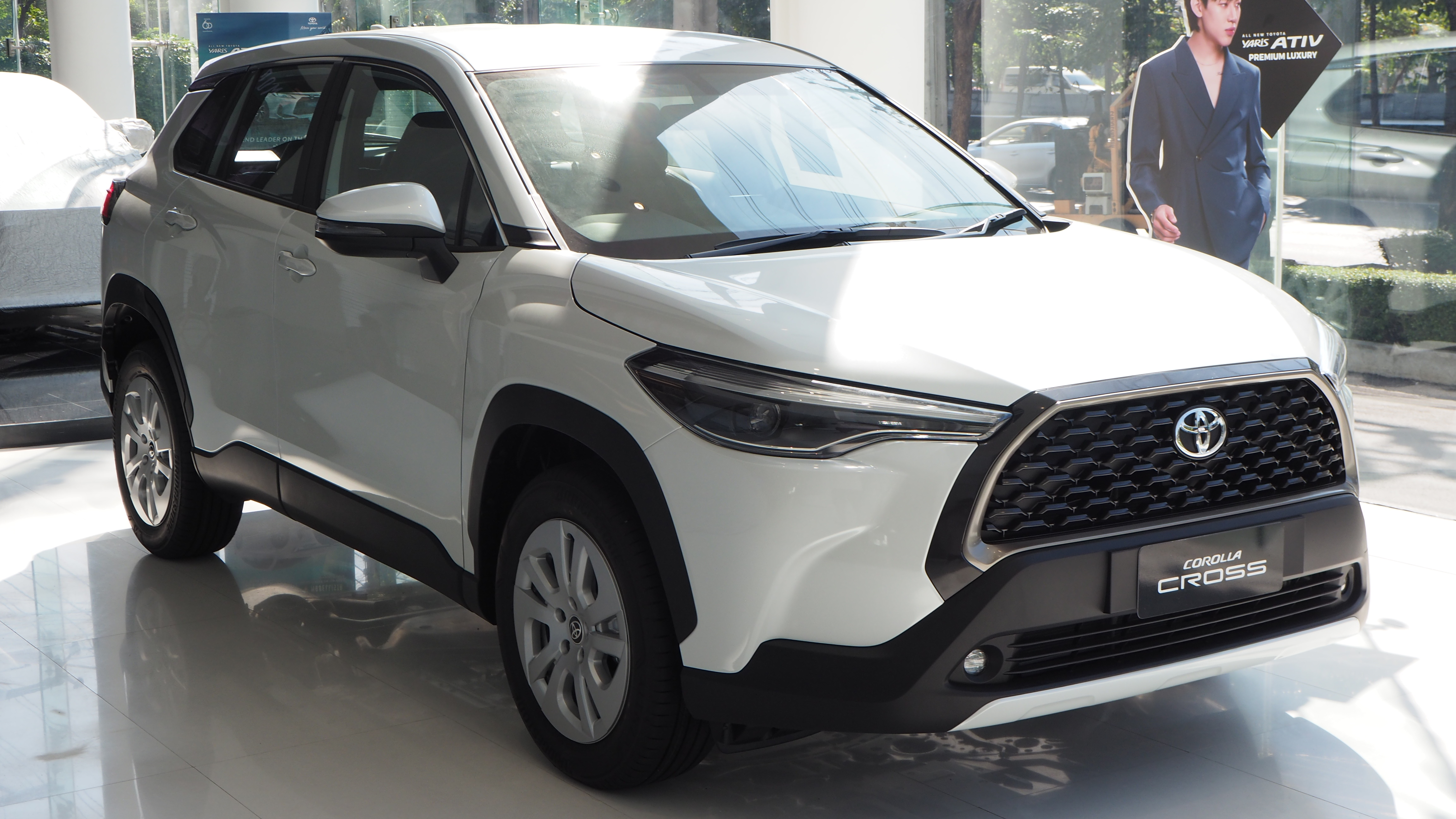
Pre-facelift Toyota Corolla Cross 1.8 Sport Plus

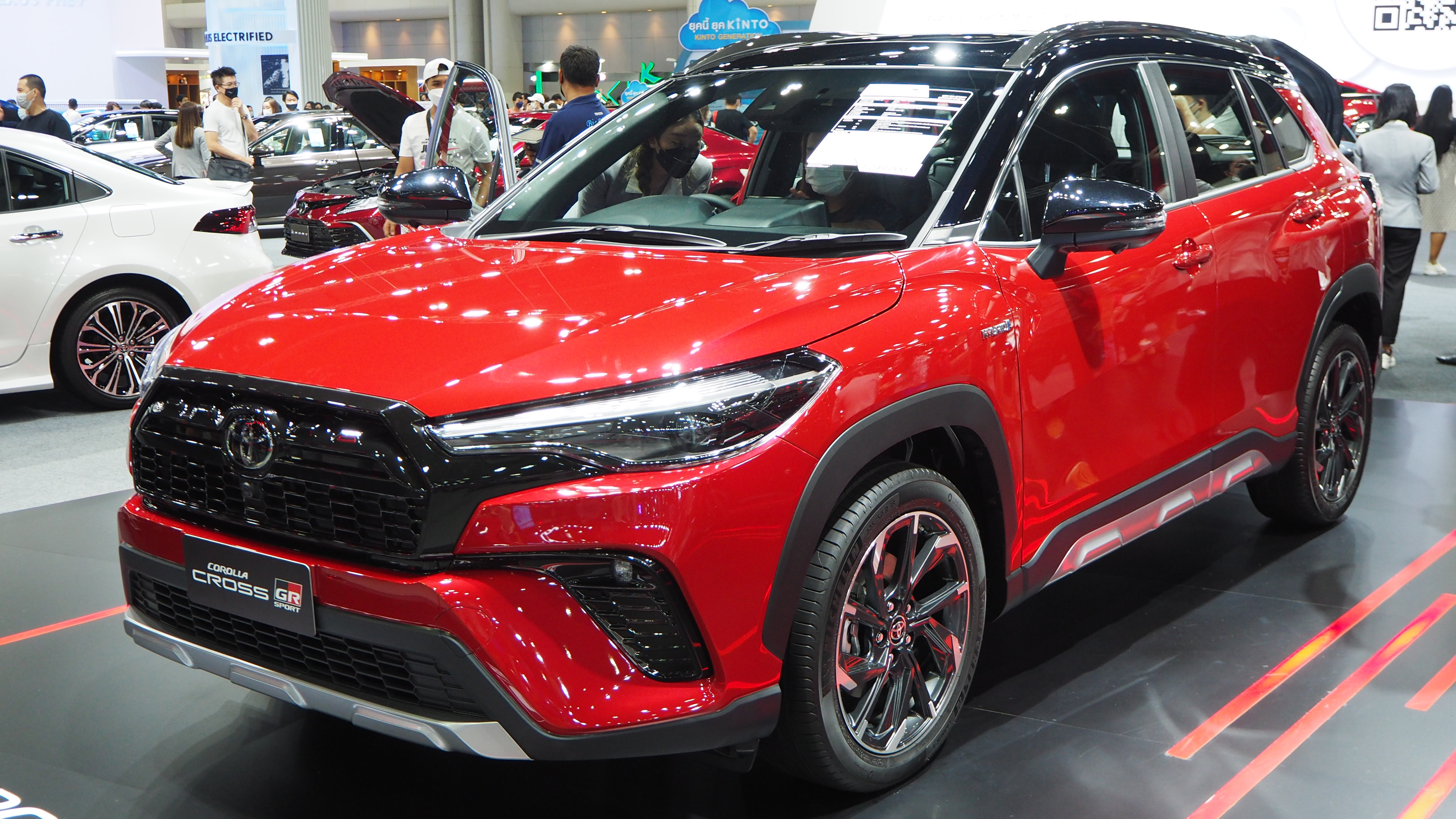
Pre-facelift Toyota Corolla Cross Hybrid GR Sport

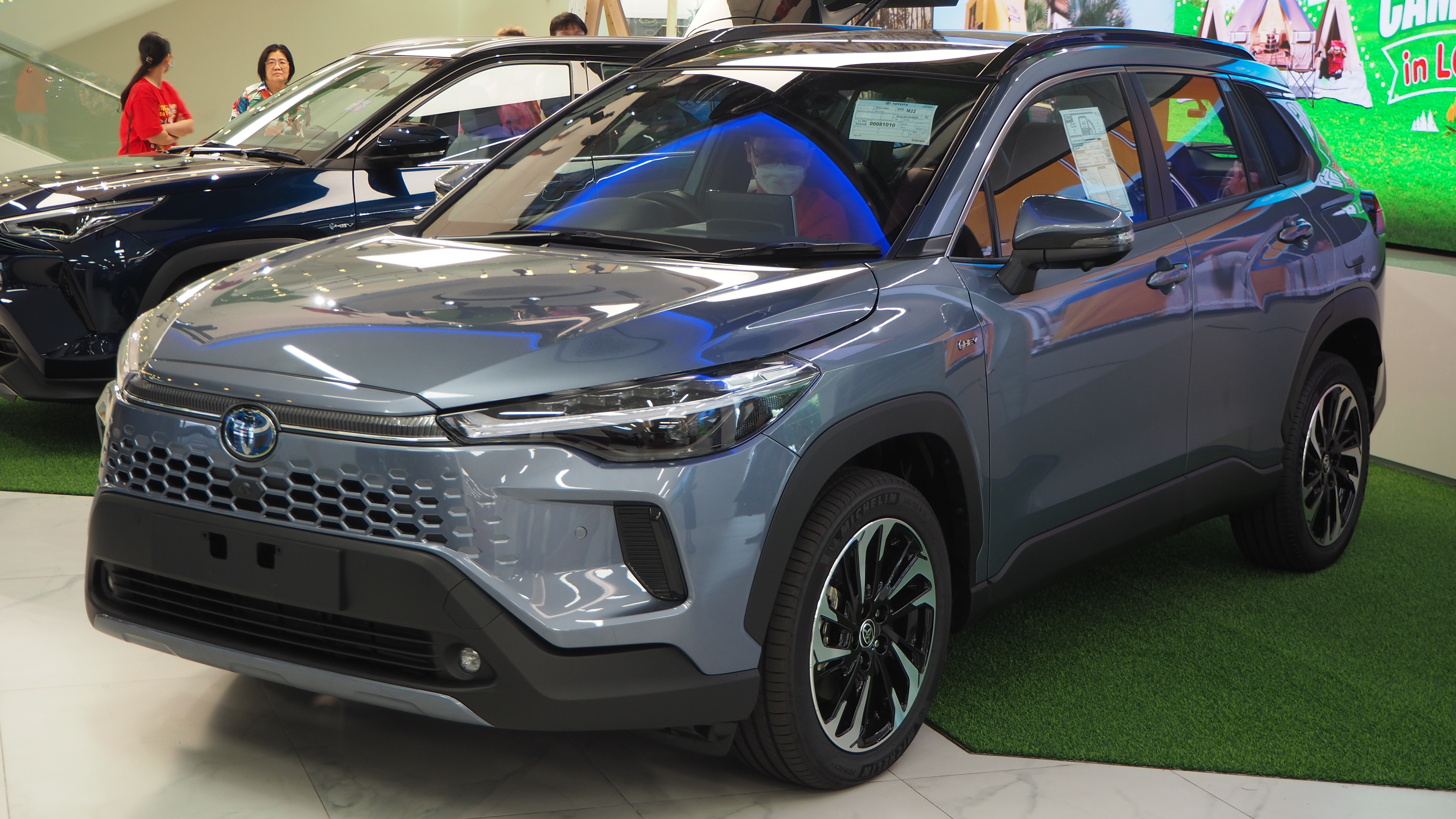
Facelift Corolla Cross HEV Premium Luxury

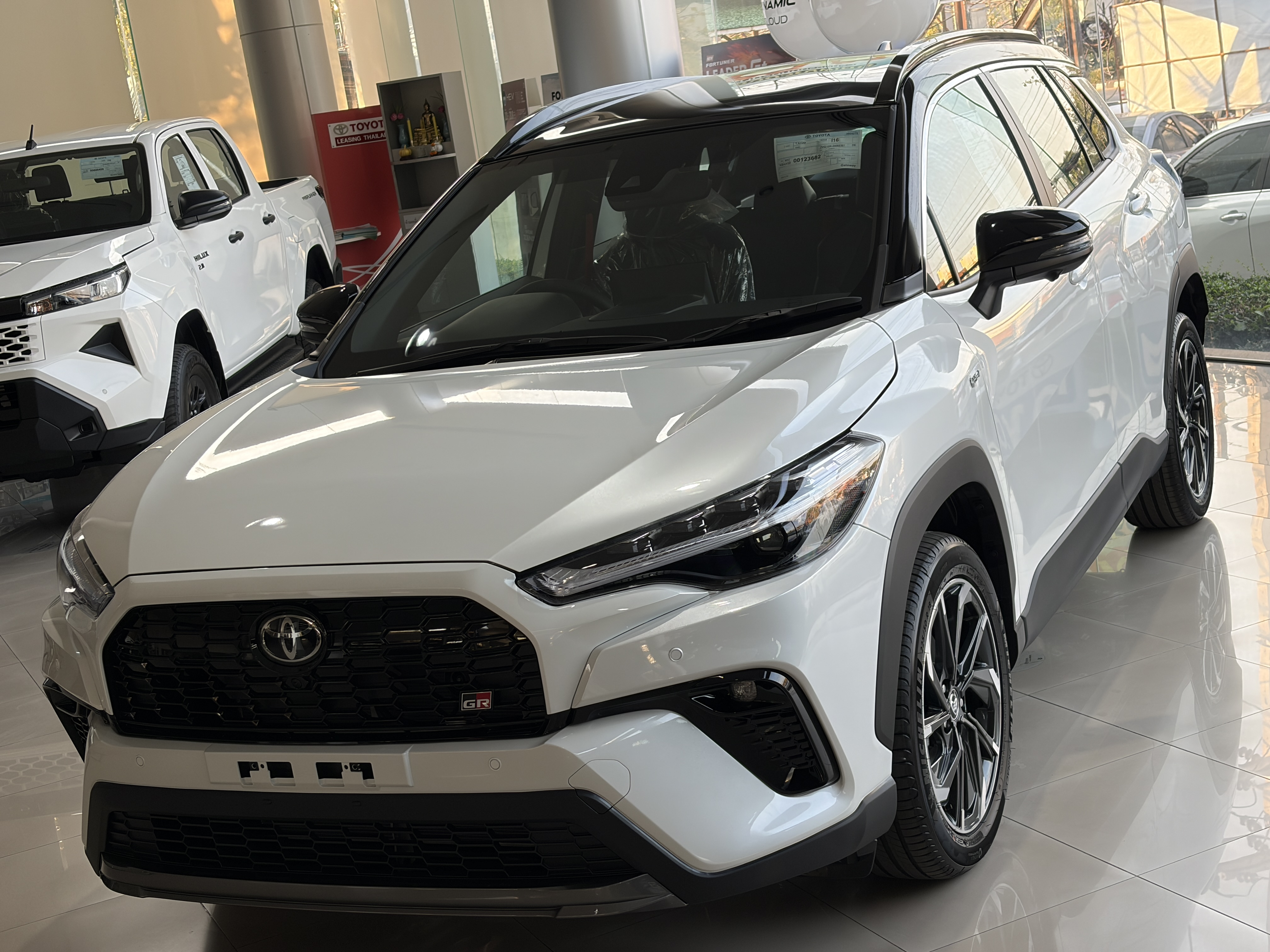
Facelift Toyota Corolla Cross HEV GR Sport

==== Vietnam ====
The Corolla Cross for the Vietnamese market was launched on 5 August 2020. It is offered in 1.8 G, 1.8 V and 1.8 Hybrid trim levels. The 1.8 V and 1.8 Hybrid trim levels are equipped with Toyota Safety Sense. The facelifted Corolla Cross was launched on 6 May 2024 with two variants available: V and HEV.

=== Europe ===
The new Toyota Corolla Cross for the European market debuted in September 2022 alongside the fourth generation Nissan X-Trail. Built in Japan, the European market Corolla Cross is powered by a 2.0-litre M20A-FXS hybrid petrol engine with a combined output of 146 kW (196 hp; 199 PS). An all-wheel drive model (AWD-i) is available with an additional rear electric motor producing 30.6 kW (41 hp; 42 PS). It is equipped with the Japanese-model headlight and taillight clusters, while equipment list included panoramic roof, 12.3-inch instrument panel and a 10.5-inch central display.

The facelifted Corolla Cross debuted in Europe in May 2025, with the High and GR Sport trims.

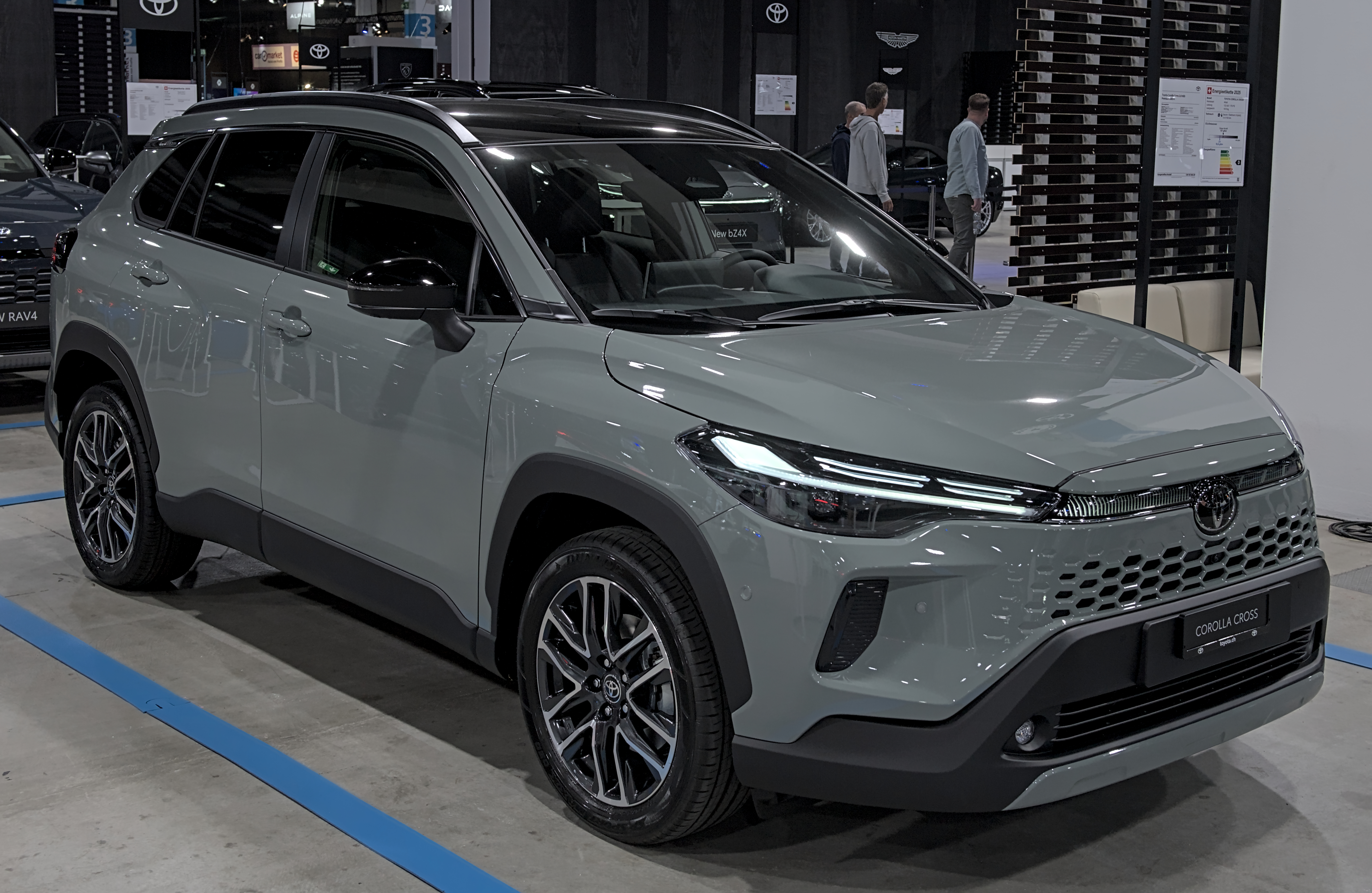
Facelift Corolla Cross Hybrid (Europe; front)

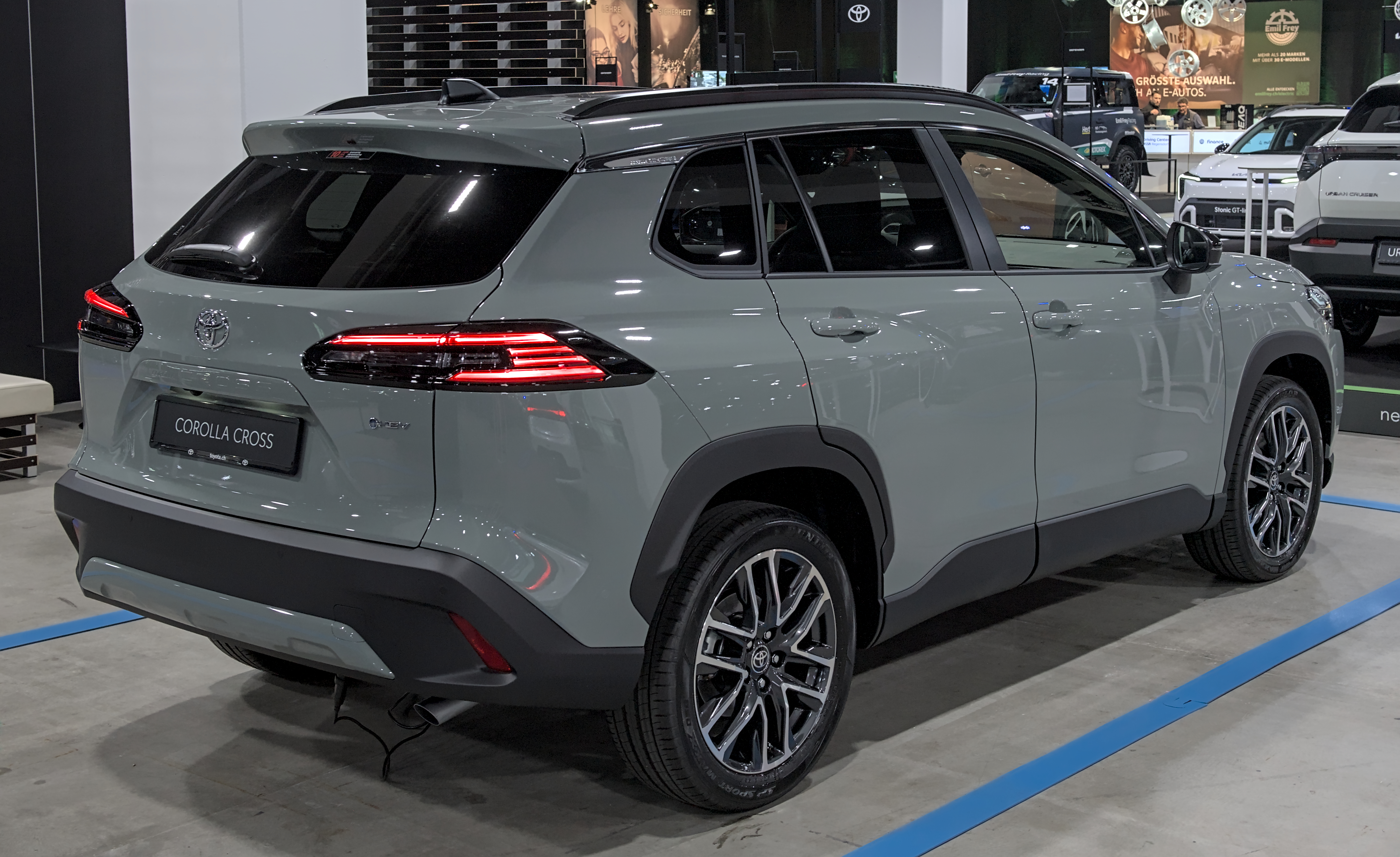
Facelift Corolla Cross Hybrid (Europe; rear)

Facelift Corolla Cross Hybrid GR Sport (Europe)

=== Oceania ===
==== Australia ====
The Corolla Cross was announced for the Australian market in August 2022, and went on sale on 12 October 2022. Imported from Japan and sharing the styling with the European market Corolla Cross, the trim levels offered are GX, GXL and Atmos with either a 2.0-litre M20A-FKS petrol or a 2.0-litre M20A-FXS hybrid petrol engines. All-wheel drive option is available for hybrid models. The Corolla Cross lineup in Australia became hybrid-only in July 2024.

==== New Zealand ====
The Corolla Cross for New Zealand market went on sale on 13 October 2022. Like the Australian model, it is imported from Japan and also shares the styling with the European market Corolla Cross. trim levels offered are GX, GXL and Limited with either a 2.0-litre M20A-FKS petrol or a 2.0-litre M20A-FXS hybrid petrol engines. All-wheel drive option is available for hybrid models.

== Concept models ==
=== Corolla Cross H2 Concept ===
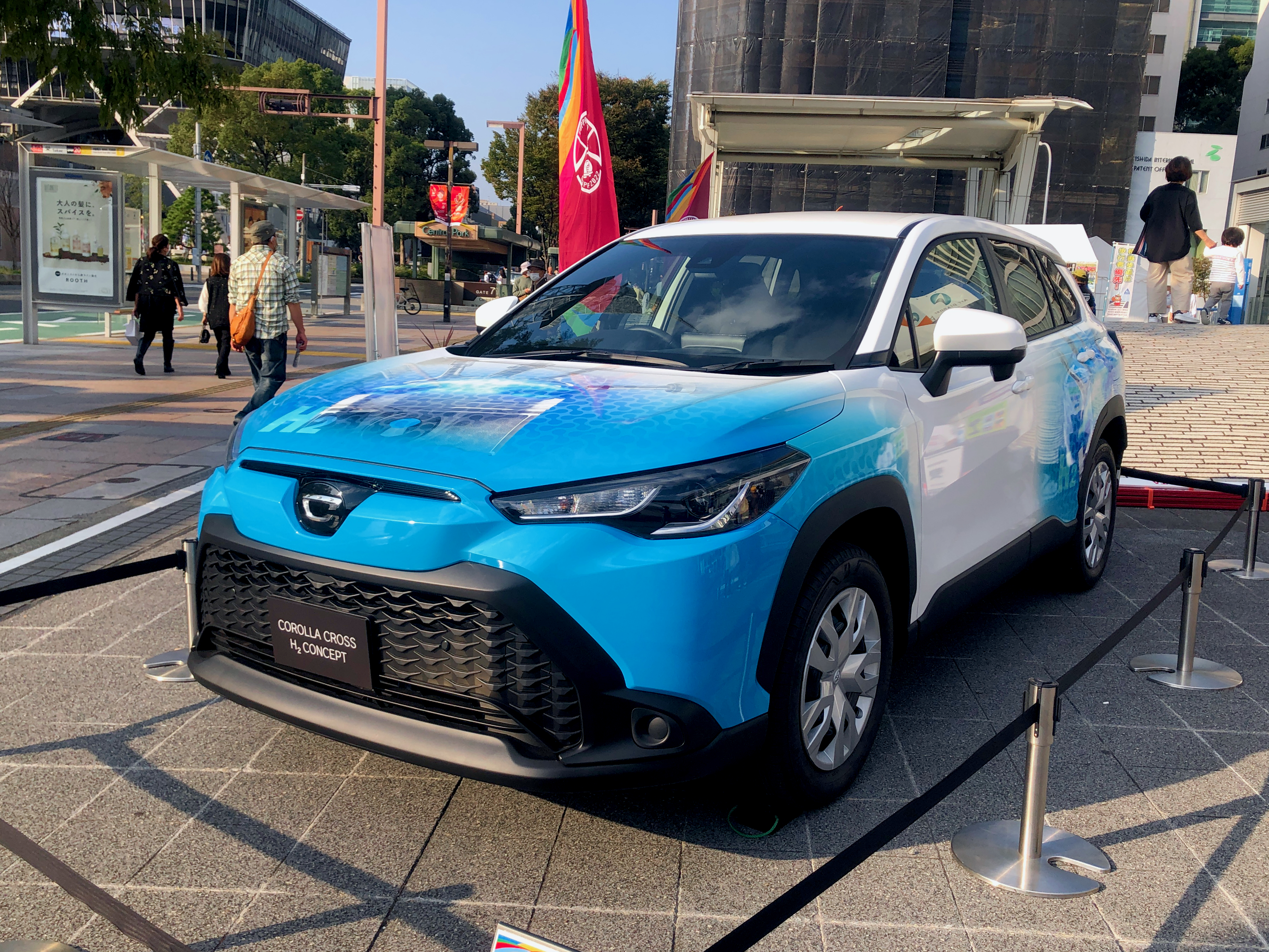
Corolla Cross H2 Concept

The Corolla Cross H2 Concept is a Corolla Cross prototype fitted with a modified G16E-GTS engine to run with hydrogen fuel.

== Safety ==
The US market Corolla Cross was awarded the "Top Safety Pick+" by the Insurance Institute for Highway Safety in 2021. It received overall Good and Superior ratings on all categories except headlights, as only the XLE trim with Adaptive Front Lighting System received the Good rating while the other trims were rated Acceptable.

ANCAP test results Toyota Corolla Cross all variants excluding GR Sport (2022, aligned with Euro NCAP)
Test	Points	%
Overall:	5 /5 stars	
Adult occupant:	32.63	85%
Child occupant:	43.20	88%
Pedestrian:	46.98	87%
Safety assist:	13.40	83%

ASEAN NCAP test results Toyota Corolla Cross (2020)
Test	Points
Overall:	5 /5 stars
Adult occupant:	45.85
Child occupant:	22.83
Safety assist:	20.13

Global NCAP 2.5 test results (Africa) Toyota Corolla Cross (2026, similar to Latin NCAP 2019)
Test	Score	Stars
Adult occupant protection	29.27/34.00	2 /5 stars
Child occupant protection	33.00/49.00	3 /5 stars

Euro NCAP test results Toyota Corolla Cross 2.0 Hybrid (2022)
Test	Points	%
Overall:	5 /5 stars	
Adult occupant:	32.6	85%
Child occupant:	40.9	83%
Pedestrian:	47.0	87%
Safety assist:	13.2	82%

IIHS scores
Small overlap frontal offset: Driver-side	Good
Small overlap frontal offset: Passenger-side	Good
Moderate overlap front	Good
Side impact	Good
Roof strength	Good
Head restraints and seats	Good
Headlights (XLE trim equipped with Adaptive Front Lighting System package)	Good
Headlights (all trims except XLE with Adaptive Front Lighting System package)	Acceptable
Front crash prevention: Vehicle-to-vehicle	Superior
Front crash prevention: Vehicle-to-pedestrian	Superior
Child restraint latch ease of use	Good+

TNCAP (1.0) test result Toyota Corolla Cross 'Deluxe' (petrol) (2023, similar to Euro NCAP 2017)
Test	Points	%
Overall:	5/5 stars	
Adult occupant:	32.641	85%
Child occupant:	39.381	80%
Pedestrian:	34.657	82%
Safety assist:	8.25	68%

== Awards ==
The Corolla Cross was the 2022 South African Car of the Year.

== Sales ==
Calendar year	Japan	Thailand	Vietnam	Indonesia	Malaysia	Philippines	Taiwan	U.S.	Canada	Mexico	Colombia	Brazil	Argentina	Europe (Note: Toyota Motor Europe: which includes all of Europe, and also Russia, Turkey, Armenia, Georgia, Azerbaijan, Kazakhstan and Israel)	South Africa	Australia	China	
Calendar year	Japan	Thailand	Vietnam	Indonesia	Malaysia	Philippines	Taiwan	U.S.	Canada	Mexico	Colombia	Brazil	Argentina	Europe	South Africa	Australia	Corolla Cross	Frontlander
2020		12,945	7,070	1,101		598	12,080											
2021	17,780	18,770	18,411	1,519	3,735	1,539	40,675	7,203		316	380	34,255	4,629		3,610			
2022	59,070	20,979	21,473	1,001	17,208		39,585	56,666	9,263	2,552	5,383	42,460	12,691	11,417	15,841	2,563		
2023	67,350	18,730	10,485	1,217	18,095	3,366	37,412	71,110	13,140	3,236	5,798	42,075	11,350	47,026	22,592	7,932	142,836	183,175
2024		15,032	7,644	109	14,805	3,921	33,788	93,021		7,376	7,514	47,784	15,418	54,447	21,861	8,902	190,992	204,874
2025		14,395			16,192			99,798				59,678	18,151	58,035	22,191		186,575	174,434

== See also ==
- List of Toyota vehicles
