= CHR =

CHR or chr may refer to:

== Organisations ==
- Canadians for Health Research, a national not-for-profit organisation
- Centre for Human Rights, an organisation promoting human rights in Africa
- Christ Church Secondary School, a government-aided school in Woodlands, Singapore
- Commission on Human Rights (Philippines), an independent constitutional office

== Science and technology ==
- .CHR, a stroke file format in the Borland Graphics Interface
- Chromosome, a DNA molecule with genetic material
- Constraint Handling Rules, a computer programming language

== Other uses ==
- chr, the code for Cherokee language in ISO 639-2 and ISO 639-3
- CHR, the Index Herbariorum code for the Allan Herbarium
- Canadian Historical Review, a scholarly journal
- Châteauroux-Centre "Marcel Dassault" Airport, a French airport (IATA code: CHR)
- Chatham House Rule, whereby information from a discussion can be used but the source not named
- Christmas Island, ITU code
- Contemporary hit radio, a radio format playing current popular music
- Toyota C-HR, a subcompact crossover SUV
