= CSCI =

CSCI may refer to:

- Cambridge Stem Cell Institute
- Canadian Society for Clinical Investigation
- Chartered Scientist (CSci), a professional qualification in the United Kingdom
- China State Construction International Holdings
- Commission for Social Care Inspection
- Computer Software Configuration Item, designation of end use software product under MIL-STD-498 and DOD-STD-2167A
