= Toyota G Sports =

Enhancements for Toyota vehicles

The Toyota G Sports or G's is a range of enhancements that was offered for some cars manufactured by Toyota. The enhancements included body kits, interiors, wheels, suspension, and drive-line components. In 2016, the G's lineup was changed to GR Sport lineup.

The launch at the January 2010 Tokyo Auto Salon had the following vehicles on display:

- FT-86 G Sports Concept
- Noah G Sports Concept
- Voxy G Sports Concept
- Mark X G Sports Concept
- Prius G Sports Concept

The production models included:

- Vitz RS G's
- Mark X G's
- Prius G's
- Aqua G's
- Harrier G's
- Prius α G's
- Noah G's/Voxy G's
- Alphard G's/Vellfire G's

== See also ==
- Toyota Gazoo Racing
