= Toyota Gazoo Racing =

Motorsport/performance brand of Toyota

Toyota Gazoo Racing (TGR)
- Product type: High-performance engines and cars Automotive sports accessories Motorsport services
- Current owner: Toyota Motor Corporation
- Produced by: Toyota
- Introduced: 2007
- Markets: Worldwide
- Tagline: Pushing the Limits for Better
- Website: toyotagazooracing.com
- Key people: Tomoya Takahashi (President and General Manager)

Toyota Gazoo Racing (TGR), stylised as TOYOTA GAZOO Racing, is a motorsport division of the Japanese car manufacturer Toyota. Alongside competition activities, the division develops technologies for the Gazoo Racing (GR) sub-brand of Toyota's sports and performance-oriented production road cars.

TGR competes most notably as the manufacturer's entries in FIA's World Rally Championship (as TGR WRT), World Endurance Championship and World Rally-Raid Championship. Toyota Gazoo Racing Europe (TGR Europe) is a research and development facility based in Cologne, Germany, with branches in the United Kingdom and Finland.

The GR-branded performance road cars include the GR Supra, the GR Yaris, the GR86, the GR Corolla, and the GR GT.

In October 2024, TGR entered Formula One with Haas F1 Team as a technical partner. The partnership includes aiming to foster the growth of young Japanese drivers, engineers, and mechanics in the sport. From 2026, the partnership was extended with TGR becoming Haas' title sponsor.

== History ==
In 2007, an in-house team consisting of student test drivers and mechanics led by Hiromu Naruse, who was a test driver of Toyota, competed in the 24 Hours Nürburgring race. Akio Toyoda, then the vice president of Toyota, who received driving instruction directly from Naruse, also participated as a driver. At that time, he was not allowed to call the team "Works Toyota Racing". Therefore, the name Team Gazoo was used instead. "Gazoo" (from 画像 (Gazō, lit. "image")) is the name of a portal site that Toyota was involved in establishing—and in public relations, the drivers were also given the nicknames "Cap" for Naruse and "Morizo" for Toyoda. Also, as there were minimal budgets, they used the Altezzas and BMW E90s, which at the time had been discontinued, as the race car project. The Gazoo website posted the activity report as an amateur race project.

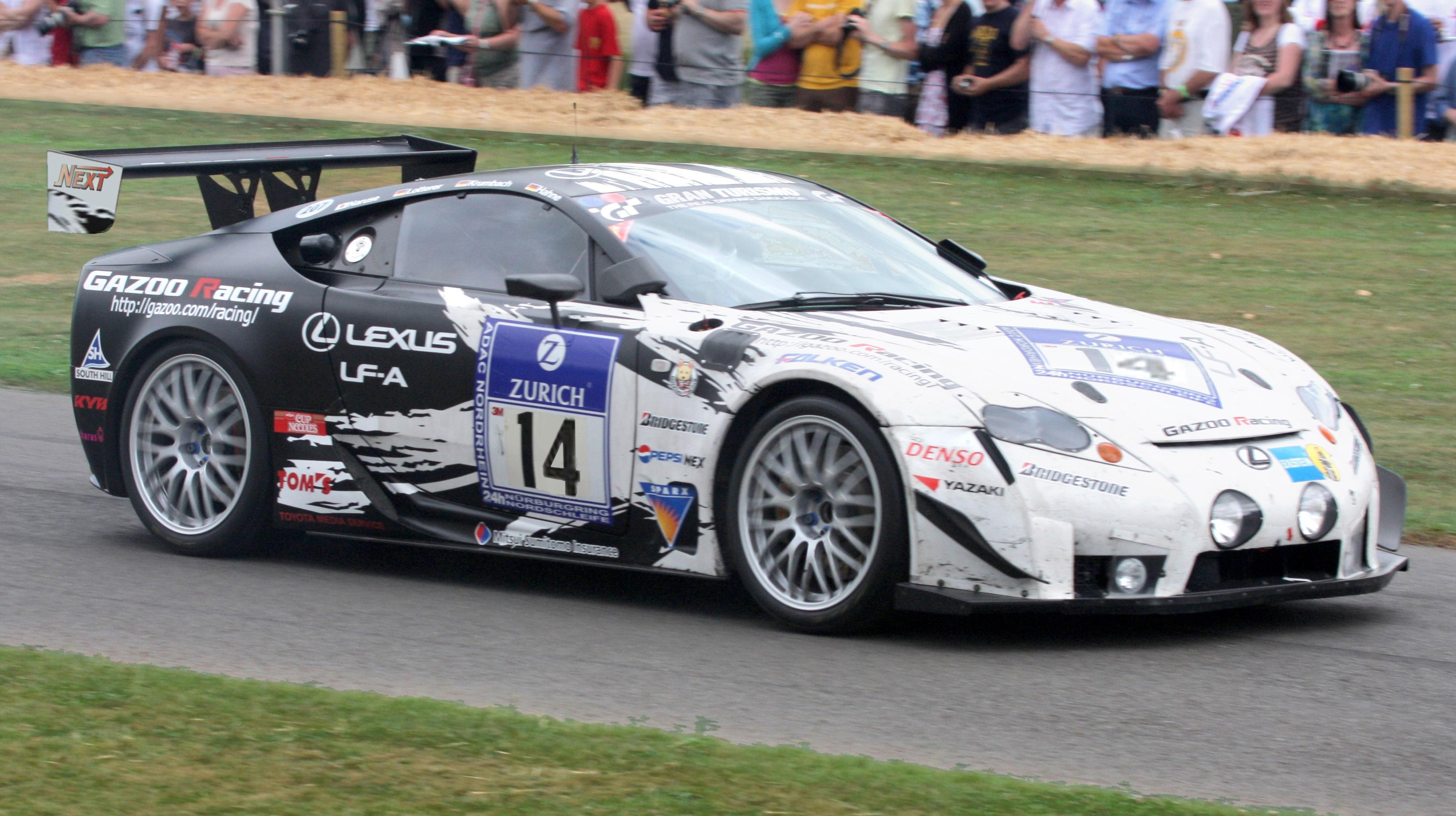
Lexus LF-A Gazoo Racing at the Goodwood Festival of Speed

From 2002 to 2009, Toyota Motorsport GmbH, based in Cologne, Germany (now Toyota Gazoo Racing Europe), had been engineering and developing Formula One cars for their parent company Toyota to compete in the FIA Formula One World Championship, the highest and the most prestigious single seater auto-racing championship in the world, within these eight years their Toyota Formula One team racing under the name Panasonic Toyota Racing, rarely achieved success with the total of thirteen podium finishes which includes five second places, three pole positions and three fastest laps recorded. Being the highest budget team in the sport with experienced drivers on the F1 grid, they failed to win a single race and withdrew from the sport at the end of the 2009 season, stating the global economic crisis which had severely affected the automotive industry to be the main reason; Toyota's main Japanese rival in the sport Honda had already departed from F1 a year before in 2008. Although Toyota had already developed their F1 car TF110 for the 2010 season but complete withdrawal from F1 activities had put an end to their time in the sport. Toyota also supplied their Formula One engines to Jordan F1 Racing, Midland F1 Racing and the Williams Formula One Team during their eight years time in the sport.

From 2009 onwards, as the company continued to participate in their motorsports activities, they introduced and engineered the development models such as the Lexus LF-A and the FT-86 with the goal of "training people and cars at the Nürburgring, the sacred place for new car development" under the Gazoo Racing name. The drivers include professional racers such as Takayuki Kinoshita, Akira Iida, and Hiroaki Ishiura, but the mechanics and engineers are selected from the employees. In 2014, the team had to play a three-class domination to honor Naruse's accidental death in June 2010.

After Toyoda taking office as the President of Toyota in 2009, the scope of Gazoo Racing has expanded, and it has organized several circuit events such as the "86/BRZ Race" and the "Toyota Gazoo Racing Festival", which is held every November. In addition, the sports conversion brands called "GRMN" (Gazoo Racing, tuned by the Meister of the Nürburgring) and "G's/G Sports" was established in 2009 and 2010 respectively.

In April 2015, all motorsports activities that had been divided into "Gazoo Racing", "Toyota Racing" and "Lexus Racing" have been unified with "Gazoo Racing". Toyota and Lexus brand racing activities are under the Gazoo Racing umbrella and are called "Toyota Gazoo Racing" and "Lexus Gazoo Racing". From this year onwards, Toyota Gazoo Racing (TGR) works machines use a common color scheme of red and black stripes on a white background. At the same time, the "Great Skills Training Department" has been set up to develop human resources who can participate in Gazoo Racing activities centered on rallies and Nürburgring.

In 2016, Juichi Wakisaka retired from Super GT and became an ambassador for TGR. TGR also had acquired the naming rights for the first corner of the affiliated Fuji Speedway and renamed it to "TGR Corner". In addition, actor Takeru Satoh was appointed as a television advertisement character to carry out publicity activities.

In 2017, the Toyota Gazoo Racing Factory, which had been developing motorsport vehicles, was reorganized and the "Gazoo Racing Company" was established. As an in-house company, it strengthened its independence and contributed to Toyota's car making by feeding back the knowledge gained in the race to road cars, and the direction to secure profitability was decided. The sports conversion brand was reorganized into the GR series ("GRMN", "GR", "GR Sport/GR-S" and "GR Parts"), and the "GR Garage", which is a regional base, was set up at dealers in each region.

In 2019, the GR Supra, the first GR brand-exclusive car, was released. The GR Supra shares a platform with the BMW Z4 (G29) and is produced under contract by Magna Steyr in Austria.

In 2020, the GR Yaris, the second GR-branded car, and the first produced by Toyota, was launched. It is produced at the "GR Factory" inside the Motomachi plant, a production line dedicated to GR-branded vehicles. Unlike most automobile plants, the "GR Factory" does not use a conveyor belt assembly line, instead vehicles are built at stations with more manual assembly processes. The "GR Factory" employs experienced technicians recruited from throughout the company.

In 2021, the GR86, the third GR-branded car, was introduced. The vehicle is the second generation of the 86 sports car, which are jointly developed with Subaru, and produced at Subaru's Gunma assembly plant.

In 2022, the GR Corolla, the fourth GR-branded car, and the second produced by Toyota, was unveiled to the public. Built primarily for the North American market, the GR Corolla is produced at the "GR Factory" alongside the GR Yaris, which is not sold in North America.

In 2025, the GR GT, the fifth GR-branded car, the third produced by Toyota and the first standalone GR-branded car, was unveiled to the public.

In January 2026, Toyota announced that TGR will revert to the name Gazoo Racing "to strengthen the motorsports-bred making of ever-better cars and the fostering of talent" whereas TGR Europe will be renamed to Toyota Racing. The exercise will be completed in January 2027.

== Motorsport ==
=== World Rally Championship ===
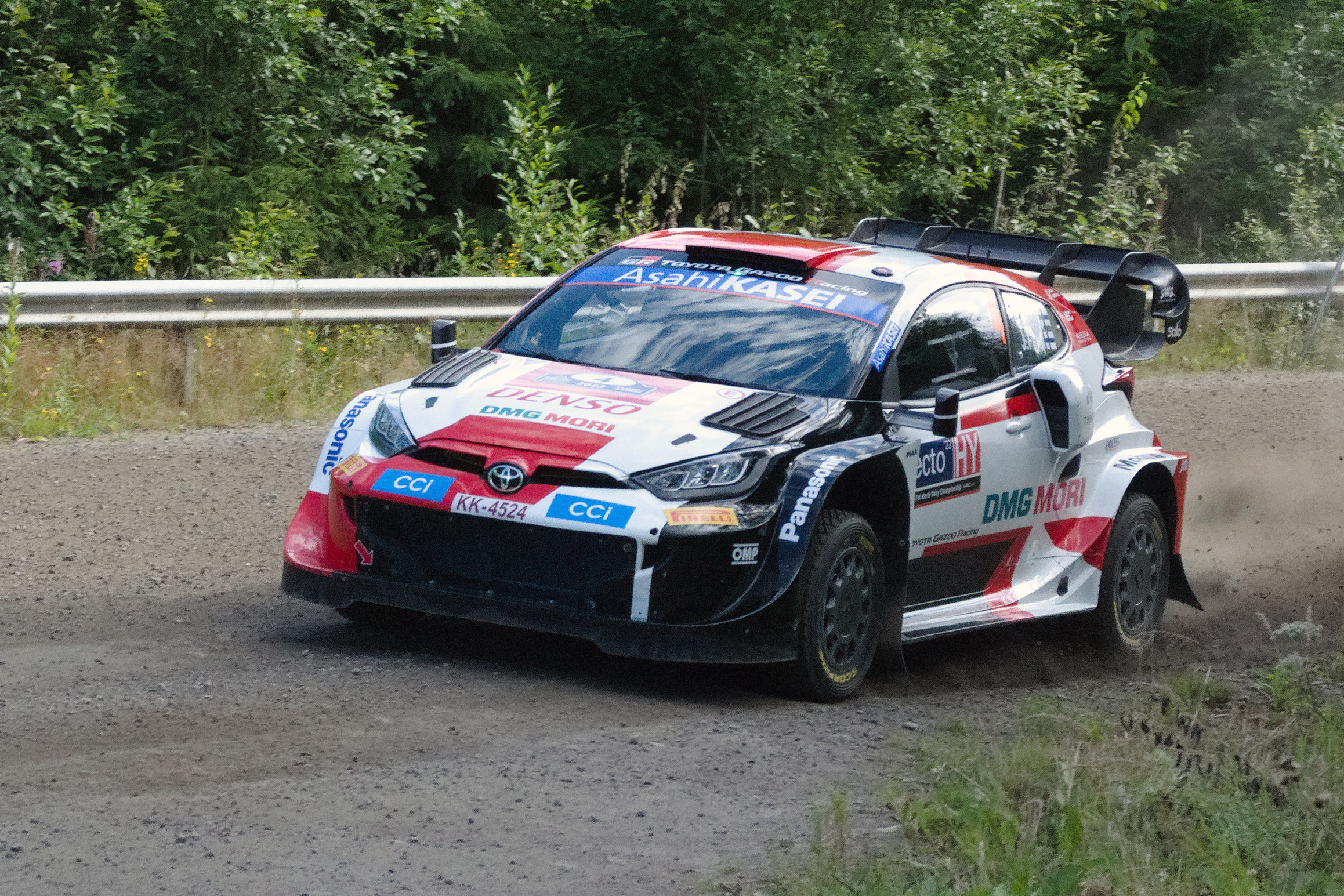
Esapekka Lappi with the GR Yaris Rally1 at Rally Finland 2022

The Toyota Gazoo Racing World Rally Team (TGR WRT) is based in Jyväskylä, Finland. The team was established and operated by an independent company, Tommi Mäkinen Racing, upon request of Toyota for their return to the championship in 2017. TGR Europe later purchased Tommi Mäkinen Racing and its assets in 2020, bringing the team under the manufacturer's control.

The TGR WRT operated Yaris WRC cars between 2017 and 2021, winning the championship for manufacturers twice in 2018 and 2021, and the drivers and co-driver champion titles in 2019 for Ott Tänak and Martin Järveoja; and Sébastien Ogier and Julien Ingrassia in 2020 and 2021. Since 2022, the team has operated hybrid GR Yaris Rally1 cars, winning a third manufacturer's championship in the cars first year, along with the driver and co-driver championship titles for Kalle Rovanperä and Jonne Halttunen.

Former rally drivers Jari-Matti Latvala and Juha Kankkunen are the team principals.

=== Sportscar racing ===
The GR010 Hybrid at the 2022 24 Hours of Le Mans

==== FIA World Endurance Championship ====
Toyota Gazoo Racing's entry in FIA World Endurance Championship is operated by TGR Europe and is operated from the company's headquarters in Cologne, Germany. TGR Europe was formerly known as Toyota Motorsport GmbH (TMG) prior to 2016.

Racing under the Toyota Gazoo Racing name since 2016, the team have won the World Endurance Championship four times, with wins at Le Mans three times with its LMP1 class TS050 Hybrid, and twice with the LMH GR010 Hybrid.

TGR Europe also enters the Nürburgring 24 Hours endurance race.

==== Super GT ====
Toyota Gazoo Racing announced the use of the Toyota Supra in the Japanese Super GT racing series from 2020 onwards. TGR partners with multiple race teams in the series, including TGR Team au TOM'S, TGR Team SARD, TGR Team WedsSport Bandoh, TGR Team KeePer TOM'S, TGR Team Wako's ROOKIE, and TGR Team ZENT Cerumo.

TGR Team au TOM'S has won the Super GT championship in the GT500 class four times, in 2021, 2023, 2024, and 2025.

==== Other ====
Toyota Gazoo Racing competes in the 24 Hours Nürburgring since 2007. it also supports customer teams in the Super Taikyu.

The GR86 is featured in one-make series including the GR86 Championship New Zealand, Toyota GR Cup Australia, Toyota GR Cup North America and Toyota GR Cup South Africa.

=== Rally-raid ===
Entries in both the Dakar Rally and FIA World Rally-Raid Championship under the global TGR name are operated by Toyota Gazoo Racing South Africa, an alias for independent local company, Hallspeed. The company entered rally-raids at home and internationally under the direction of Toyota South Africa from 2012 until 2019 when Nasser Al-Attiyah and Mathieu Baumel won the car class outright. Since 2020, the entry has been under the global Toyota Gazoo Racing name, with more support from the parent company. TGR also won Dakar in 2022 and 2023, with the inaugural World Rally-Raid Championship title in 2022 also.

Lithuanian driver Benediktas Vanagas and Estonian co-driver Kuldar Sikk also compete internationally under the name of Toyota Gazoo Racing Baltics with support from the local Toyota dealer.

=== National ===
In the United Kingdom, Speedworks Motorsport competes in the British Touring Car Championship as a factory-backed team since 2019, with the entry branded as Toyota Gazoo Racing UK since 2020. In Australia, the Toyota GR Supra competes in the Supercars Championship since 2026, with Walkinshaw TWG Racing as the factory-backed team and Brad Jones Racing as a customer team.

In Argentina, Toyota Gazoo Racing Argentina has a works team in the Turismo Competición 2000 since 2000. It also has factory-supported teams in the Top Race V6 since 2017, Turismo Nacional and Argentine Rally Championship since 2020, TC Pick Up since 2021, and Turismo Carretera since 2022. In Brazil, Toyota Gazoo has factory-supported teams in the Stock Car Brasil since 2020. In Uruguay, the brand competes in the Superturismo as a dealer team since 2018.

In the United States, Toyota Gazoo Racing created the GR Corolla RC2 in collaboration with Rallysport Services, to be entered in the American Rally Association National Championship.

=== Formula racing ===
==== Formula One ====
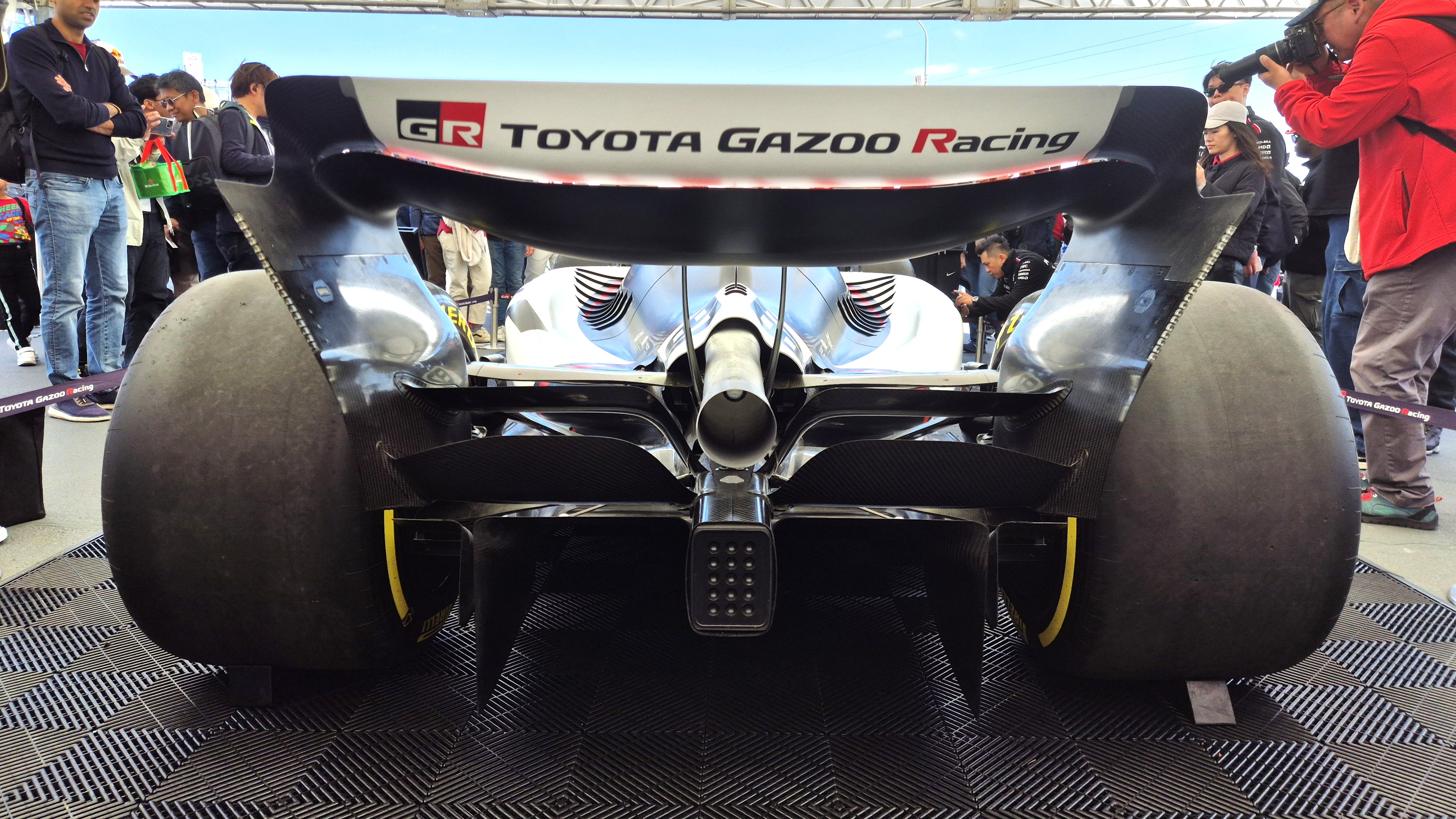
TGR logo on Haas VF-25 rear wing

On 11 October 2024, Toyota and Haas F1 Team announced a technical partnership whereby TGR will provide design, technical and manufacturing services whereas Haas will provide technical expertise and commercial benefits including TGR’s branding on the Haas cars. In the announcement, Toyota chairman Akio Toyoda stressed that the company is not making a comeback to the sport but to provide opportunities for its engineers, staff and drivers to experience Formula One. A few months later in January 2025, TGR director of global motorsport Masaya Kaji said that Toyota is looking into returning into Formula One. In December 2025, Haas and Toyota announced a title sponsorship with Haas entering the 2026 season as TGR Haas F1 Team. The title sponsorship name will remain for the season despite the company reverting as Gazoo Racing at the beginning of the year.

Toyota previously competed in Formula One from 2002 to 2009 as a factory team.

==== Super Formula ====
Toyota joined the Japanese Super Formula in 2006 as an engine supplier and team partner.

==== Lower formulae ====
The Formula Regional Oceania Trophy is a junior formula series held in New Zealand since 2005.

In 2025, Formula 2 and 3 team Hitech Grand Prix had a partnership with Toyota Gazoo Racing.

=== Sim racing ===
Toyota Gazoo Racing uses Gran Turismo 7 as a platform for virtual motorsports through the Gran Turismo World Series, and the Toyota Gazoo Racing GT Cup.

== Models ==
Gazoo Racing is involved in the creation of vehicles in three categories. GR models are bespoke vehicles, GR Sport models are sport trims of existing Toyota models, GR Parts models are sport accessories packs of existing Toyota models, and GRMN (Gazoo Racing, tuned by the Meister of the Nürburgring) models are the top-of-the-line, limited production conversions of existing models, including GR vehicles.

=== GR series ===
Model	Image	Introduced	Discontinued	Market(s)	Note(s)
GR86		2021	–	Global	A rebadged version of the Subaru BRZ
GR Corolla		2022	–	North America, Japan, Australia, New Zealand, Brazil, Thailand, Malaysia, South Africa, Indonesia, Philippines and Middle East	Not available in Europe
GR GT		2025	–	Global	Sold under Gazoo Racing branding without any Toyota badges
GR Supra		2019	2026	Global	Based on the BMW Z4 (G29)
GR Yaris		2020	–	Japan, Europe, Australia, New Zealand, South Africa, Thailand, Malaysia, Indonesia, Singapore, Philippines, Mexico, Argentina, Taiwan and Middle East	Not available in North America

=== GRMN series ===
Model	Year and number built	Market(s)
GT86 GRMN	2016 (100 units)	Japan
Century GRMN	2018 (2 black and white units, not for sale)	Japan
Century GRMN (SUV)	2023	Japan
GRMN Corolla	2027	Japan, North America, and Australia
iQ GRMN	2009 (100 units)	Japan
iQ GRMN Supercharged	2012 (100 units)	Japan
Mark X GRMN	2015 (100 units), 2019 (350 units)	Japan
Vitz GRMN Turbo	2013 (200 units)	Japan
Vitz GRMN	2018 (150 units)	Japan
Yaris GRMN	2018 (400 units)	Europe
GRMN Yaris	2022 (500 units)	Japan

=== GR Sport (GR-S) series ===
Model	Introduced	Market(s)
Agya GR Sport (A350)	2023	Indonesia
Aqua GR Sport (XP210)	2022	Japan
Aygo X GR Sport	2025	Europe
Corolla/Corolla Altis GR Sport/GR-S	2019	Europe, Thailand, Taiwan, Brazil, Argentina, China, The Philippines, Singapore, Malaysia, Indonesia
Corolla Cross GR Sport/GR-S	2021	Taiwan, Thailand, Philippines, Argentina, Brazil, South Africa, Indonesia, Malaysia, Japan, Europe, Australia
C-HR GR Sport (AX20)	2023	Europe, Australia
Fortuner/SW4 GR Sport/GR-S	2021	Indonesia, Thailand, The Philippines, Argentina, Brazil, India, Pakistan
Hilux/Hilux Revo GR Sport/GR-S	2019	Japan, South Africa, South America, Thailand, The Philippines, Europe, Indonesia, Australia, Malaysia, Pakistan, New Zealand
Land Cruiser GR Sport (J300)	2021	Japan, Middle East, Australia, New Zealand, South Africa, South America, Indonesia
Raize GR Sport (A250)	2021	Indonesia
RAV4 GR Sport (XA60)	2025	North America, Europe, Taiwan
Rush GR Sport/GR-S (F800)	2021	Indonesia, The Philippines
Vios GR-S (XP150)	2021	Malaysia, The Philippines
Vios / Yaris Ativ GR Sport (AC100)	2025	Thailand
Yaris GR Sport (XP150)	2021	Indonesia
Yaris GR Sport (XP210)	2022	Europe
Yaris Cross GR Sport (XP210)	2022	Japan, Europe, Australia, New Zealand

=== Former production models ===
Model	Introduced	Discontinued	Market(s)
86 GR Sport	2018	2020	Japan
86 GR	2018	2020	Japan
Agya GR Sport (B100)	2021	2023	Indonesia
Aqua GR Sport (NHP10)	2017	2021	Japan
Avanza Veloz GR Limited	2021	2021	Indonesia
Camry GR Sport	2021	2023	Russia, Kazakhstan
Copen GR Sport	2019	2026	Japan
C-HR GR Sport (AX10/AX50)	2019	2023	Japan, Europe, Australia, Thailand
Harrier GR Sport	2017	2020	Japan
Mark X GR Sport	2017	2019	Japan
Noah/Voxy GR Sport	2017	2021	Japan
Prius α GR Sport	2017	2021	Japan
Prius PHV GR Sport	2017	2022	Japan
RAV4 GR Sport (XA50)	2022	2025	Europe, Indonesia
Vitz GR Sport	2017	2020	Japan
Vitz GR	2017	2020	Japan
Yaris GR Sport (XP130)	2019	2020	Europe

=== Concept models ===
Model	Year
GR HV Sports Concept	2017
GR Super Sport Concept	2018
GR GT3 Concept	2022
bZ4X GR Sport Concept	2022
Prius 24h Le Mans Centennial GR Edition	2023
GR H2 Racing Concept	2023
FT-Se Concept	2023
GR LH2 Racing Concept	2025

== See also ==
- Toyota in motorsport
- Toyota Racing Development
- Toyota G Sports
