= Canadians for Health Research =

Canadian research organization

Canadian for Health Research
- Logo of CHR
- Abbreviation: CHR
- Type: Registered Charitable Organization
- Registration no.: 1144223147
- Legal status: dissolved
- Headquarters: Montreal, Quebec, Canada
- Official language: EN/FR

Canadians for Health Research (CHR; French: Les Canadiens pour la recherche médicale, CRM) was a registered national not-for-profit organisation founded in 1976.

On Saturday, November 12, 2017, the Annual General Meeting unanimously approved the dissolution of Canadians for Health Research (CHR/CRM) effective December 31, 2017.

== History ==
In 1976, the federal government froze the budget of the Medical Research Council of Canada (MRC) for that fiscal year. The response in Montreal was to organize a series of meetings to study the continuing problems of health research in Canada and to discover and discuss alternatives which could help rectify that immediate funding crisis. With the active participation of voluntary agencies, concerned citizens and members of the scientific community, a new voluntary organization was conceived. In February 1976, Canadians for Health Research (CHR) was founded.

== Board of directors ==
President from 1979 to 2017, Patricia Guyda was instrumental in the creation of the Organisation. Guyda dedicated herself to promoting high quality health care research and received multiple awards during her career: Order of Canada; Canadian Society for Clinical Investigation Distinguished Service Award, Partners in Research Ronald G. Calhoun Science Ambassador Award; Gordon Kaplan Award.

== See also ==
- PolyAnalytik
