= Toyota C-HR =

Subcompact crossover SUV

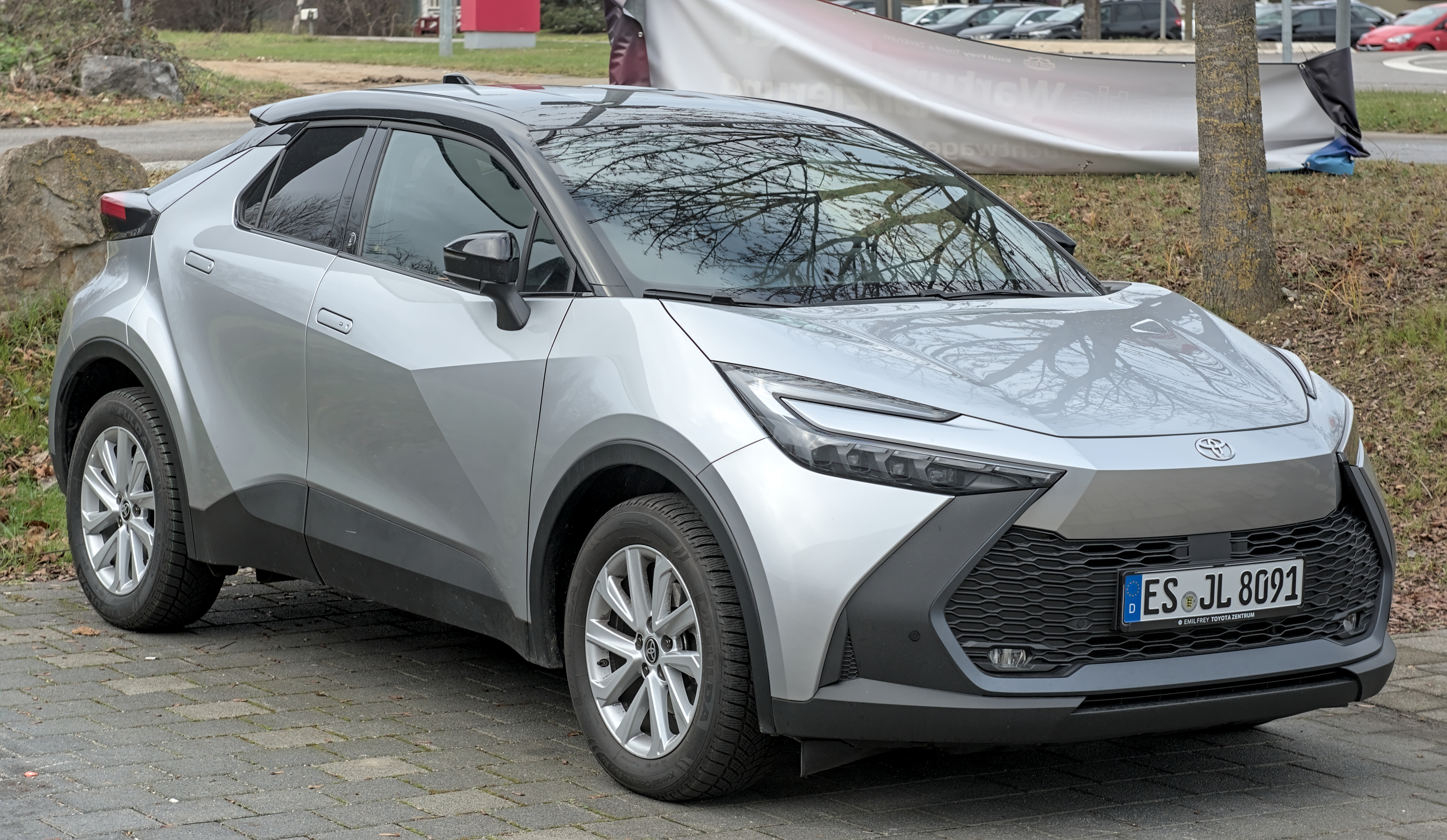
- Toyota C-HR 1.8 Hybrid (ZYX20, Europe)

Overview
- Manufacturer: Toyota
- Also called: Toyota IZOA (FAW Toyota; China, 2018–2024)
- Production: 2016–present

Body and chassis
- Class: Subcompact crossover SUV
- Body style: 5-door SUV
- Layout: Front-engine, front-wheel-drive; Front-engine, four-wheel-drive
- Platform: TNGA: GA-C

The Toyota C-HR (Japanese: トヨタ C-HR, Hepburn: Toyota Shīeichiāru) is a subcompact crossover SUV manufactured and marketed by Japanese automaker Toyota since 2016. Since 2020, it is positioned between the Yaris Cross and Corolla Cross in Toyota's crossover SUV range.

The first-generation C-HR was available in many regions, including Japan, China, North America, Europe, Southeast Asia, and Australasia, and was produced in four countries. Since the release of the second-generation C-HR in 2023, availability of the C-HR has been limited to Europe and Australia, with production centralised in Turkey. The Corolla Cross, released in 2020, has largely taken over the model's positioning outside Europe.

== First generation (AX10/AX50; 2016) ==
First generation
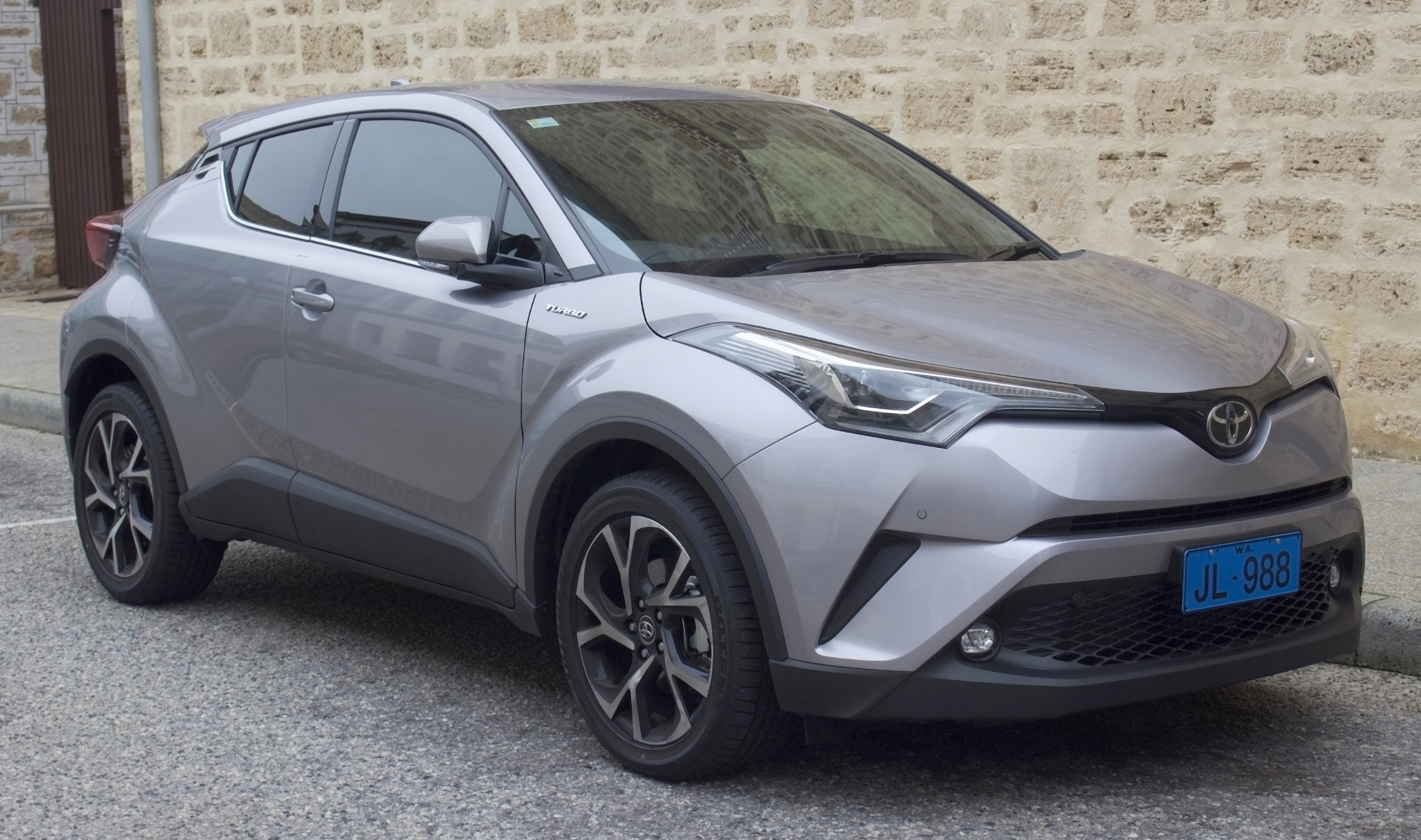
- Pre-facelift Toyota 1.2 C-HR Koba 2WD (NGX10, Australia)

Overview
- Model code: AX10; AX50
- Also called: Toyota IZOA (FAW Toyota; China)
- Production: November 2016 – September 2023; 2018–2025 (China)
- Model years: 2018-2022 (North America)
- Assembly: Japan: Kanegasaki (TMEJ); China: Guangzhou (GAC Toyota); Tianjin (FAW Toyota); Turkey: Sakarya (TMMT); Thailand: Chachoengsao (TMT)
- Designer: Ian Cartabiano, Katsuhiro Suzuki and Kazuhiro Sato

Body and chassis
- Layout: Front-engine, front-wheel-drive; Front-engine, four-wheel-drive (1.2 L CVT)
- Related: Lexus UX; Toyota Corolla Cross; Toyota Corolla (E210); Toyota Prius (XW50); Toyota Prius PHV/Prime (XW50)

Powertrain
- Engine: Petrol: 1197 cc 8NR-FTS turbo I4 (NGX10/50); 1798 cc 2ZR-FE I4 (ZGX11); 1986 cc 3ZR-FAE I4 (ZGX10; North America); 1986 cc M20A-FKS I4 (MAXA10); 1986 cc M20C-FKS I4 (MAXA10; China); 1986 cc M20E-FKS I4 (MAXA10; IZOA); Petrol flex-fuel: 1798 cc 2ZR-FBE I4 (ZGX11); Petrol hybrid: 1798 cc 2ZR-FXE I4 (ZYX10/11); 1986 cc M20A-FXS I4 (MAXH10; Europe); 1986 cc M20B/G-FXS I4 (MAXH10; IZOA Hybrid); 1986 cc M20F-FXS I4 (MAXH10; China)
- Electric motor: 150 kW (201 hp; 204 PS) 4KM synchronous (C-HR/IZOA EV)
- Transmission: 1.2L：6-speed manual (EG60); 1.2L&1.8L：7-speed simulated CVT (K313); 1.8L&2.0L：eCVT (hybrid); 2.0L：Direct Shift- CVT (K114)
- Hybrid drivetrain: Power-split hybrid (C-HR Hybrid)
- Battery: 1.3 kW·h Nickel–metal hydride (Hybrid); 54.3 kW·h lithium-ion (C-HR/IZOA EV)
- Plug-in charging: 6.6 kW AC, 50 kW DC (C-HR/IZOA EV)

Dimensions
- Wheelbase: 2,640 mm (103.9 in)
- Length: 4,360–4,385 mm (171.7–172.6 in)
- Width: 1,795 mm (70.7 in)
- Height: 1,565 mm (61.6 in)
- Curb weight: 1,380–1,460 kg (3,042–3,219 lb)

=== Concept model ===
The Toyota C-HR was first previewed by the Scion C-HR Concept, and then the Toyota C-HR Concept.

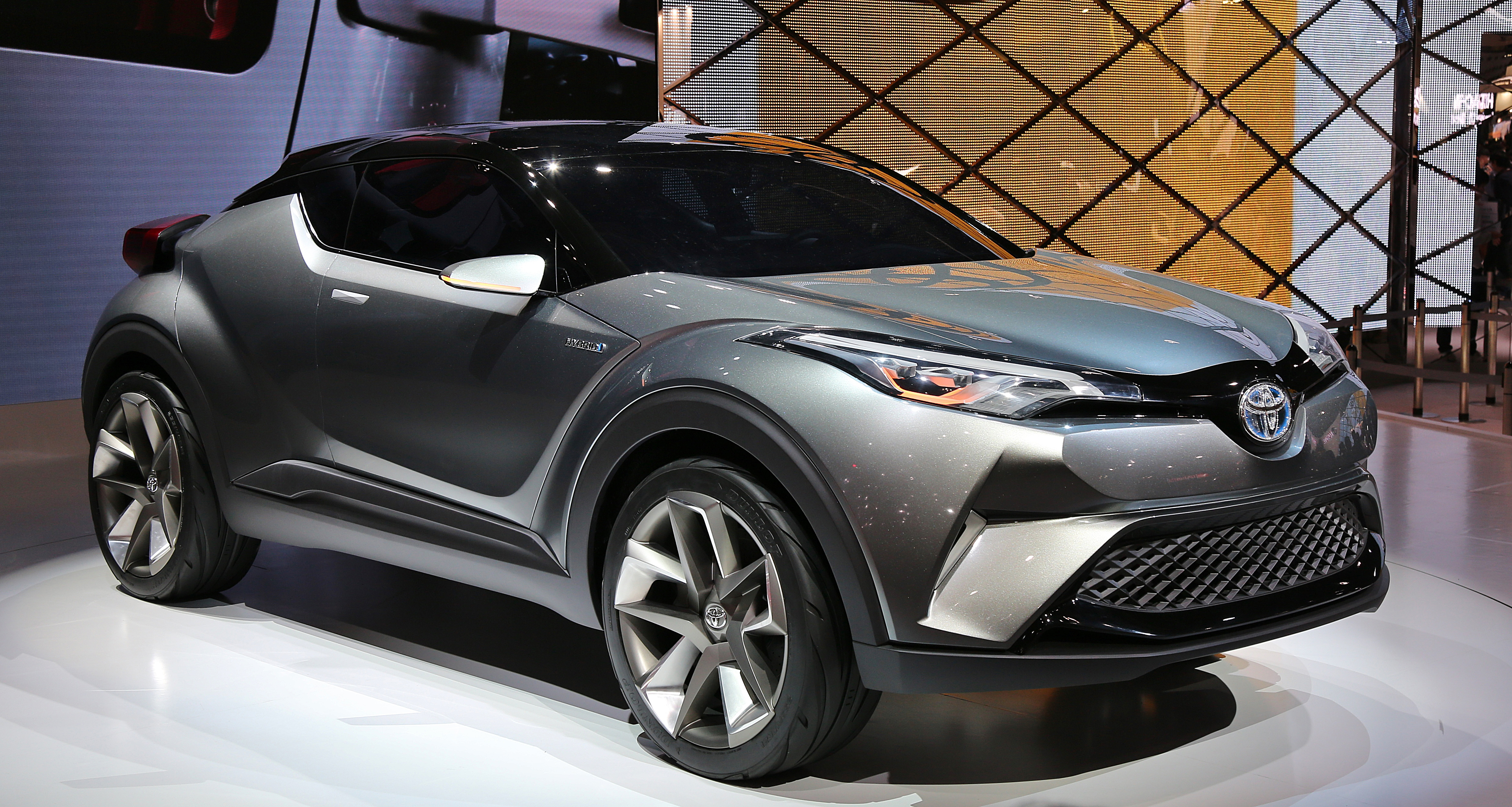
Toyota C-HR Concept

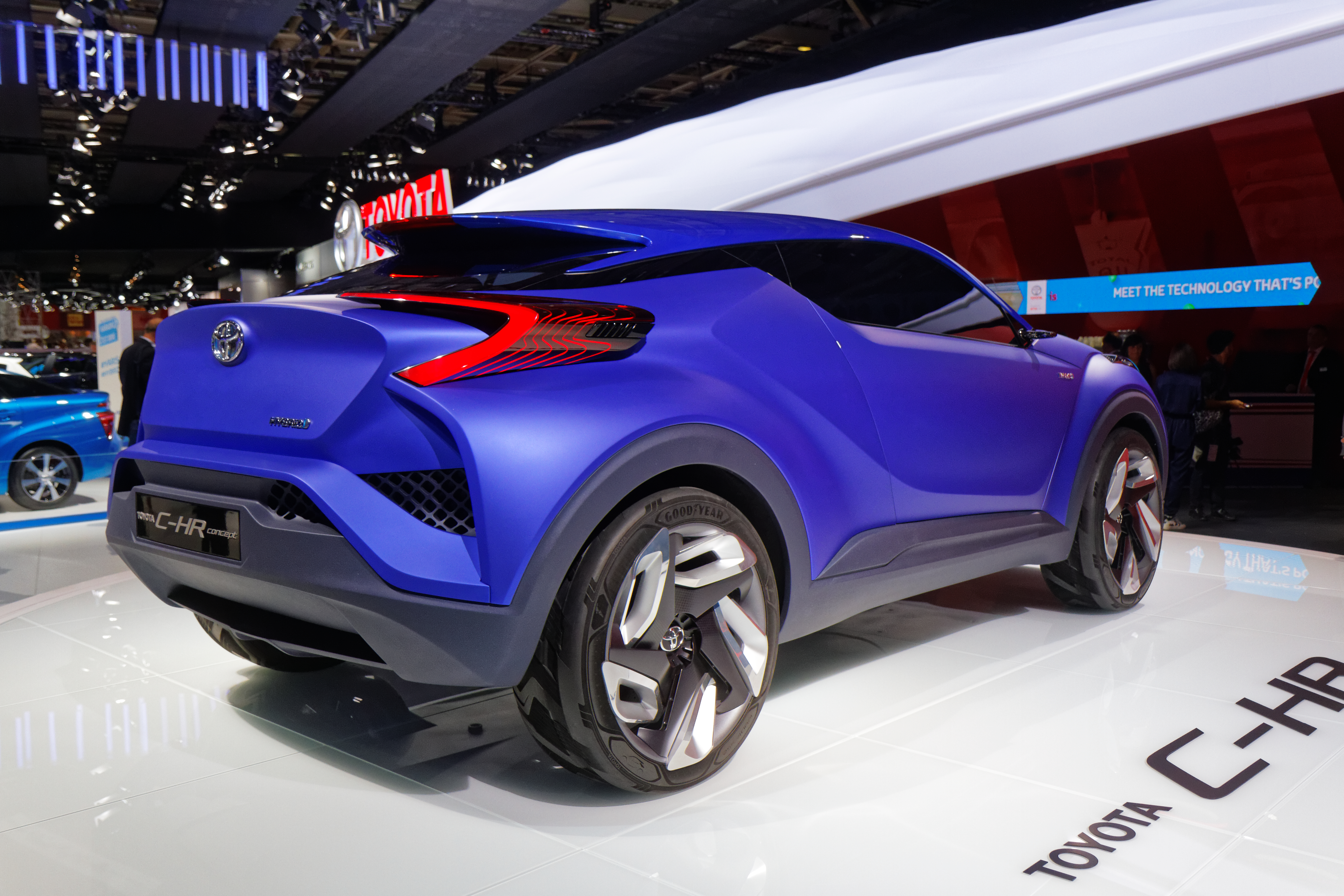
Toyota C-HR Concept

=== Production model ===
Toyota presented the production C-HR at the March 2016 Geneva Motor Show and started production in November 2016. It was launched in Japan on 14 December 2016. It went on sale in Europe, Australia, South Africa and North America in early 2017, and in Southeast Asia, China and Taiwan in 2018. The name C-HR can stand for either Compact High Rider, Cross Hatch Run–about or Coupe High Rider.

The development of the car began in 2013, led by Toyota chief engineer Hiroyuki Koba, sharing the TNGA-C (GA-C) platform with the E210 series Corolla.

Initial production was in Japan and Turkey. The 2018–2020 model year North American-spec C-HR is imported from Turkey.

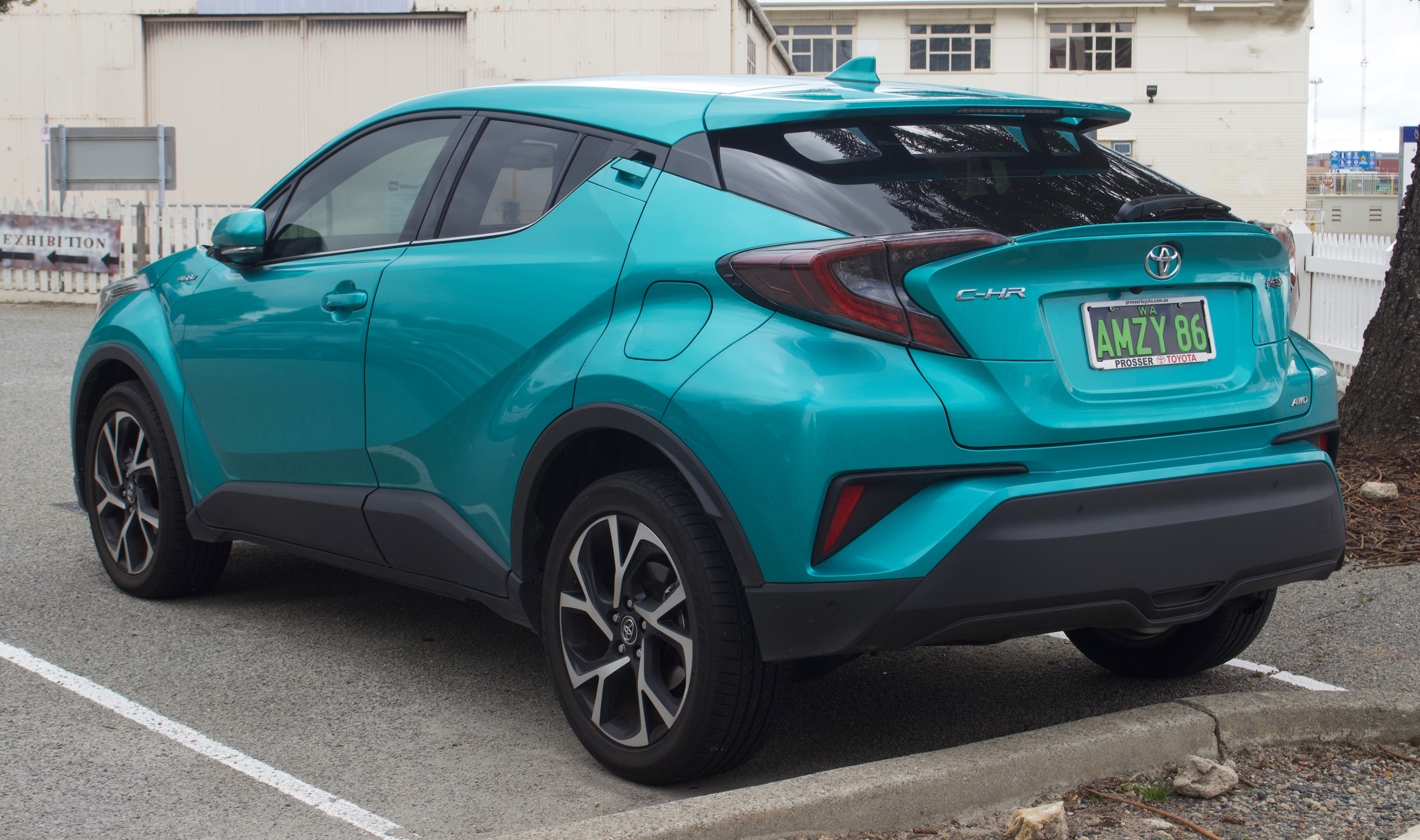
Pre-facelift Toyota C-HR 1.2 Koba AWD (NGX50, Australia)

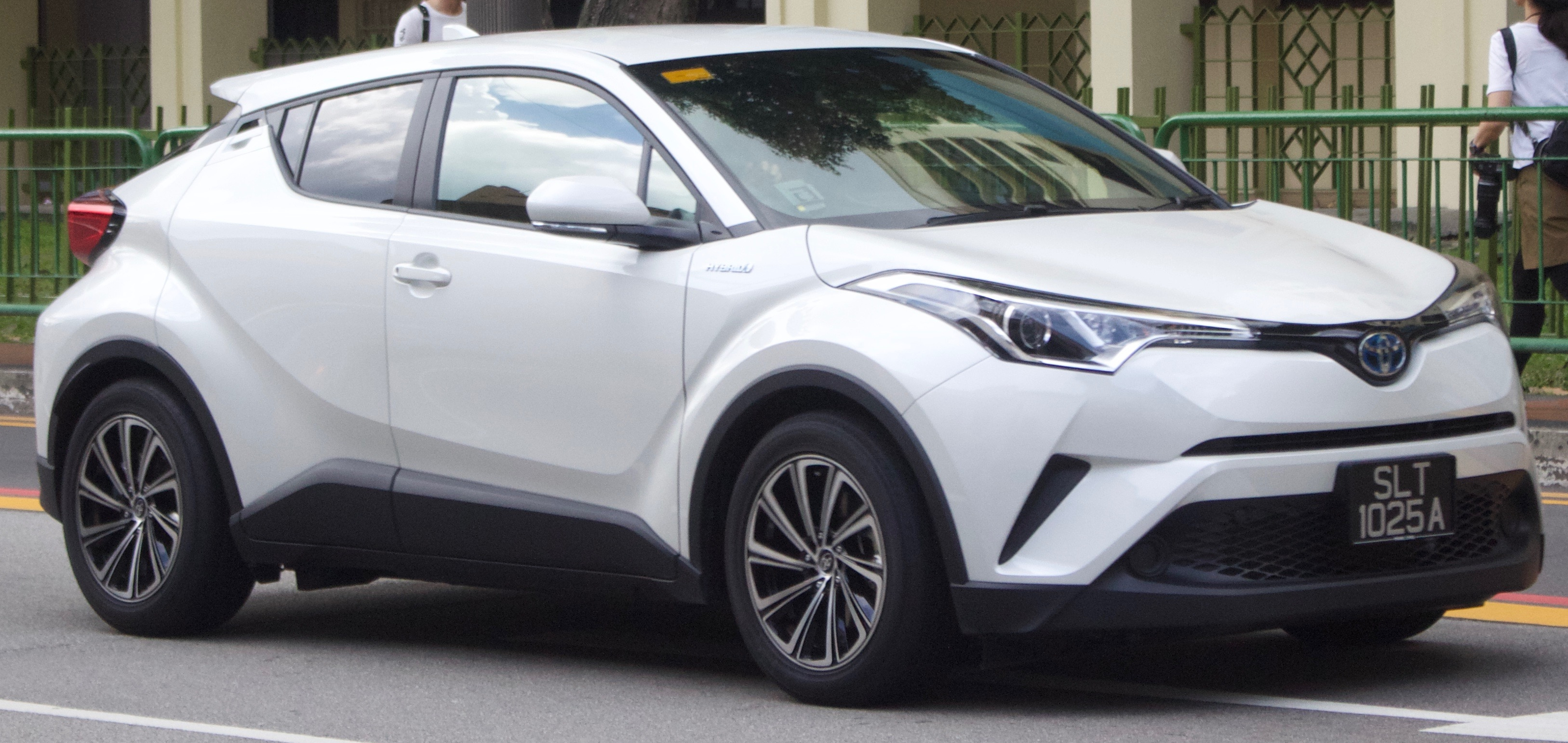
2017 Toyota C-HR 1.8 Hybrid (ZYX10, Singapore)

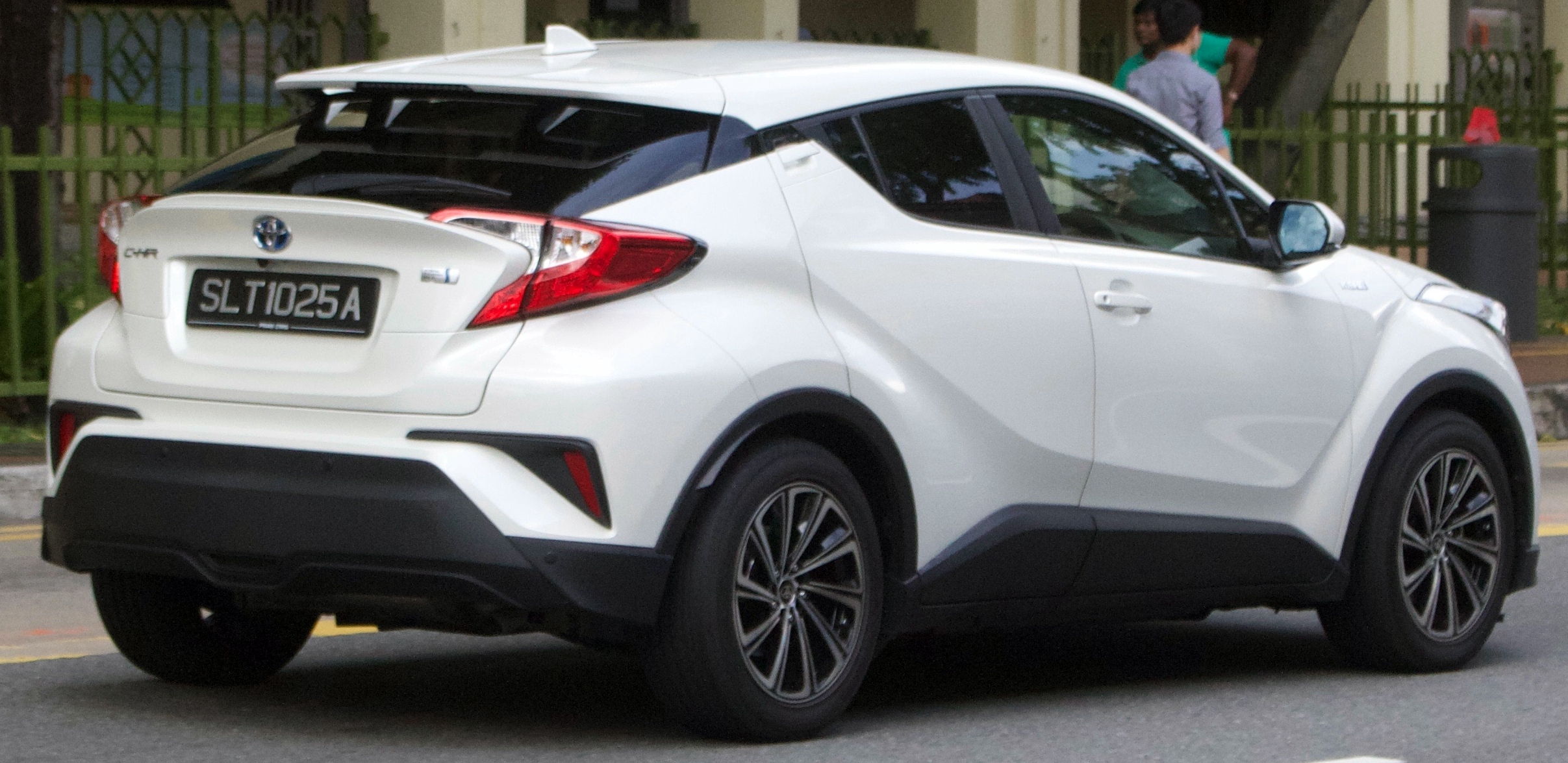
2017 Toyota C-HR 1.8 Hybrid (ZYX10, Singapore)

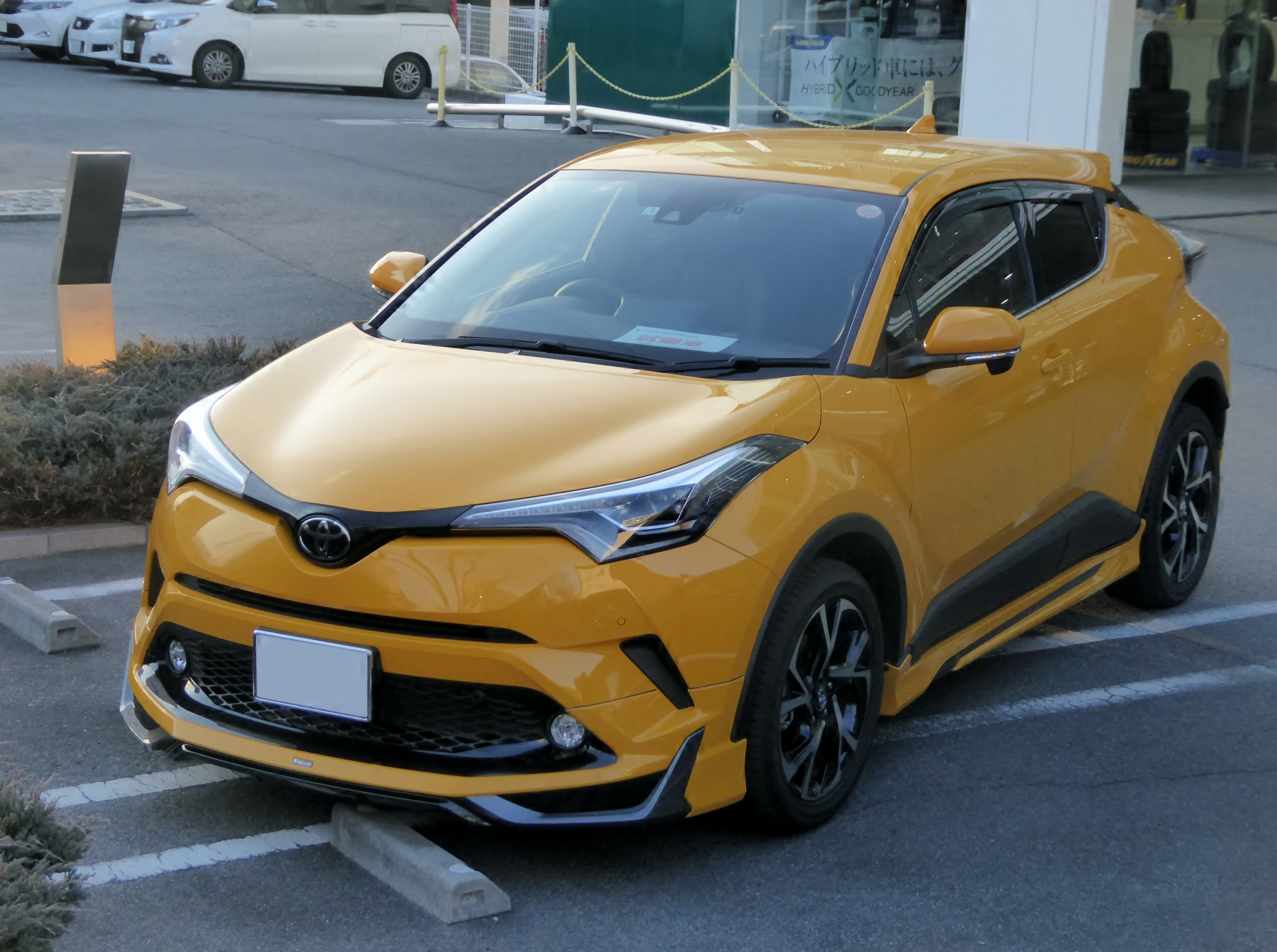
Toyota C-HR 1.2 G-T AWD with optional TRD body kit (NGX50, Japan)

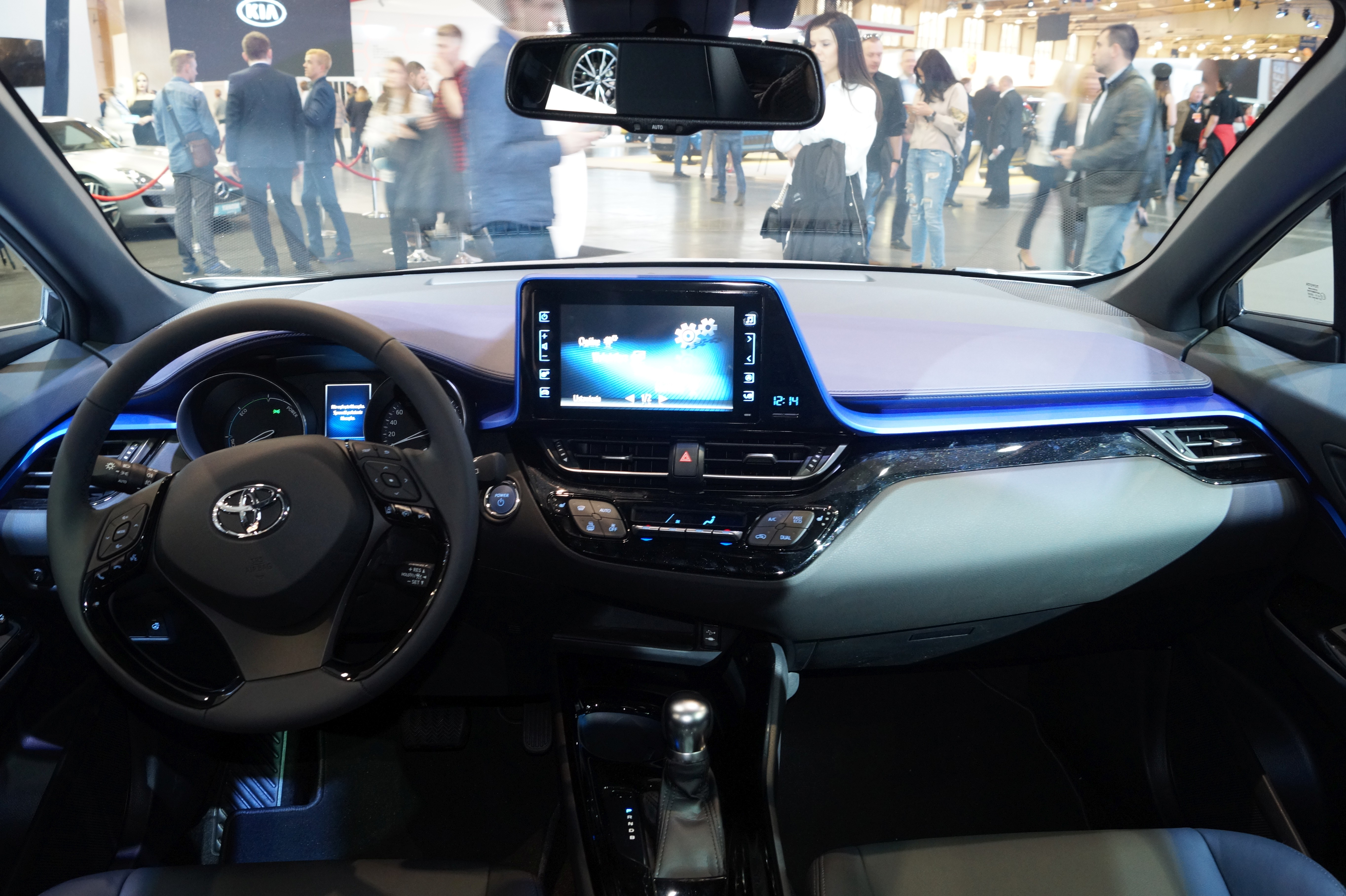
Interior

==== Japan ====
In Japan, the C-HR is sold at all Toyota dealership sales channels (Toyota Store, Toyopet Store, Toyota Corolla Store and Netz Store). The Japanese market C-HR is powered by either 1.2-litre turbocharged petrol engine, or 1.8-litre Hybrid. The FWD models are available with both engines, while the only engine for the AWD models is the 1.2-litre turbo. Model grades are S, S-LED, G, S-T and G-T. Models S, S-LED, G are powered with a 1.2-litre turbo engine, while other models by a 1.8-litre Hybrid. LED Package is exclusive for the G and S-LED packages.

==== Asia ====
The Thai-built C-HR with 1.8-litre 2ZR-FBE or 2ZR-FE engine is sold in certain Asian countries such as Thailand, Indonesia, Malaysia and Brunei. The ASEAN production version was unveiled in Thailand on 30 November 2017, at the 34th Thailand International Motor Expo.

For the Indonesian market, the C-HR was launched on 10 April 2018, initially with a 1.8-litre 2ZR-FE petrol engine. The hybrid variant followed later on 22 April 2019. The petrol variant was discontinued in March 2022. The remaining sole hybrid variant received Toyota Safety Sense on 27 May 2022 and sold until May 2023.

In Brunei, the C-HR was launched in early 2018 and offered in the mid and high grade models with a petrol engine, and a hybrid model. It was discontinued in 2022.

For Taiwan, the C-HR is only offered with 1.2-litre 8NR-FTS petrol engine. Buyers in Taiwan can choose the FWD and AWD models.

In Singapore, it received the FWD model in Active and Luxury grades by the local distributor with the 1.2-litre engine while hybrid 1.8-litre models are offered by parallel importers.

For the Chinese market, the C-HR is sold by GAC Toyota, while its twin model sold by FAW Toyota is called the IZOA (Chinese: 奕泽; pinyin: Yìzé). The IZOA features a front bumper grille with horizontal lines instead of mesh on the C-HR. Both the C-HR and IZOA were revealed at the Auto Guangzhou in November 2017 and went on sale in April 2018. The electric vehicle (EV) variant of both the C-HR and IZOA were unveiled at the 18th Auto Shanghai on 16 April 2019, as the first battery electric vehicle in Toyota's upcoming lineup.

The C-HR EV went on sale in China in April 2020. The electric motor produces 150 kW (201 hp; 204 PS) and 300 N⋅m (220 lb⋅ft) of torque. The 54.3 kWh lithium-ion battery pack is claimed to deliver a range of up to 400 km (250 miles) as per NEDC.

In late 2020, the comparatively expensive (being a fully imported model from Thailand) C-HR was discontinued in Malaysia, leading to declining sales. It was replaced by the Corolla Cross, launched in late March 2021.

==== Europe ====
As in Japan, the C-HR for Europe can be purchased with either 1.2-litre turbocharged petrol, a 1.8-litre hybrid or with 2.0-litre hybrid. 6-speed manual transmission is only installed in the front-wheel-drive 1.2-litre turbo; the sole gearbox for the 1.2-litre turbo AWD and the hybrid is a CVT.

Trim levels vary across countries. In the UK, they are Icon, Design, Excel and Dynamic. For the French market, there are even more marketing name variations such as Active, Dynamic, Edition, Graphic, Distinctive and Collection. In Romania there are C-enter, C-ult Style and C-lassy. They are essentially similar cars with different standards or optional equipment.

==== Australia ====
For the Australian market (imported from Japan), the C-HR is only offered with the 1.2-litre, 8NR-FTS turbo motor. The base model is available in manual transmission as a FWD only, automatic transmission models may be FWD or AWD. The high level Koba model is available in both FWD and AWD variants. The gearbox for the base model is a choice of 6-speed manual transmission or CVT with 7-speed simulated gear. The Koba comes with CVT only, and is equipped with LED headlights, leather seats, heated front seats, and smart entry and start system.

==== North America ====
Unique for the North American C-HR is the larger 2.0-litre 3ZR-FAE naturally aspirated petrol engine which is matched to a CVT gearbox. In North America, the C-HR was originally planned to be marketed under the Scion brand, before Toyota discontinued the marque. The 2018 model year was available in either the XLE or XLE Premium trim levels. Beginning with the 2019 model year, the C-HR was available in LE, XLE, XLE Premium or Limited trim levels.

The C-HR was discontinued in North America after the 2022 model year, where Toyota elected not to market the subsequent, second-generation C-HR, and the Corolla Cross continued as the brand's subcompact crossover/SUV.

==== Argentina ====
The C-HR was launched in Argentina in December 2020 only equipped by the hybrid 1.8 engine. It was only sold in HEV trim level with a CVT gearbox.

The C-HR was discontinued in Argentina in December 2023 along with the Camry.

=== Facelift ===
The facelifted C-HR was unveiled in Japan, Europe, Australia, and North America in October 2019. The European model received the 2.0-litre M20A-FXS hybrid engine option for the first time. Android Auto and Apple CarPlay became standard. The GR Sport variant is also offered.

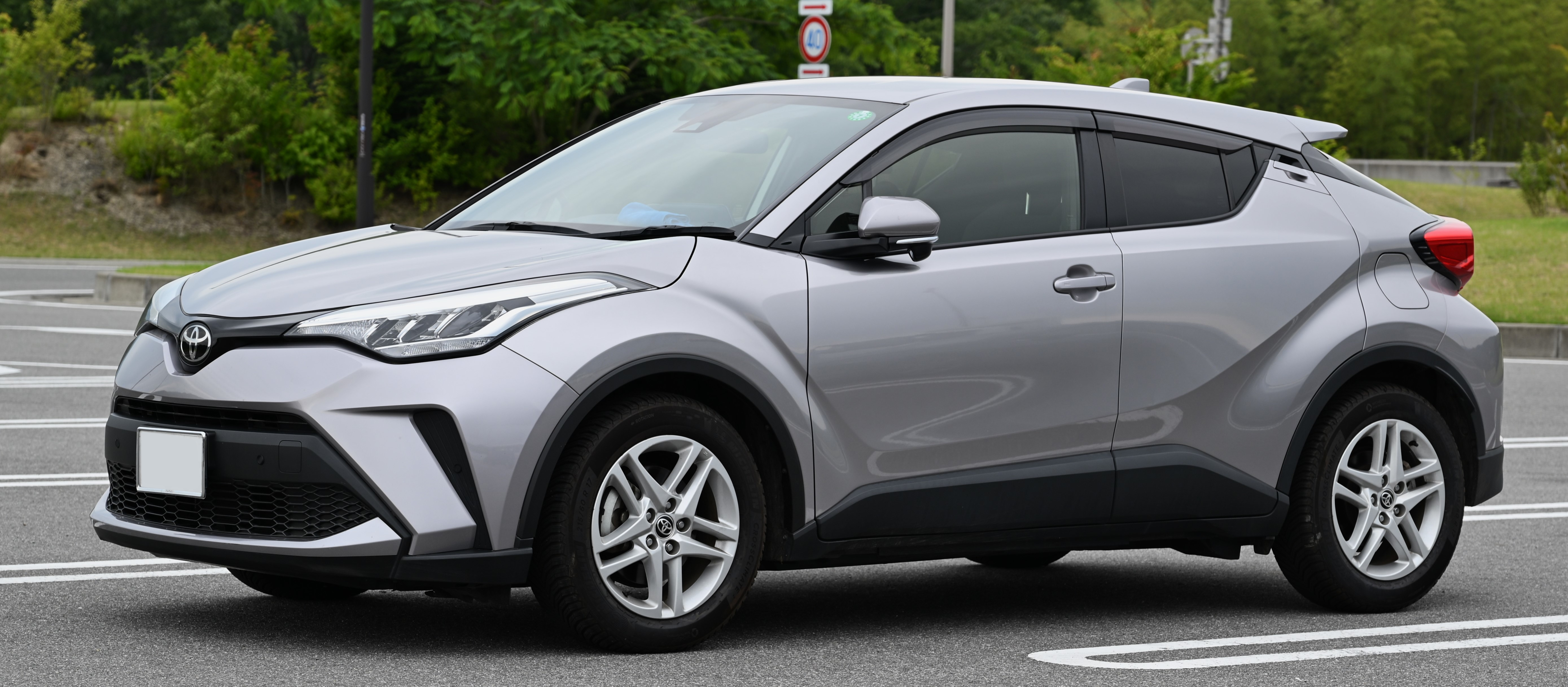
Facelift Toyota C-HR ST (Japan)

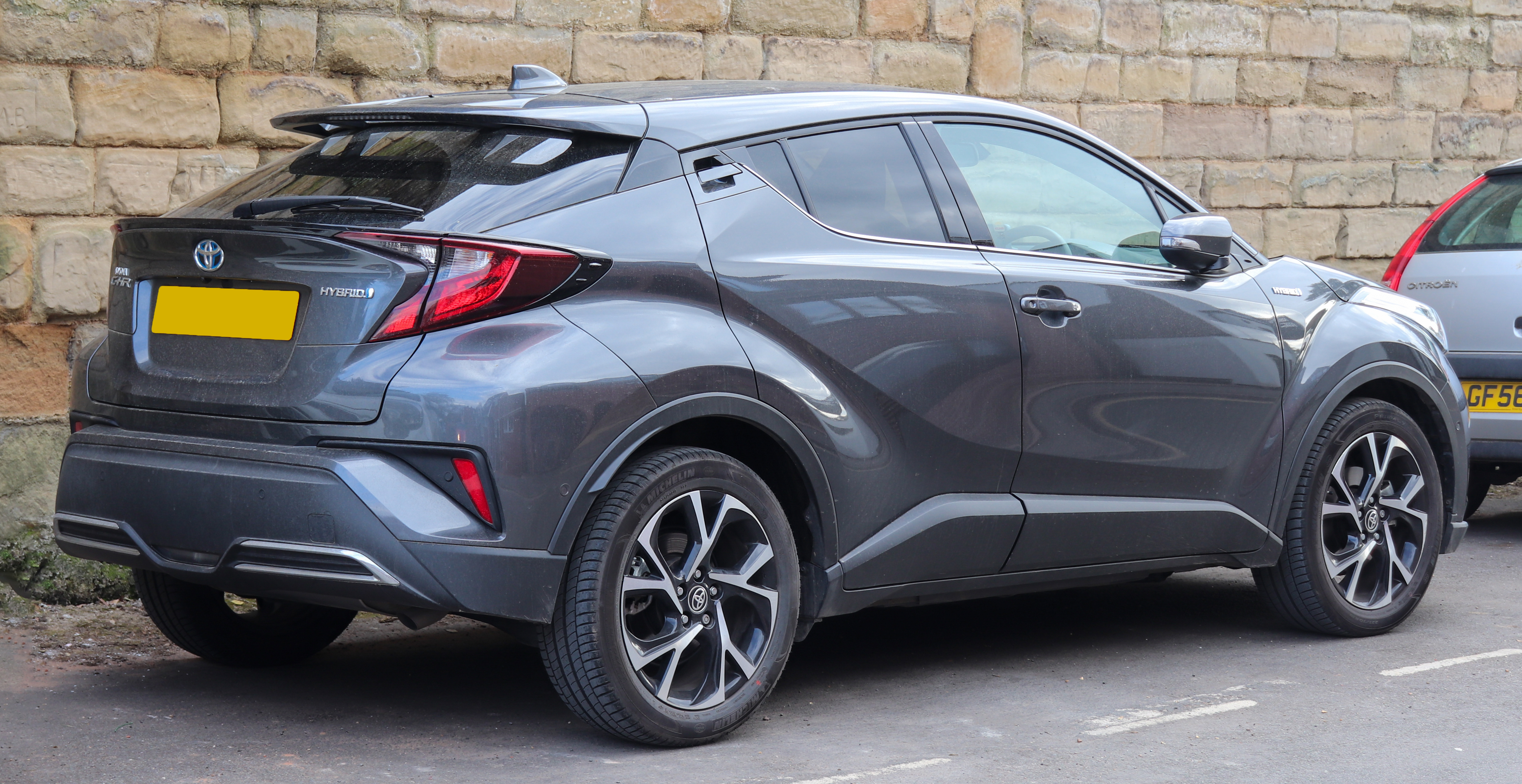
2020 Toyota C-HR Design 2.0 Hybrid (MAXH10, UK)

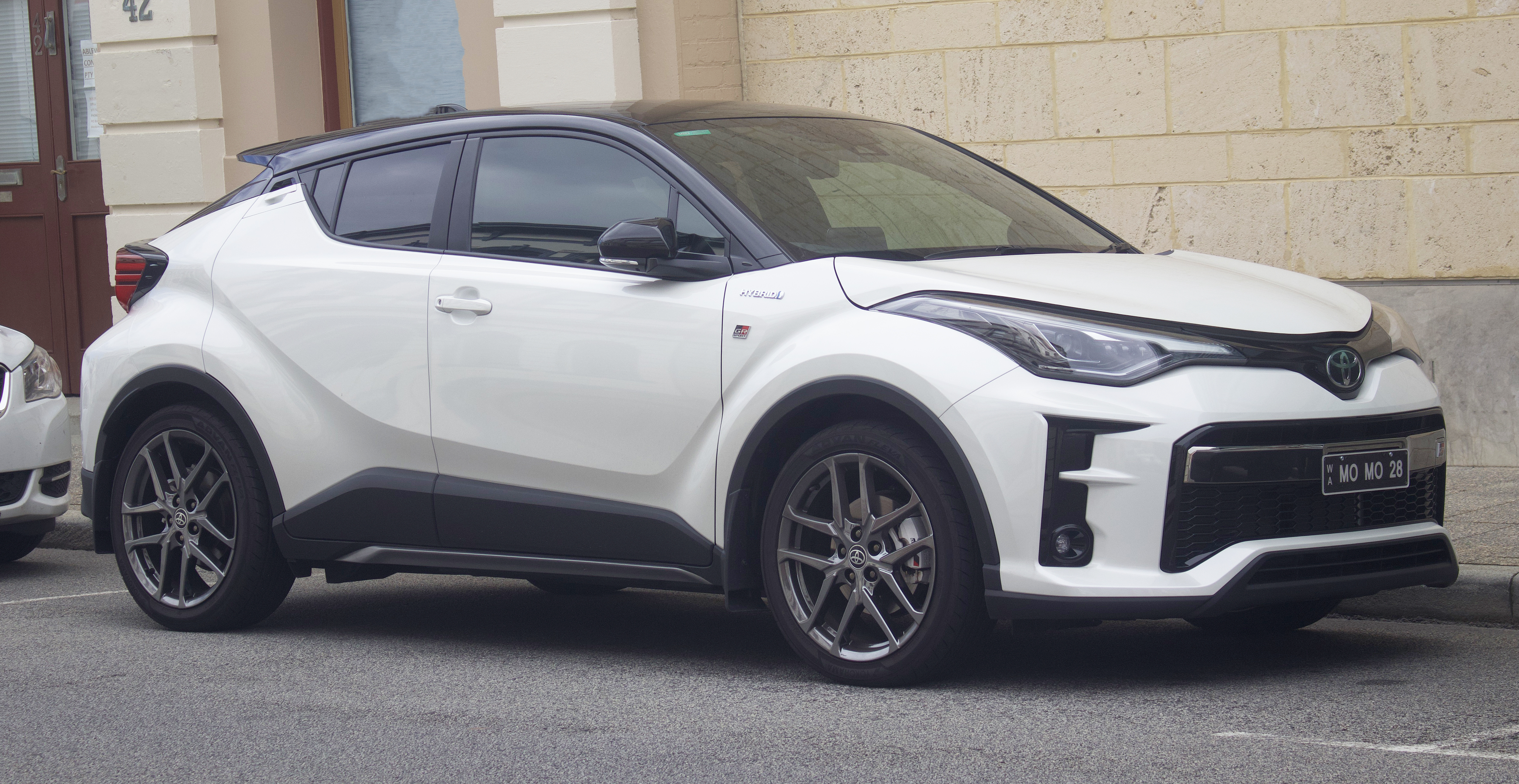
Facelift Toyota C-HR GR Sport Hybrid (Australia)

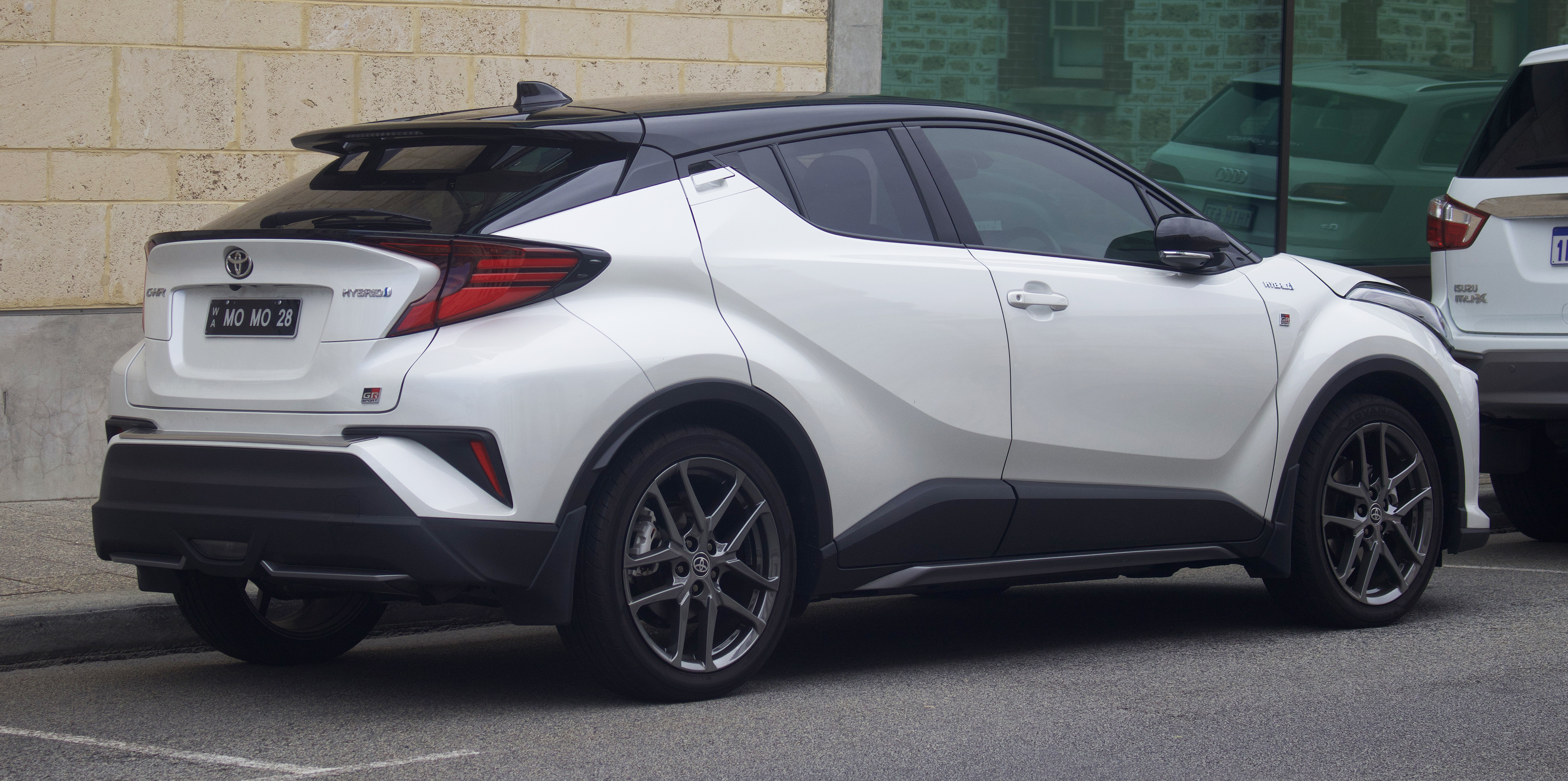
Facelift Toyota C-HR GR Sport Hybrid (Australia)

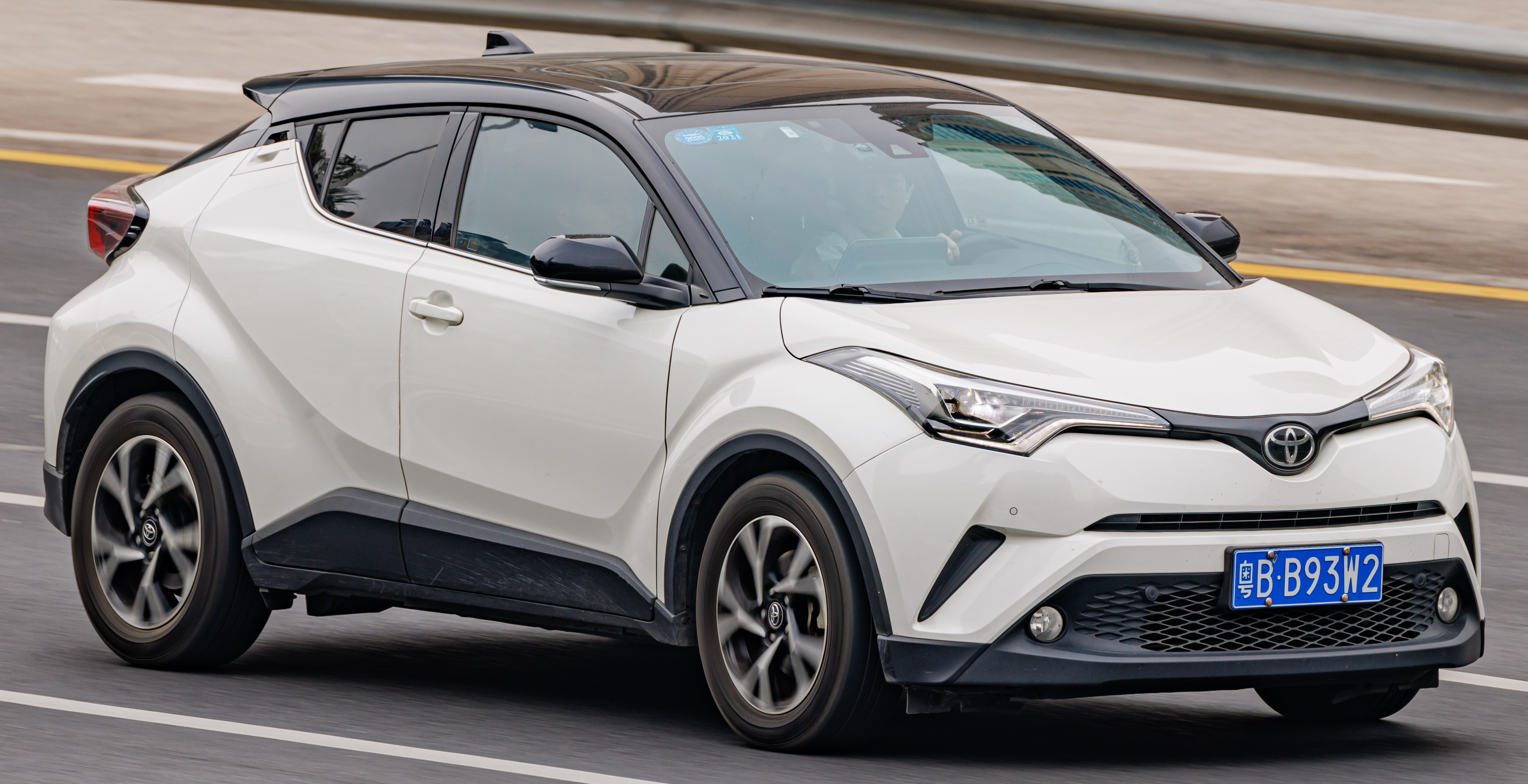
GAC Toyota C-HR

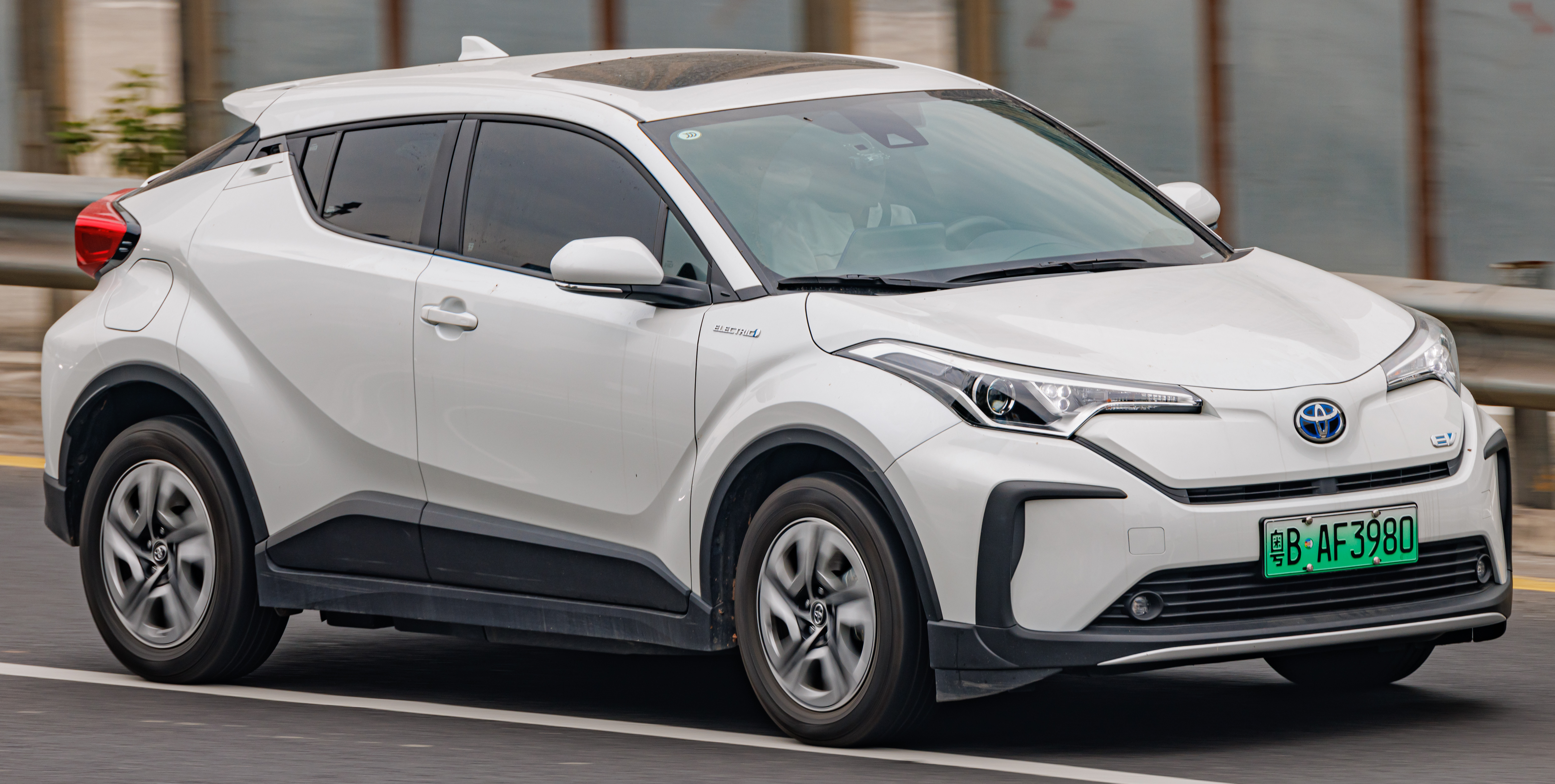
GAC Toyota C-HR EV (China)

==== IZOA ====
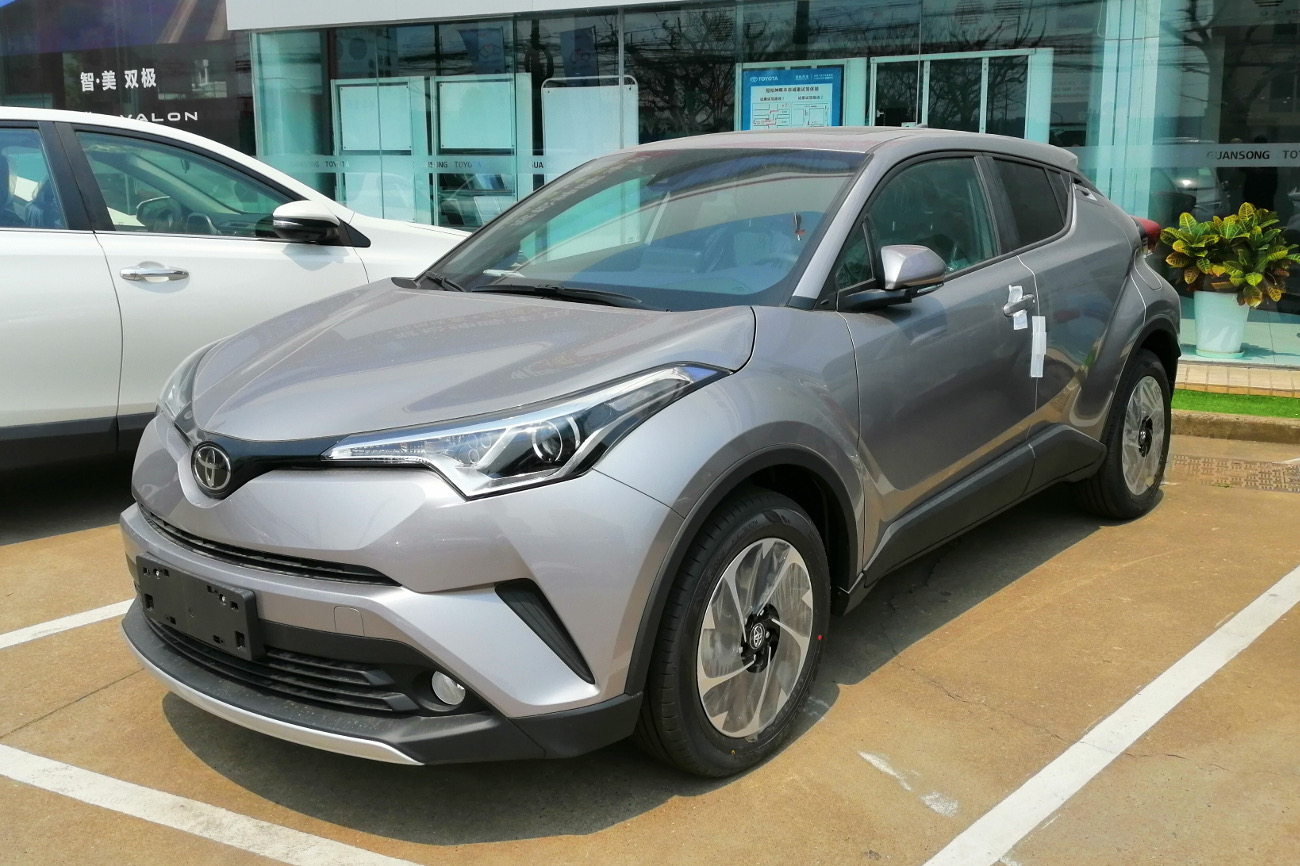
Pre-facelift FAW Toyota IZOA (China)

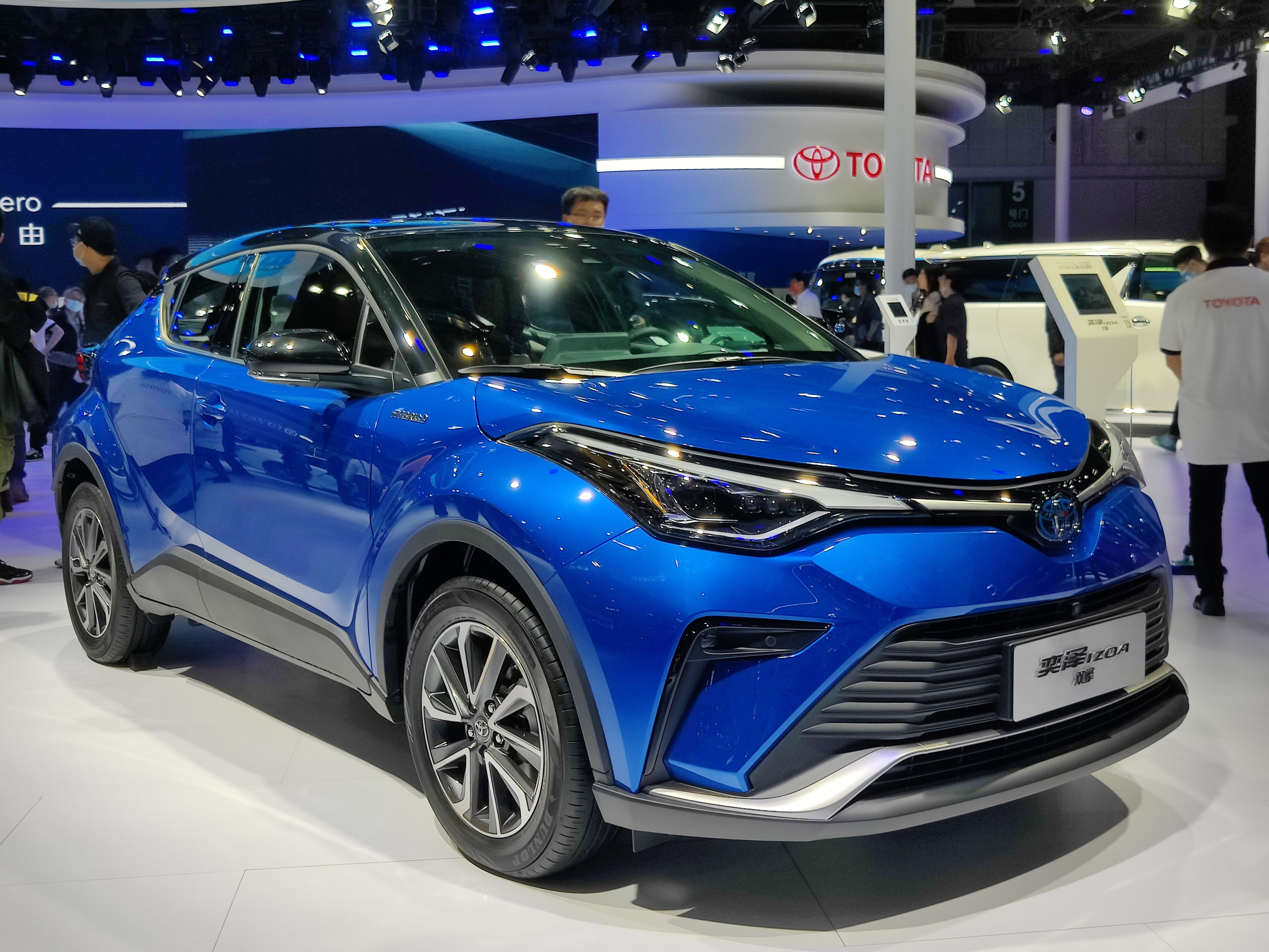
Facelift IZOA Hybrid (China)

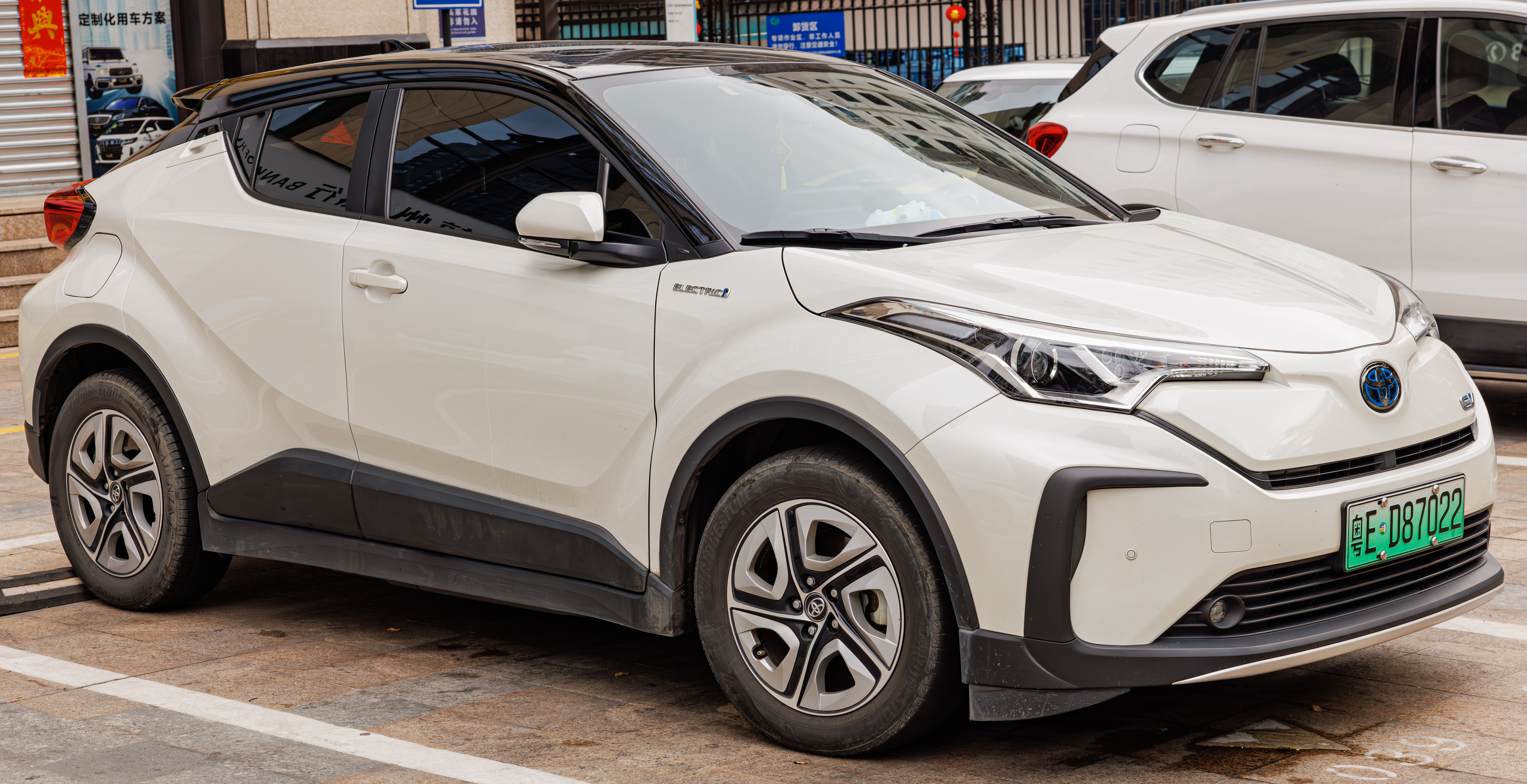
IZOA EV (China)

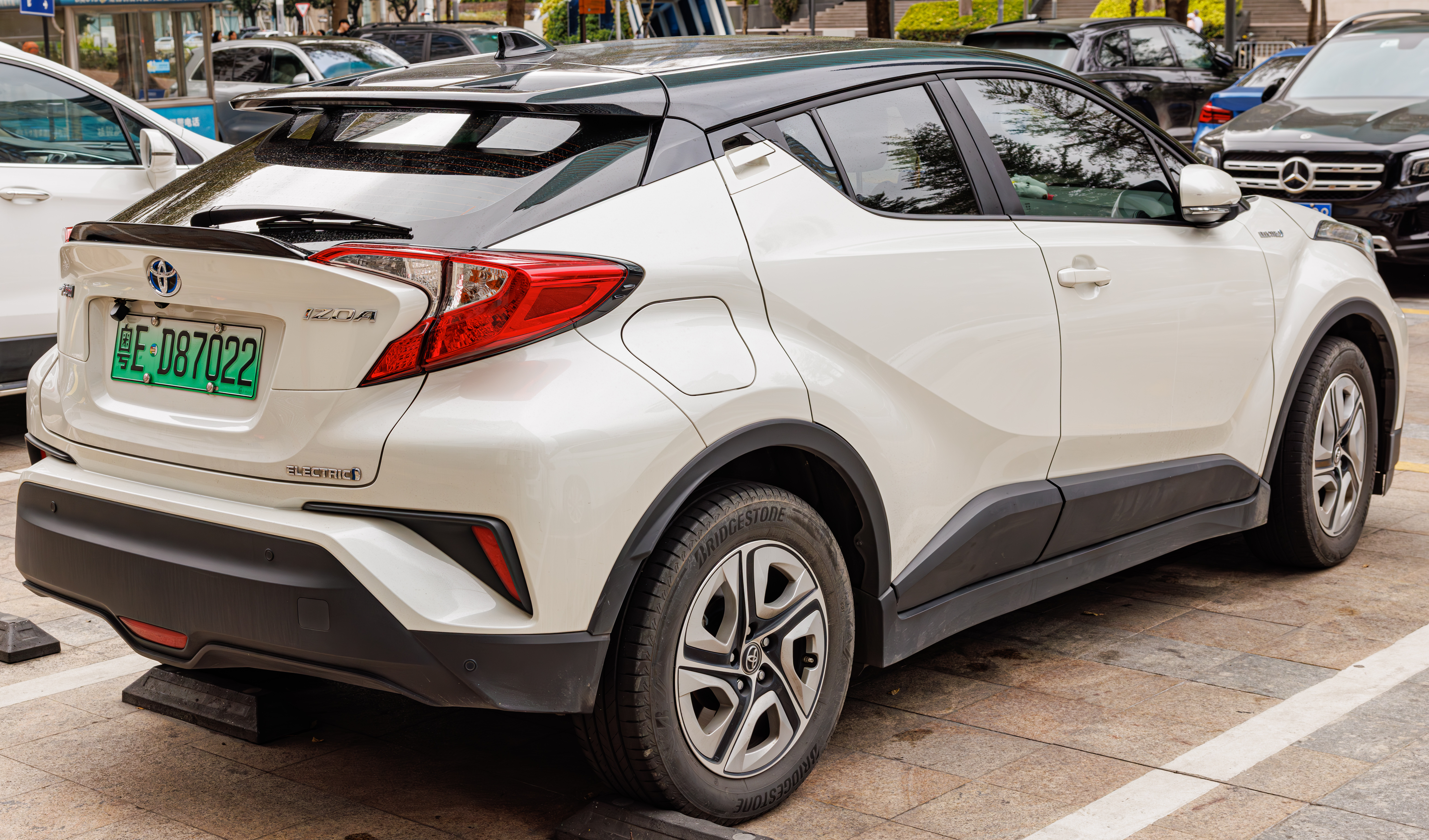
IZOA EV (China)

=== Safety ===
==== Euro NCAP ====
Euro NCAP test results* Toyota C-HR Hybrid (2017)
Test	Points	%
Overall:	5 /5 stars	
Adult occupant:	36.2	95%
Child occupant:	38	77%
Pedestrian:	32.2	78%
Safety assist:	9.4	64%

==== ANCAP ====
ANCAP test results* Toyota C-HR (2017, aligned with Euro NCAP)
Test	Points	%
Overall:	5 /5 stars	
Adult occupant:	33.1	87%
Child occupant:	38	77%
Pedestrian:	27.4	65%
Safety assist:	8.1	68%

==== ASEAN NCAP ====
ASEAN NCAP test results Toyota C-HR (2018)
Test	Points
Overall:	5 /5 stars
Adult occupant:	49.72
Child occupant:	20.86
Safety assist:	20.73

== Second generation (AX20; 2023) ==
Second generation
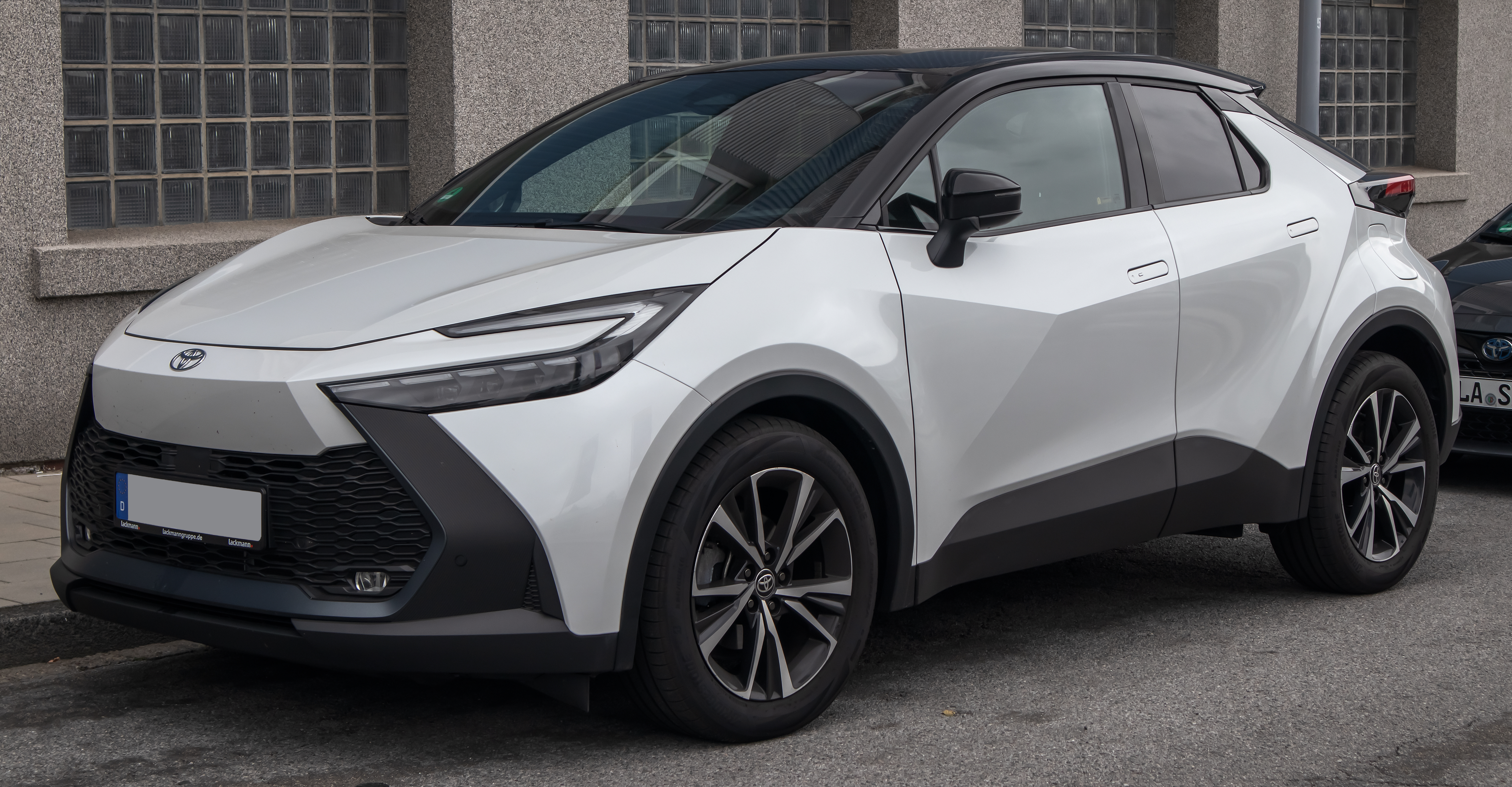
- 2024 Toyota C-HR 2.0 Hybrid (MAXH25, Europe)

Overview
- Model code: AX20
- Production: October 2023 – present
- Assembly: Turkey: Sakarya (TMMT)
- Designer: Elvio D'Aprile, Ken Nagasaka

Body and chassis
- Platform: TNGA: GA-C
- Related: Toyota Prius (XW60); Toyota Prius PHV/Prime (XW60)

Powertrain
- Engine: Petrol hybrid: 1798 cc 2ZR-FXE I4 (ZYX20); 1986 cc M20A-FXS I4 (MAXH20/MAXH25); Petrol plug-in hybrid: 1986 cc M20A-FXS I4 (MAXH21)
- Transmission: eCVT
- Hybrid drivetrain: Power-split hybrid; Plug-in hybrid
- Battery: 4.08 Ah lithium-ion

Dimensions
- Wheelbase: 2,640 mm (103.9 in)
- Length: 4,360 mm (171.7 in)
- Width: 1,830 mm (72.0 in)
- Height: 1,538–1,564 mm (60.6–61.6 in)
- Curb weight: 1,430–1,650 kg (3,153–3,638 lb)

The second generation was previewed by a concept called the ‘Toyota C-HR Prologue’ on 6 December 2022.

The second iteration of the C-HR was revealed on 26 June 2023, and officially launched in October 2023. It receives two-tone paint, with a sharper, sleeker body compared to the previous model. The C-HR now features the new design language of Toyota, with C-shaped headlights that can be found on the Prius XW60 and the Aygo X Concept. Based on the previous model, it features similar features from it such as its hatchback body style, its platform, and similar models. Now exclusively on a hybrid drivetrain, it introduces a plug-in hybrid option for the first time, though the PHEV will not be sold in Australia.

With the same wheelbase as the previous model, the base models receive a 8.0-inch console display with higher end models including a dual 12.3-inch infotainment screen. The C-HR receives an upgrade in technology compared to the previous model, including a digital key, advanced safety systems, a remote parking option, and a hands-free driving system in traffic jams.

The range consisted of the Hybrid 140, Hybrid 200, Hybrid 200 AWD-i, and the Plug-In Hybrid 220. The AWD versions have a compact electric motor on the rear axle which provides more power and torque for better traction and stability. Frequency Sensitive Control (FSC) is used to enhance handling and comfort. This hydro-mechanical system increases damping force at low frequencies to deliver superior body control, in roll and pitch, as well as maintaining better control during cornering. Reduced damping at high frequency further improves ride comfort. This feature is installed in the C-HR Plug-In Hybrid and GR Sport Premiere Edition.

The C-HR GR Sport features 20-inch wheels with a all-wheel drive (AWD) system using the brand's E-four 4WD system. It has 2 electric motors with a power output of 145 kW (194 hp).

The new C-HR is no longer built in Japan; instead it is built exclusively in Turkey, at Toyota's Turkish plant. This generation is not sold in North America, Japan, China and Southeast Asia. In those markets, the C-HR has been replaced with the Corolla Cross, which is a C-segment vehicle and is about 100 mm (3.9 in) longer.

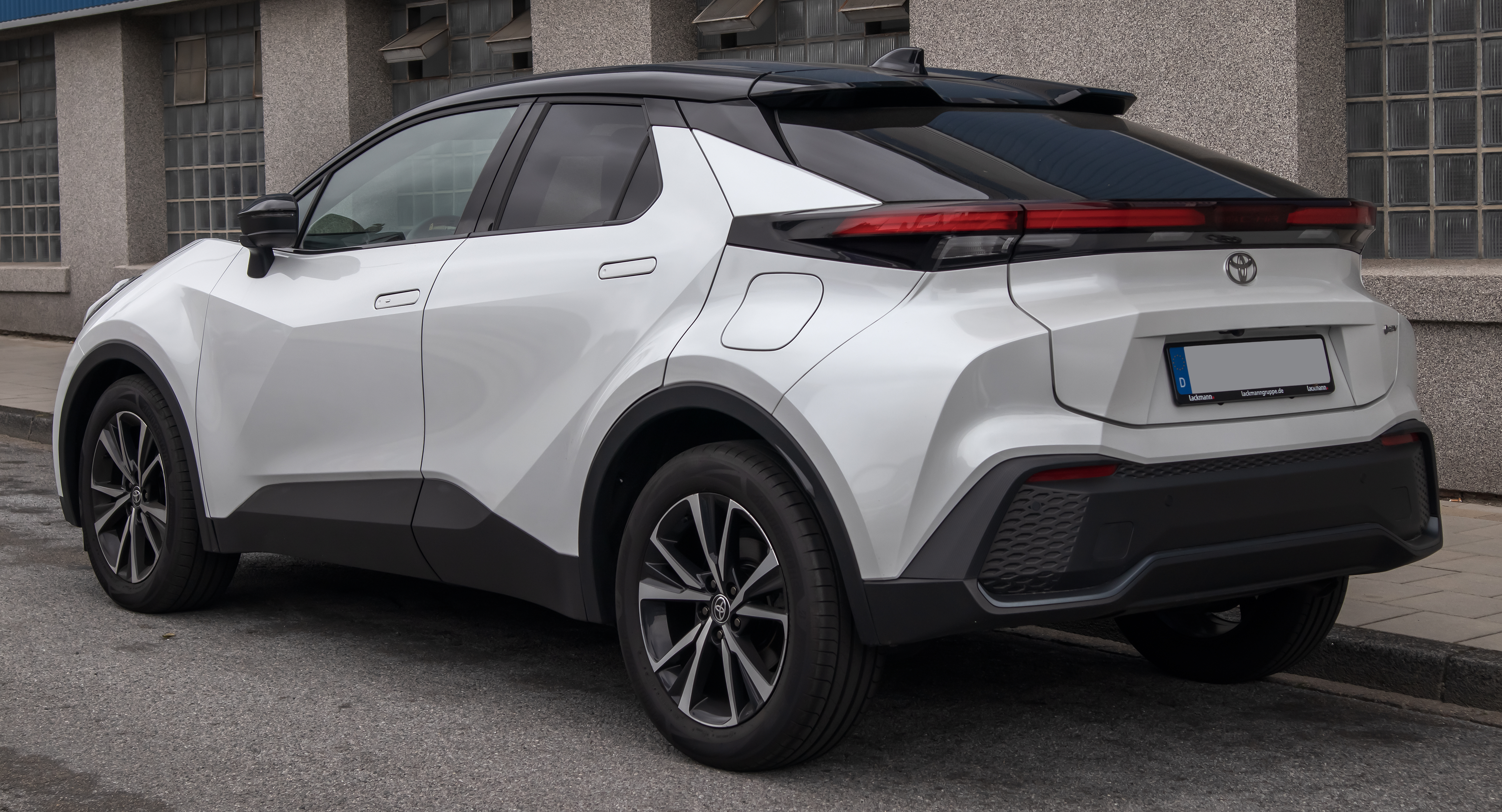
2024 Toyota C-HR 2.0 Hybrid (MAXH25, Europe)

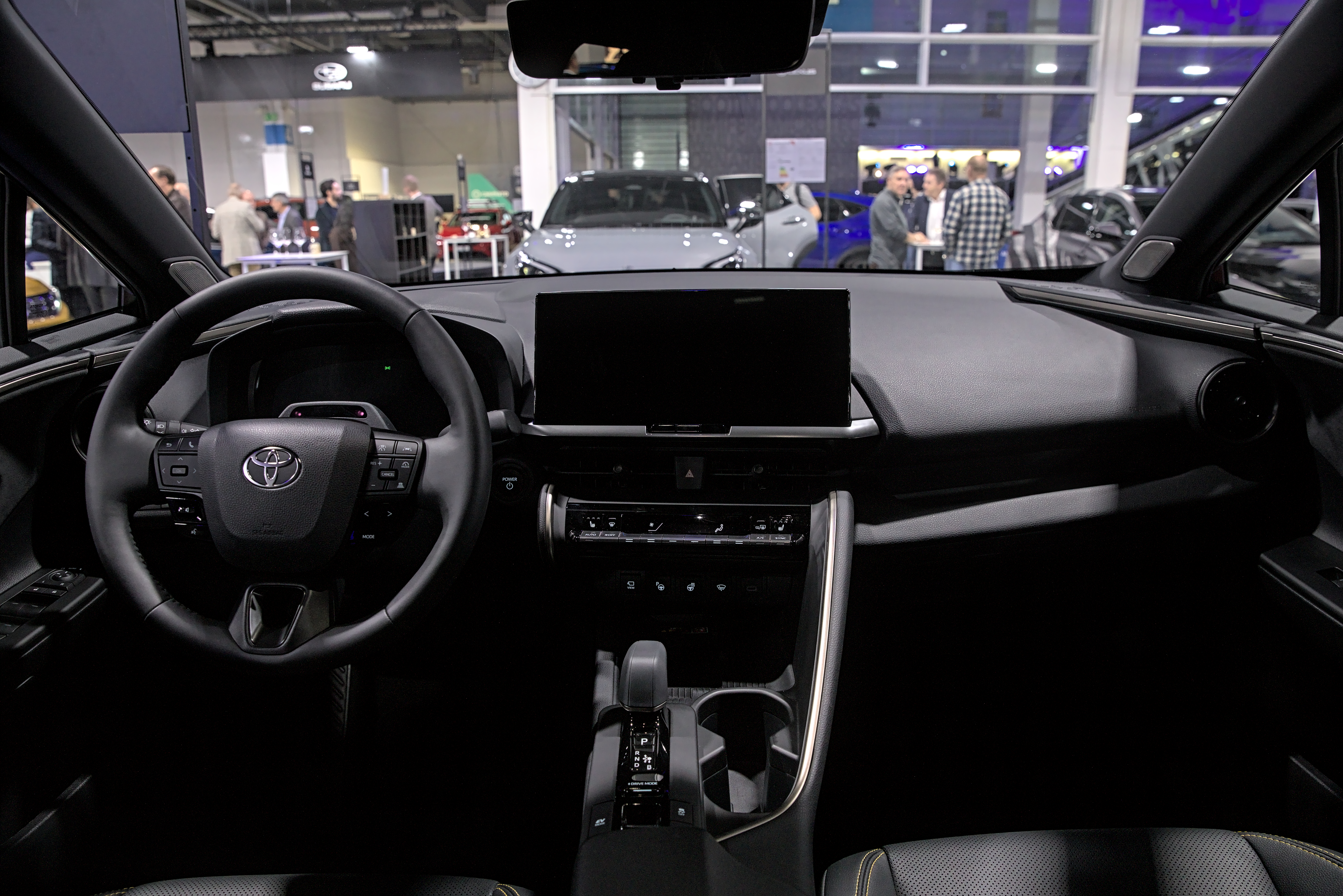
Interior of C-HR Hybrid (Europe)

=== GR-Sport ===
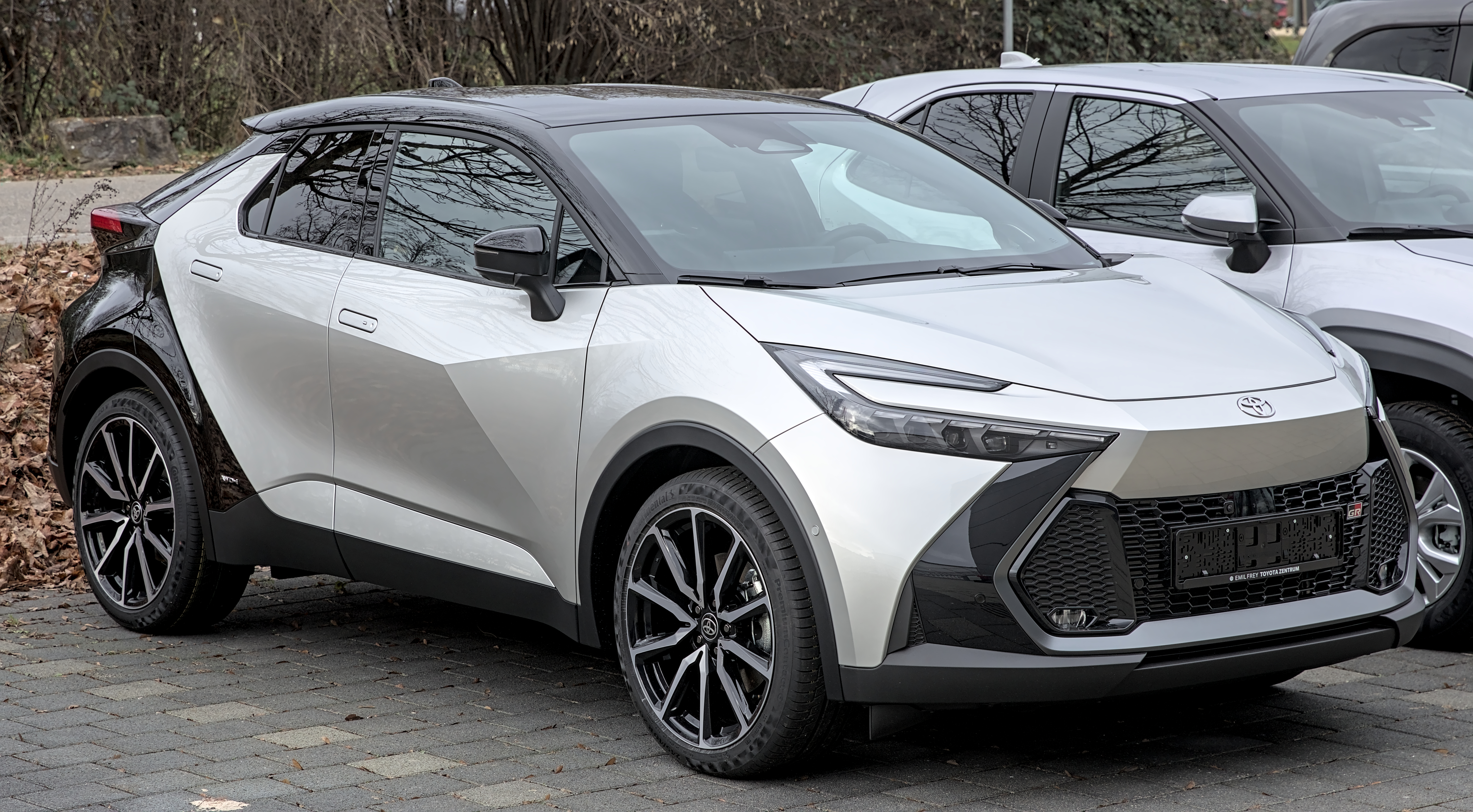
2024 Toyota C-HR 2.0 Hybrid GR Sport (MAXH25, Europe)

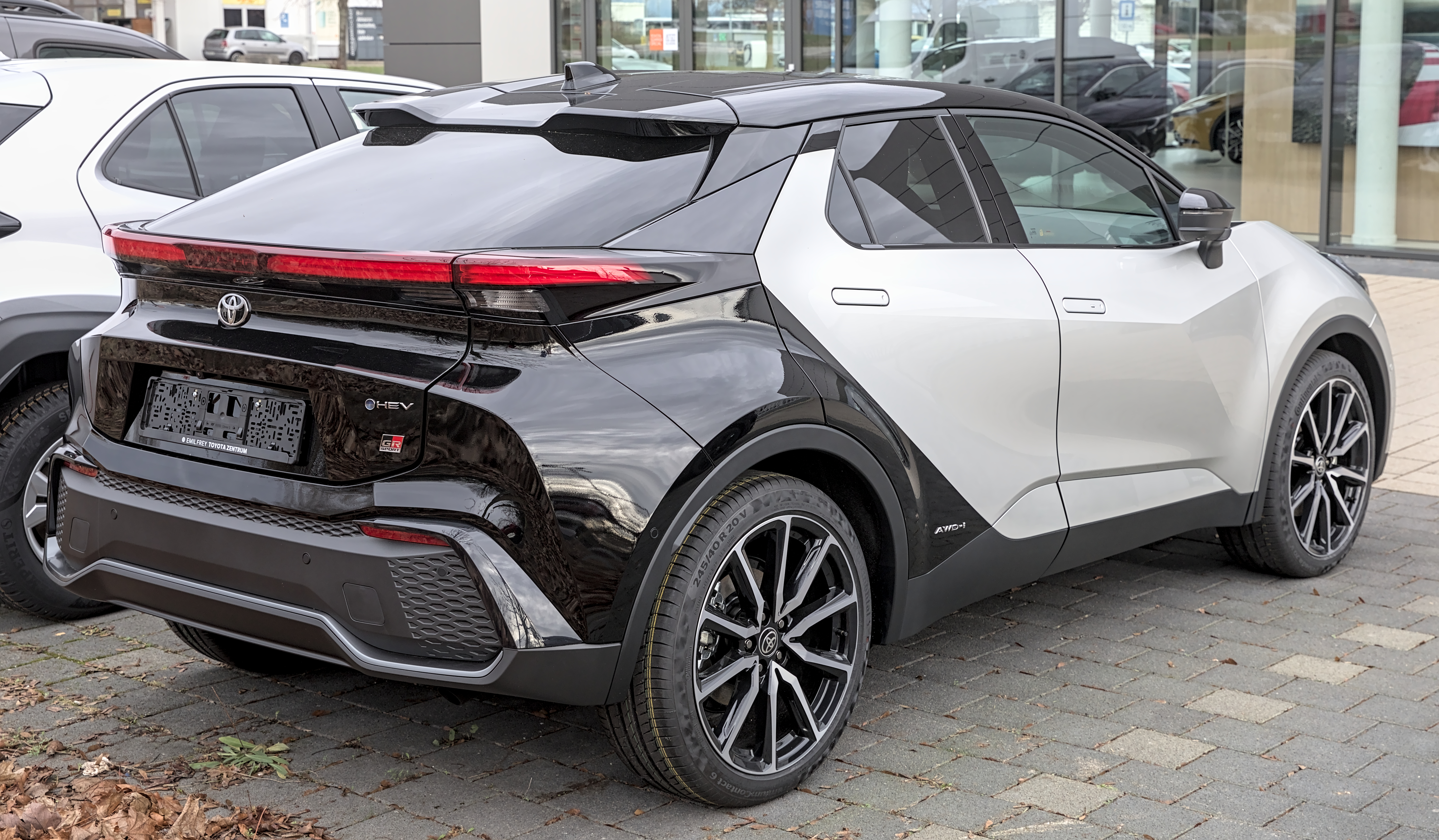
Toyota C-HR 2.0 Hybrid GR Sport (MAXH25, Europe)

=== Markets ===
==== Australia and New Zealand ====
The second-generation C-HR went on sale in H1 2023, exclusively in hybrid, excluding the PHEV. Trim levels are 1.8 GXL, 1.8 Koba and 2.0 GR Sport. Toyota Safety Sense (TSS) is standard on all models. Panoramic roof is optional for the Koba and GR Sport. Unlike the European GR Sport which wears 20-inch alloy wheels, the Australian GR Sport has 19-inch alloys although they are different from the Koba's.

For the New Zealand market, the C-HR is offered in GX, GXL, Limited, and GR Sport trim levels. The base GX rides on the 17-inch alloy wheels and tyres, the GXL has 18-inch, the Limited and GR Sport employ the 19-inch. Power tailgate and heated seats are standard on the GXL and the higher-grade models. Head-Up Display, heated steering wheel, JBL audio system, leather seats, and panoramic roof are only for the luxury Limited model.

==== Europe ====
The C-HR is expected within 2024 with all variants including 1.8 litre and 2.0 litre hybrids and 2.0 litre plug-in hybrids. The model grade names are varied from one country to another, but basically comes in base, mid-level, luxury, and GR Sport. The base model comes with 17-inch alloy wheels, the next model grades wear 18 or 19-inch, and the 20-inch black machine-faced alloy wheels are reserved for the GR Sport. In the UK, the C-HR is offered in Icon, Design, Excel, limited Orange Edition, and GR Sport trim levels. The plug-in hybrid (PHEV) models are available for all grades, except the base Icon. Skyview Panoramic roof with thermal comfort glass is standard on the Excel and Orange Edition. Head Up Display is only for the Orange Edition and GR Sport.

For the German market, the C-HR was initially available as the base model Flow, Business Edition, Team Deutschland, luxury model Lounge, and GR Sport. In addition to these regular trim levels, there were also the more expensive fully loaded Lounge Premiere and GR Sport Premiere offered at the launch time. The only engine for the base model is 1.8 litre regular Hybrid. The higher-grade models can be ordered with either regular Hybrid or Plug-in Hybrid. The Team Deutschland is also powered by the 1.8 litre regular Hybrid, while the Lounge and GR Sport come with 2.0 litre regular Hybrid. Later, the base model Flow was renamed Active.

=== Powertrain ===
The powertrain of the second iteration C-HR hatchback consists of three models: a 1.8 L hybrid version using the 2ZR-FXE with a combined power output of 103 kW (138 hp; 140 PS) using the single motor and the engine, a 2.0 L hybrid version using the M20A-FXS engine, with a combined output of 145 kW (194 hp; 197 PS) using the engine and the motors, and a plug-in hybrid variant using the M20A-FXS engine, producing a combined output of 164 kW (220 hp; 223 PS) with the engine and motors.

All models use the eCVT transmission.

Engines
Spec Type	Engine code	Displacement	Power	Torque	Combined system output	Electric motor	Battery	Transmission	Top speed	0–100 km/h (0–62 mph)	Electric range	Layout	Cal. years
Petrol hybrid	2ZR-FXE	1,798 cc (1.8 L) I4	Engine: 72 kW (97 hp; 98 PS) at 5,200 Front motor: 70 kW (94 hp; 95 PS)	Engine: 142 N⋅m (14.5 kg⋅m; 105 lb⋅ft) at 3,600 Front motor: 185 N⋅m (18.9 kg⋅m; 136 lb⋅ft)	103 kW (138 hp; 140 PS)	-	4.08 Ah lithium-ion	eCVT	170 km/h (110 mph)	9.9 s	-	FWD	
Petrol hybrid	2ZR-FXE	1,798 cc (1.8 L) I4	Engine: 72 kW (97 hp; 98 PS) at 5,200 Front motor: 70 kW (94 hp; 95 PS)	Engine: 142 N⋅m (14.5 kg⋅m; 105 lb⋅ft) at 3,600 Front motor: 185 N⋅m (18.9 kg⋅m; 136 lb⋅ft)	103 kW (138 hp; 140 PS)	-	4.08 Ah lithium-ion	eCVT	170 km/h (110 mph)	9.9 s	-	FWD	2023—
Petrol hybrid	M20A-FXS	1,986 cc (2.0 L) I4	Engine: 112 kW (150 hp; 152 PS) at 6,000 Front motor: 83 kW (111 hp; 113 PS) Rear motor: 30 kW (40 hp; 41 PS)	190 N⋅m (19.4 kg⋅m; 140 lb⋅ft) at 4,400-5,200 Front motor: 206 N⋅m (21.0 kg⋅m; 152 lb⋅ft) Rear motor: 84 N⋅m (8.57 kg⋅m; 62.0 lb⋅ft)	145 kW (194 hp; 197 PS)	-	4.08 Ah lithium-ion	eCVT	180 km/h (110 mph)	8.1 s (FWD); 7.9 s (AWD)	-	FWD; AWD (AWD-i)	
Petrol hybrid	M20A-FXS	1,986 cc (2.0 L) I4	Engine: 112 kW (150 hp; 152 PS) at 6,000 Front motor: 83 kW (111 hp; 113 PS) Rear motor: 30 kW (40 hp; 41 PS)	190 N⋅m (19.4 kg⋅m; 140 lb⋅ft) at 4,400-5,200 Front motor: 206 N⋅m (21.0 kg⋅m; 152 lb⋅ft) Rear motor: 84 N⋅m (8.57 kg⋅m; 62.0 lb⋅ft)	145 kW (194 hp; 197 PS)	-	4.08 Ah lithium-ion	eCVT	180 km/h (110 mph)	8.1 s (FWD); 7.9 s (AWD)	-	FWD; AWD (AWD-i)	2023—
Petrol plug-in hybrid	M20A-FXS	1,986 cc (2.0 L) I4	Engine: 112 kW (150 hp; 152 PS) at 6,000 Front motor: 120 kW (161 hp; 163 PS)	Engine: 190 N⋅m (19.4 kg⋅m; 140 lb⋅ft) at 4,400-5,200 Front motor: 208 N⋅m (21.2 kg⋅m; 153 lb⋅ft)	164 kW (220 hp; 223 PS)	-	13,8 kWh lithium-ion	eCVT	180 km/h (110 mph)	7.4 s	66 km (41 mi)	FWD	
Petrol plug-in hybrid	M20A-FXS	1,986 cc (2.0 L) I4	Engine: 112 kW (150 hp; 152 PS) at 6,000 Front motor: 120 kW (161 hp; 163 PS)	Engine: 190 N⋅m (19.4 kg⋅m; 140 lb⋅ft) at 4,400-5,200 Front motor: 208 N⋅m (21.2 kg⋅m; 153 lb⋅ft)	164 kW (220 hp; 223 PS)	-	13,8 kWh lithium-ion	eCVT	180 km/h (110 mph)	7.4 s	66 km (41 mi)	FWD	2023—

=== Safety ===
Euro NCAP test results Toyota C-HR (2024)
Test	Points	%
Overall:	5 /5 stars	
Adult occupant:	34	85%
Child occupant:	42.6	86%
Pedestrian:	54.4	86%
Safety assist:	14.3	79%

ANCAP test results Toyota C-HR all variants exclude GR Sport (2024, aligned with Euro NCAP)
Test	Points	%
Overall:	5 /5 stars	
Adult occupant:	34.04	85%
Child occupant:	43.59	88%
Pedestrian:	54.36	86%
Safety assist:	14.83	82%

== C-HR+ (2025) ==
A battery electric model named the C-HR+ was unveiled in March 2025. Its design was previewed by the bZ Compact SUV concept car presented in 2022. It is expected to be released in Europe in late 2025 and in North America in 2026 simply as C-HR.

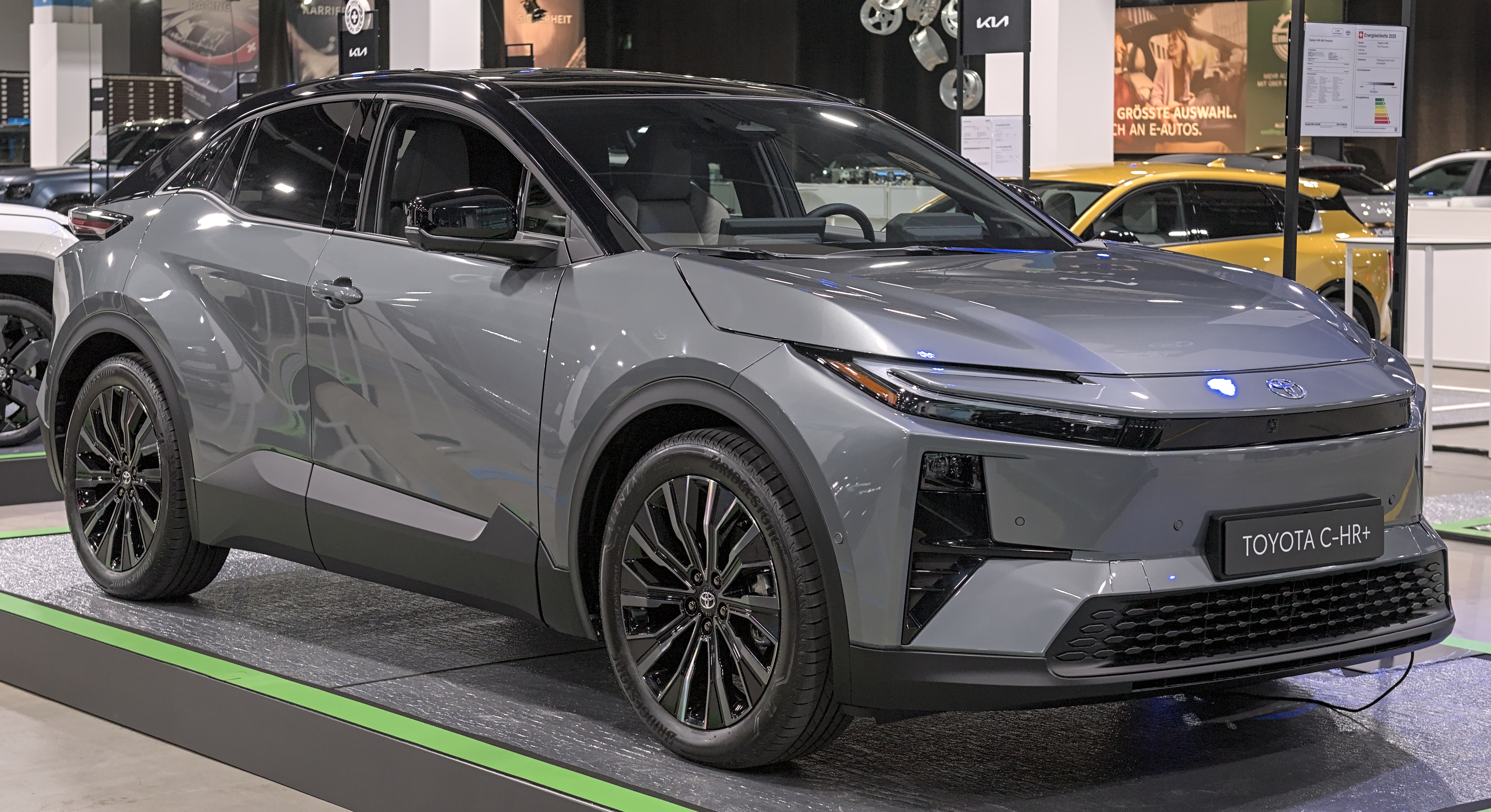
Toyota C-HR+ (Europe)

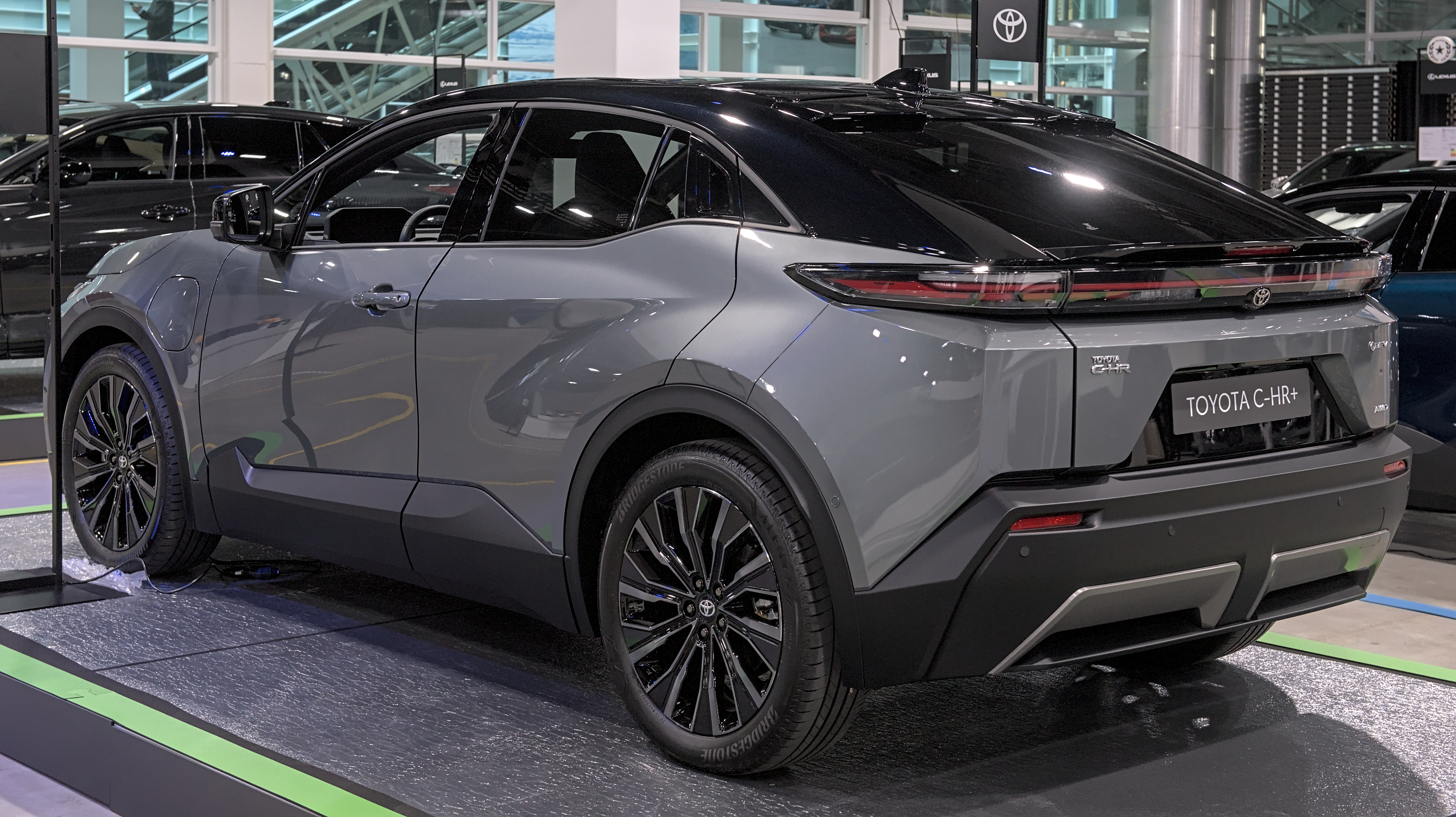
Toyota C-HR+ (Europe)

== Sales ==
Year	Europe	Turkey	U.S.	Mexico	Japan	Thailand	China		Australia	Malaysia (Note: Figures based on registration (Malaysia))
Year	Europe	Turkey	U.S.	Mexico	Japan	Thailand	C-HR	IZOA	Australia	Malaysia
2016	7,123	1,719			4,654					0
2017	108,170	6,278	25,755		117,299					1
2018	131,348	3,691	49,642	3,504	76,756	15,930	22,720	29,080		4,312
2019	119,786	2,866	48,930	2,629	55,677	13,318	59,461	52,989	9,378	2,122
2020	101,252	3,984	42,936	1,721	33,676	3,381	55,246	45,554	8,500	561
2021	106,251	2,281	35,707		18,096	1,729	46,433	44,803	6,578	71
2022	109,543	1,561	12,141		11,811	1,441			7,977	188
2023	117,552	2,775	777		9,810	590			4,786	137
2024	131,622								2,828	66
2025	143,166								2,892	

== See also ==
- List of Toyota vehicles
