= Canadian Society for Clinical Investigation =

Canadian Society for Clinical Investigation (CSCI) was founded in 1951. The original purpose was to provide people with a forum to exchange scientific information. CSCI's current Mission is "To promote clinical and basic research in the field of human health throughout Canada, to lobby for adequate research funding at the federal, regional and local levels, and to support Canadian researchers in their endeavours and at all stages of their careers."

CSCI's Executive and Council is currently made up of the following individuals:

- President: Dr. Brent Winston
- Secretary Treasurer: Dr. Bing Siang
- Editor of CIM: Dr. Jonathan Angel

All medical schools in Canada are represented on the Council:

- Memorial University
- Dalhousie University
- McGill University
- University of Ottawa
- University of Toronto
- University of Western Ontario
- University of Manitoba
- University of Saskatchewan
- University of Calgary
- University of British Columbia
- Université de Montreal
- McMaster University
- Queen's University
- Sherbrooke University
- Université Laval

The Canadian Society for Clinical Investigation funds many awards:

- The CSCI_CIHR Resident Research Awards
- The Joe Doupe Young Investigator Award
- The Dr. Mel Silverman CSCI Distinguished Service Award
- The Distinguished Scientist Lecture and Award
- The Henry Friesen Award and Lecture (CSCI/RCPSC)

CSCI's Annual Meeting is held every year in September. The meeting is held jointly with CSCI, CITAC and FCIHR.

CSCI also publishes an electronic journal "Clinical and Investigative Medicine".

Anyone interested or actively involved in clinical investigation in Canada may join the CSCI as a member.
